= Tarajornitsut =

Coordinates: 67°03′N 51°00′W

Location within Greenland

Tarajornitsut is an uninhabited tundra highland in the Qeqqata municipality in central-western Greenland, within the bounds of Kangaamiut dike swarm. The highland has many lakes, shallow valleys, hills, and wetlands, with plentiful wildlife, such as arctic geese. It is also a major calving ground for reindeer. In the future the area will become a protected nature reserve. The Polar Route from Sisimiut to Kangerlussuaq ends in Tarajornitsut, on the shore of Kangerlussuaq Fjord.

== Geography ==
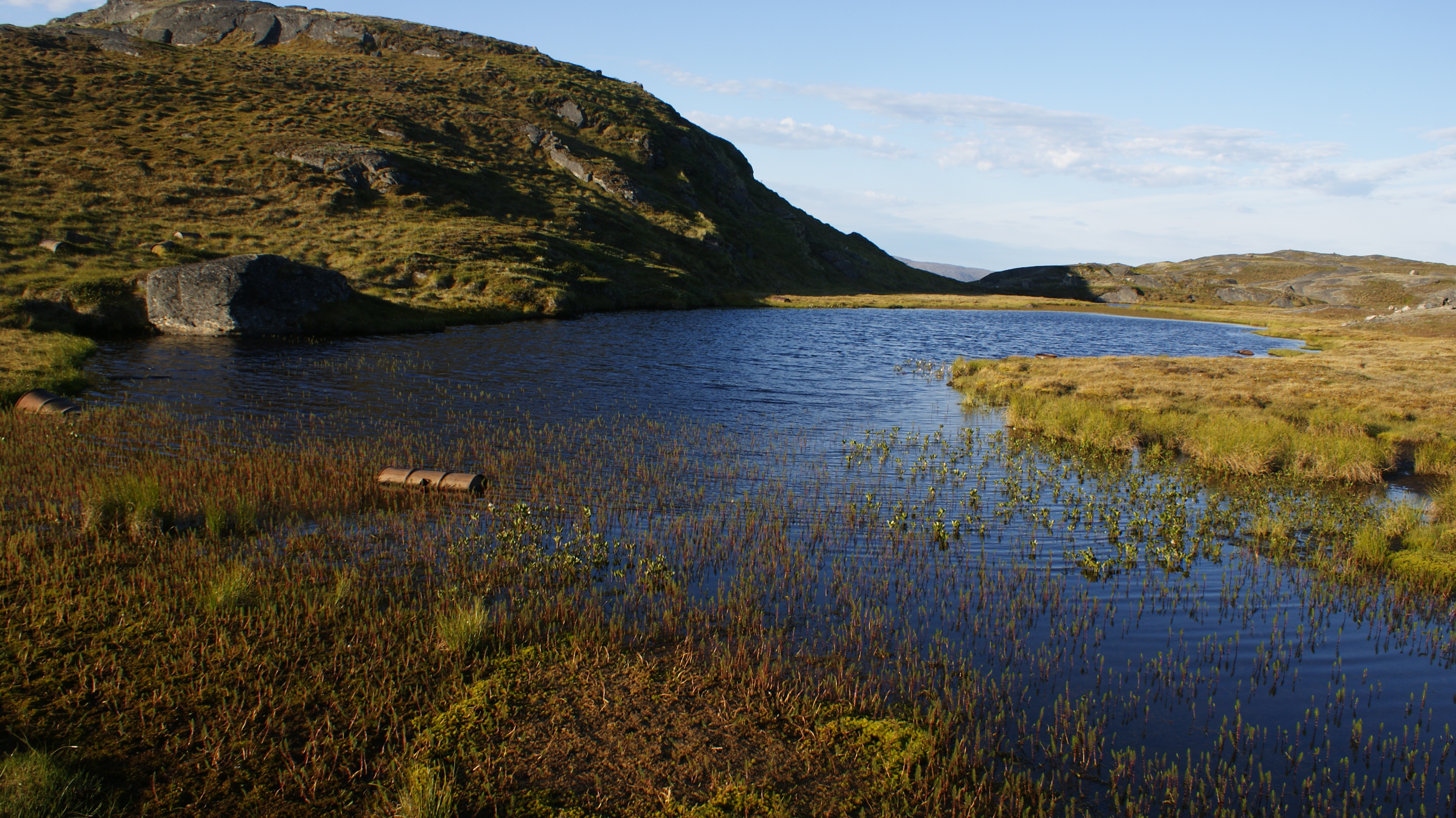
Tarajornitsut wetland lake under the highest point of the highland.

Tarajornitsut is located north of Kangerlussuaq Fjord, behind the dike scarp bounding the fjord from the northwest. The eastern part of the wide highland region of numerous lakes (some of which are saline), wet valley depressions, and mostly barren hills, begins immediately to the north of Kangerlussuaq, and is bounded from the east by the large Sanningasoq lake.

The long Tasersuaq lake in the west separates the highland from the Pingu mountain group halfway between Davis Strait and the Greenland ice sheet (Greenlandic: Sermersuaq). The range flattens considerably to the northwest of Tarajornitsut, due to pressure exerted by the icesheet for long periods in the past.

The entire region is part of the tundra biome, with the depressions and lakes being an important site for migrating birds, such as geese. The northern and northeastern part of the region is an important calving ground for the reindeer. The wetlands in the heart of Tarajornitsut dominate the depressions. Protected by the hills on the eastern side, they are deprived of wind blowing from the icesheet. Still water in these depressions is an incubator for billions of mosquitoes during the summer season.

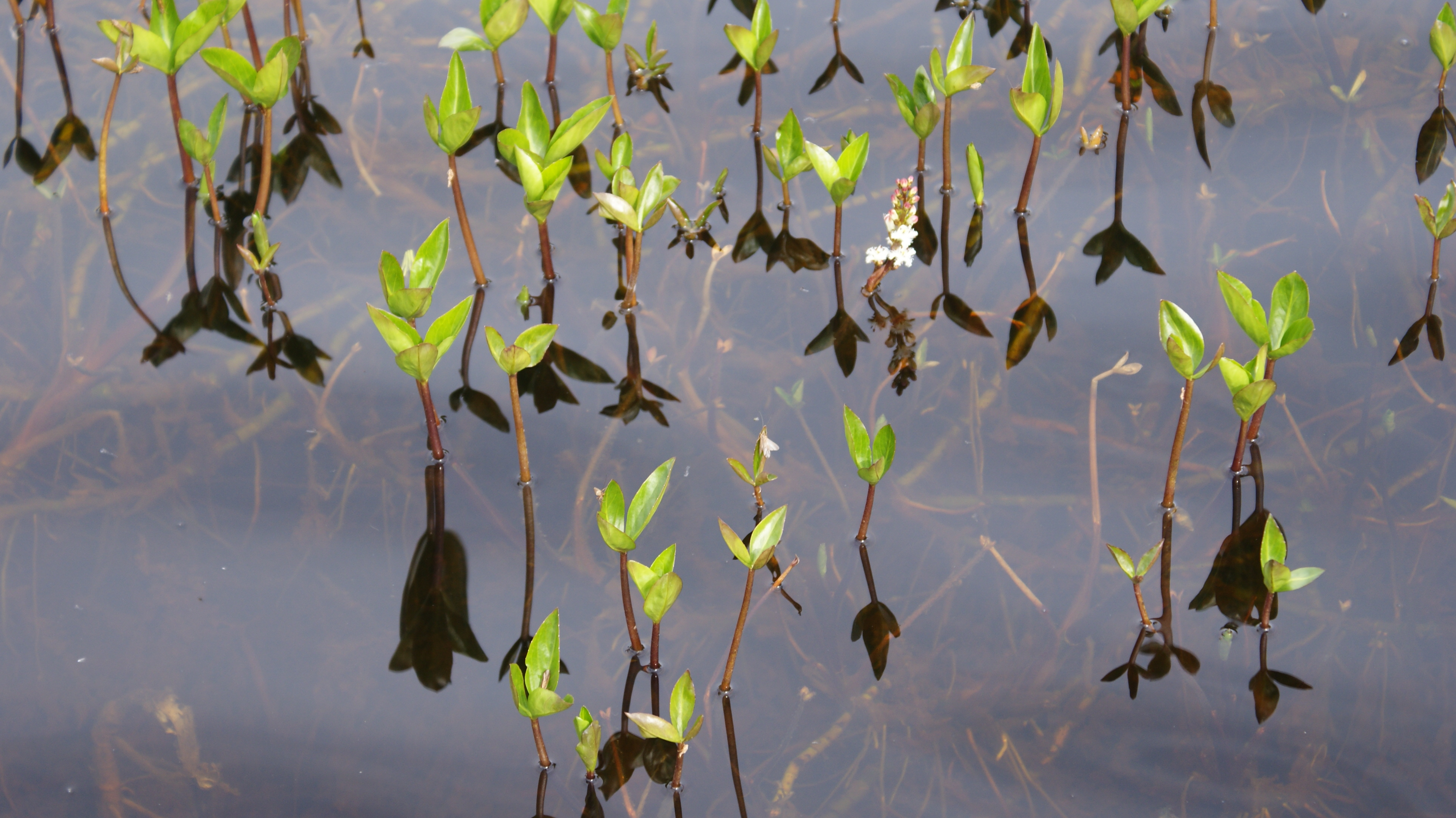
Some of the smaller tundra lakes present on the old maps of Greenland have disappeared, turning into marshy wetlands due to plant overgrowth.

The southern and southwestern edge of the region, north of Kangerlussuaq port, near the small Mount Evans hillock overlooking Kangerlussuaq Fjord is strewn with artifacts and trash dating from the era when the Sondrestrom Air Base was still operational. Numerous rusting barrels, wooden platforms, and small wetland bridges left by the American Army are common in the area.

The climate of the region is polar continental, and very stable due to considerable distance from the coast of Davis Strait, with the area receiving very little rainfall.

== Nature reserve ==
Kangerlussuaq is one of the settlements in Greenland exhibiting stable population growth patterns over the past two decades, with a dynamically growing tourism industry, primarily thanks to the airport.

Within the newly drafted development plan for the Kangerlussuaq area, the municipal authorities aim to establish a nature preserve in Tarajornitsut, with tourism channeled instead into the Akuliarusiarsuup Kuua valley with Russell Glacier, and into the Isunngua highland to the east, towards the icesheet.

== Polar Route ==
The tough, 160 km (99 mi) long Arctic Circle Race takes place each winter, with the trail partially overlapping with the Polar Route from Sisimiut to Kangerlussuaq. The race was inaugurated in 1998, since then becoming an international competition. The Polar Route passes through the western reaches of Tarajornitsut, ending in Umiarsualivik on the shores of Kangerlussuaq Fjord, approximately 10 km (6.2 mi) west-south-west of Kangerlussuaq.

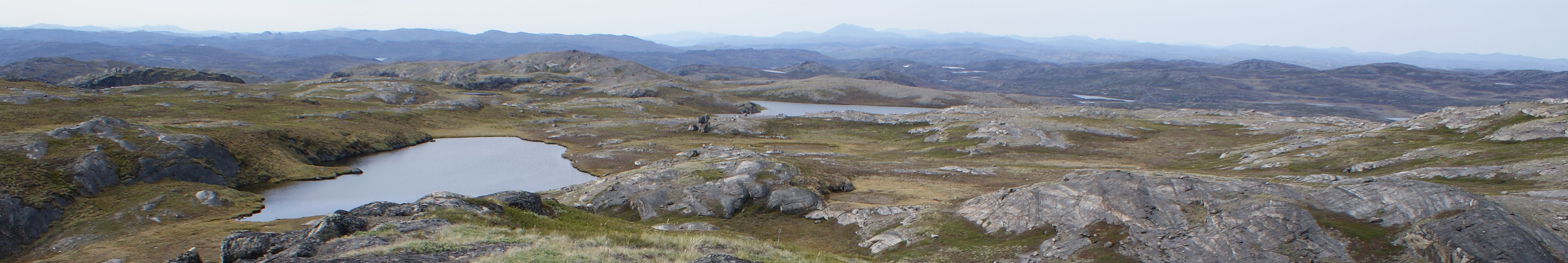
View from the highest point of the Tarajornitsut highland towards Pingu in the west.
