= Sanningasoq =

Lake in Qeqqata, Greenland

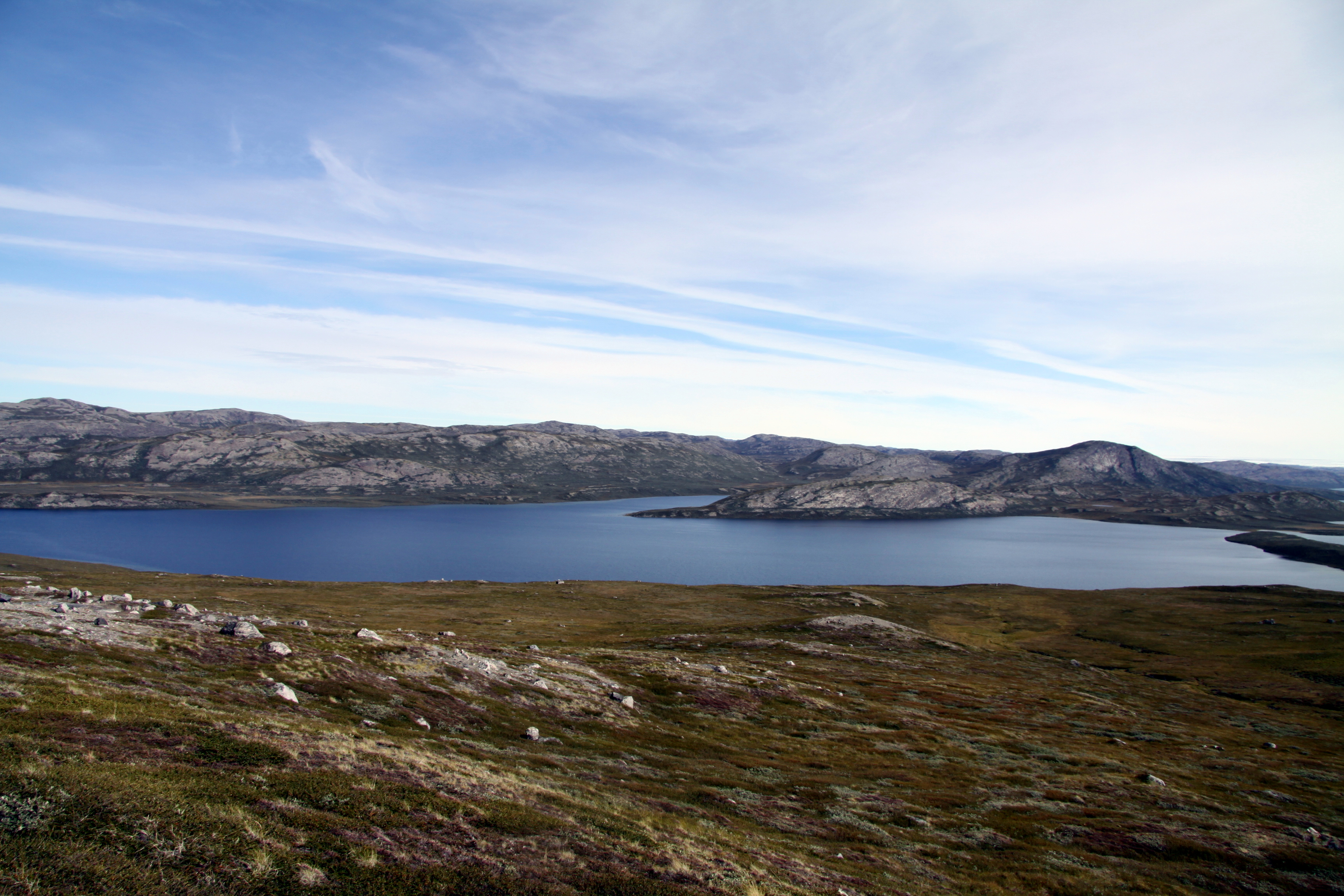
- Sanningasoq, with the characteristic broken isthmus

- Location within Greenland
- Location: Greenland
- Coordinates: 67°04′45″N 50°36′00″W
- Type: Oligotrophic
- Basin countries: Greenland
- Max. length: 10 km (6.2 mi)
- Max. width: 2 km (1.2 mi)

Sanningasoq (old spelling: Sáningassoq) is a large oligotrophic twin lake in central-western Greenland, in the Qeqqata municipality. It is located approximately 9 km (5.6 mi) northeast of Kangerlussuaq. It is characteristic in that it is composed of two lakes connected via a narrow water passage through a broken isthmus. Its northwestern shore is at 67°05′15″N 50°39′50″W and its southeastern shore at 67°04′00″N 50°28′53″W.

== Geography ==
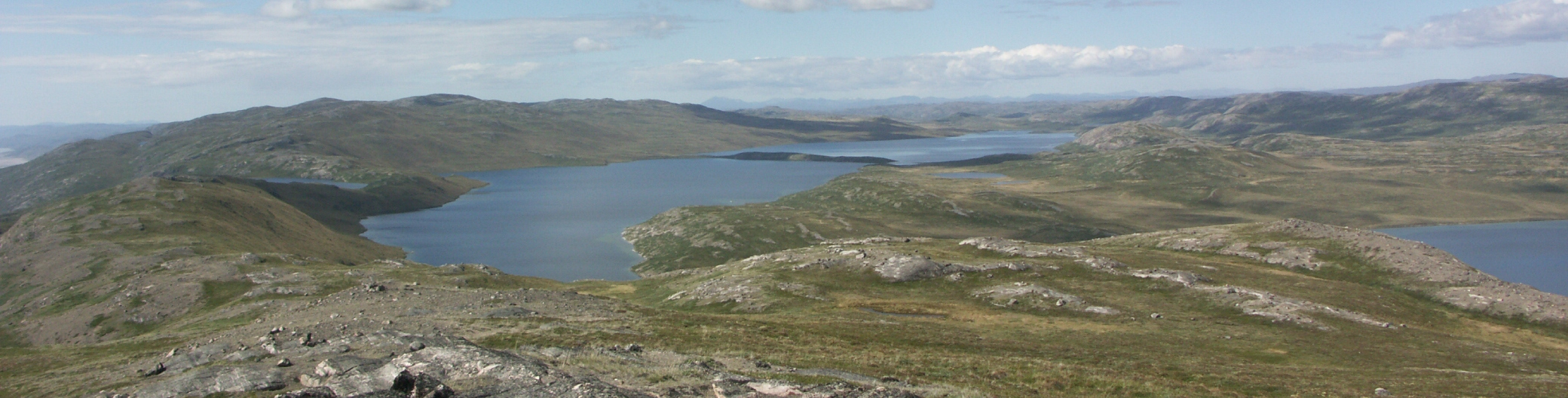
Sanningasoq

The 2x10 km twin lake is separated from the Akuliarusiarsuup Kuua valley and Kangerlussuaq in the south by a low tundra ridge − part of the Kangaamiut dike swarm. To the east lies a sibling Aajuitsup Tasia lake, separated from Sanningasoq by a low marshland isthmus of little relief. To the north-east lies the 549 m (1,801 ft) Maniitsoq hill in the wide highland of Isunngua. The wide Tarajornitsut tundra highland lies to the west of the lake.

The surface of Sanningasoq is almost level with the surface of the neighboring Aajuitsup Tasia, both being in the ancient outflow path of Russell Glacier, and by extension, Sermersuaq, the Greenland Ice Sheet. The local depression part of which is occupied by the lake continues for several dozen kilometers in the west-north-western direction towards Sarfannguit and Sisimiut.
