= Kangerlussuaq (disambiguation) =

Kangerlussuaq (English: "Big Fjord" from the Kalaallisut language) may refer to the following areas in Greenland:

== Fjords ==
- Kangerlussuaq Fjord, a long fjord in western Greenland
- Kangerlussuaq Icefjord, a fjord in Upernavik Archipelago in northwestern Greenland
- Kangerlussuaq Fjord (Kangeq Peninsula), a fjord in Upernavik Archipelago in northwestern Greenland
- Kangerlussuaq Fjord, East Greenland, a fjord in eastern Greenland
  - Kangerlussuaq Glacier, the largest glacier in eastern Greenland
- Inglefield Fjord, NW Greenland

== Settlement ==
- Kangerlussuaq, a settlement in western Greenland, with the Kangerlussuaq Airport.

== See also ==
- Sondrestrom (disambiguation)
- Søndre Strømfjord (disambiguation)
