= Tasersuaq =

Lake in the Qeqqata municipality in central-western Greenland

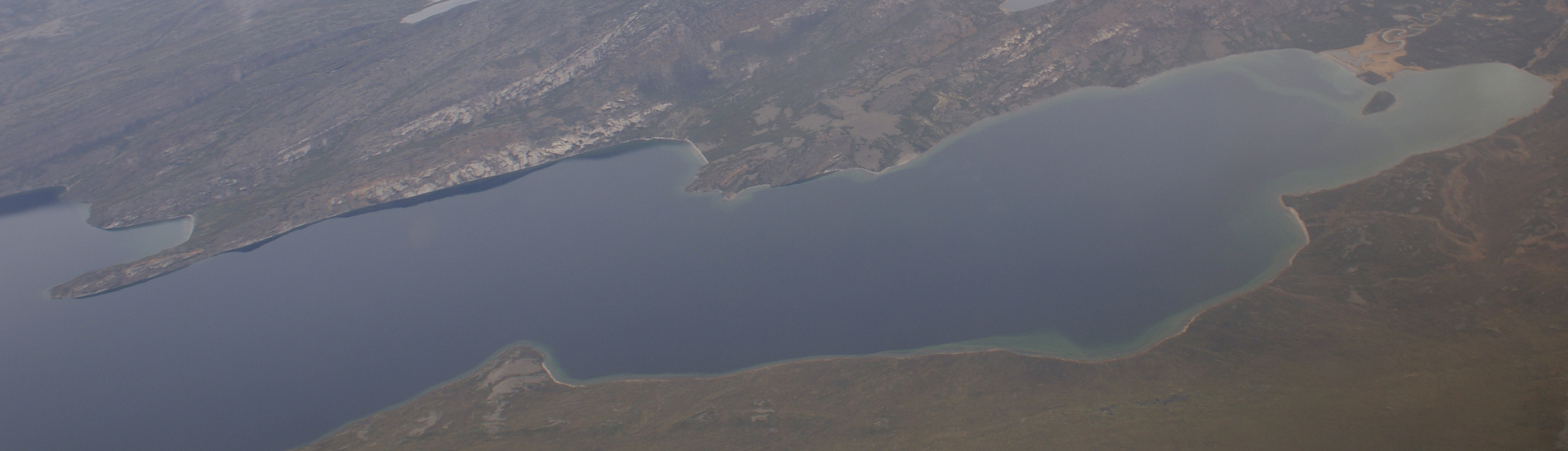
- Aerial view of the eastern end of the lake

- Location within Greenland
- Location: Greenland
- Coordinates: 67°00′04″N 51°50′00″W
- Basin countries: Greenland
- Max. length: 35 km (22 mi)
- Surface elevation: 10 m (33 ft)

Tasersuaq (/ˈteɪzjɪərsɔːx/ old spelling: Taserssuaq) is a large lake in the Qeqqata municipality in central-western Greenland. The name of the lake means large lake in the Greenlandic language, and is a common name shared by several lakes in the country.

== Geography ==
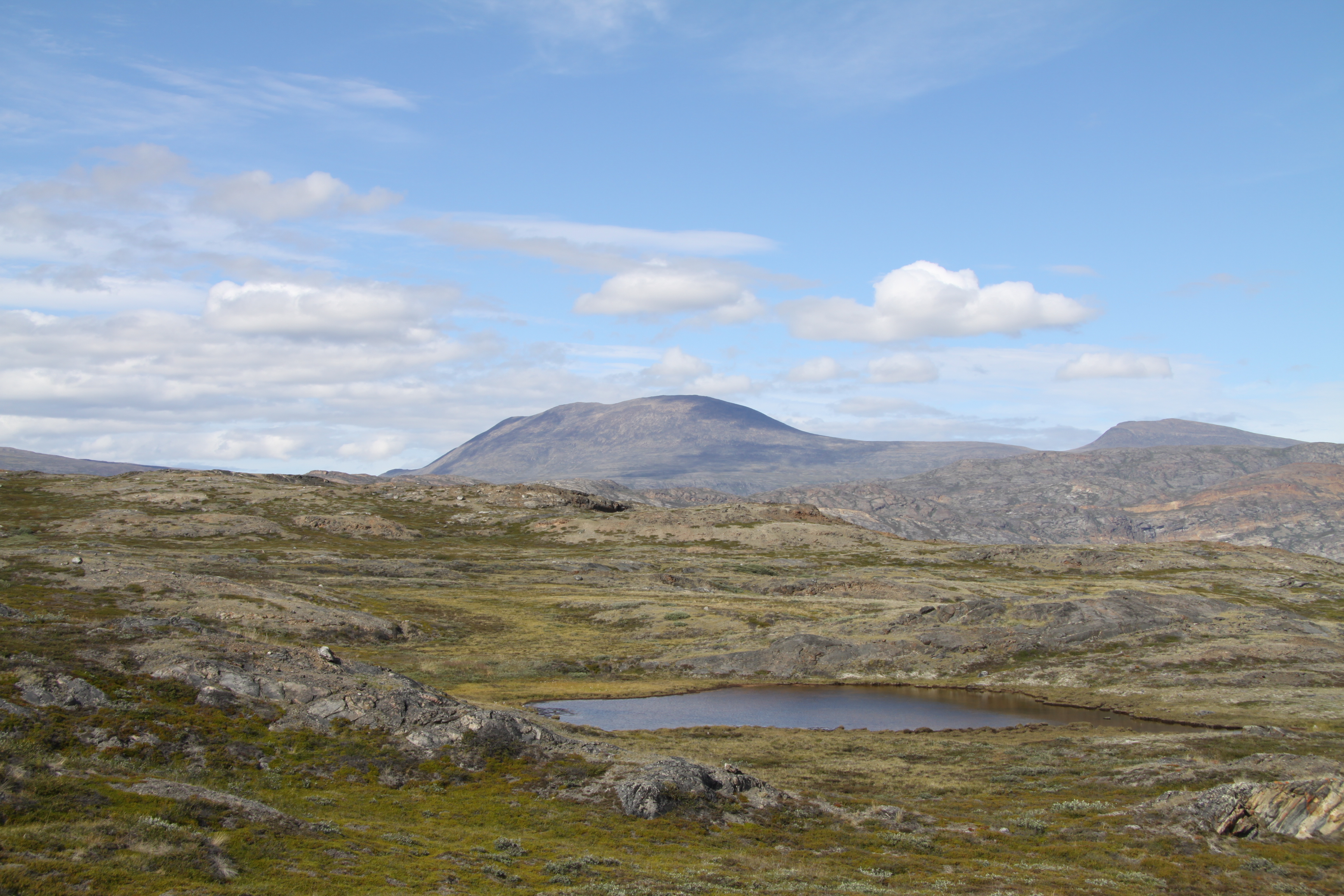
Pingu in summer

Location within Greenland

Tasersuaq is a latitudinal lake of elongated sausage shape, extending from approximately 66°59′50″N 52°15′00″W in the west to 67°00′15″N 51°27′45″W in the east, located halfway between Sisimiut in the west and Kangerlussuaq in the east, approximately 63 km (39 mi) east of the former, and 69 km (43 mi) west of the latter. In the northwest the lake is bounded by tall mountains of the Pingu mountain group. The range flattens considerably towards the east in the area of Kangaamiut dike swarm north of Kangerlussuaq, due to pressure exerted by the Greenland ice sheet (Greenlandic: Sermersuaq) for long periods in the past. The eastern end of the lake is located just west of the Tarajornitsut highland.

== Panorama ==
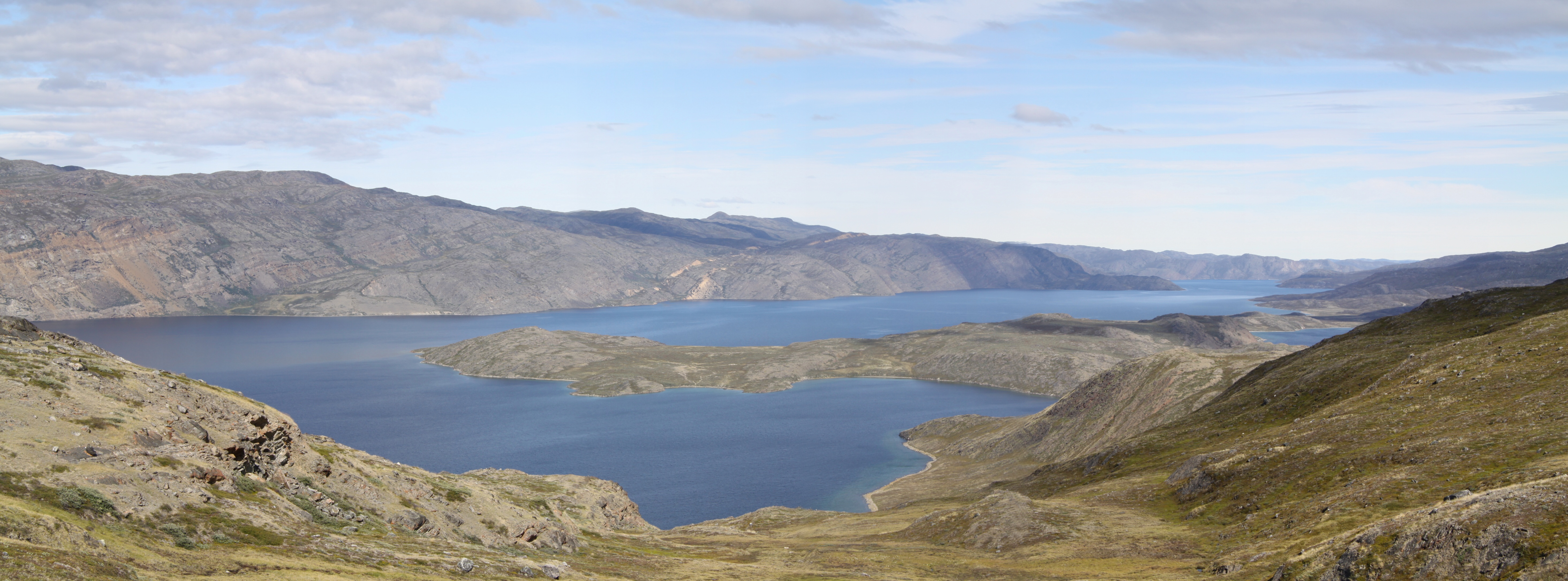
Panorama of Tasersuaq lake from 9 August 2010
