= Aajuitsup Tasia =

Lake on the western coast of Greenland

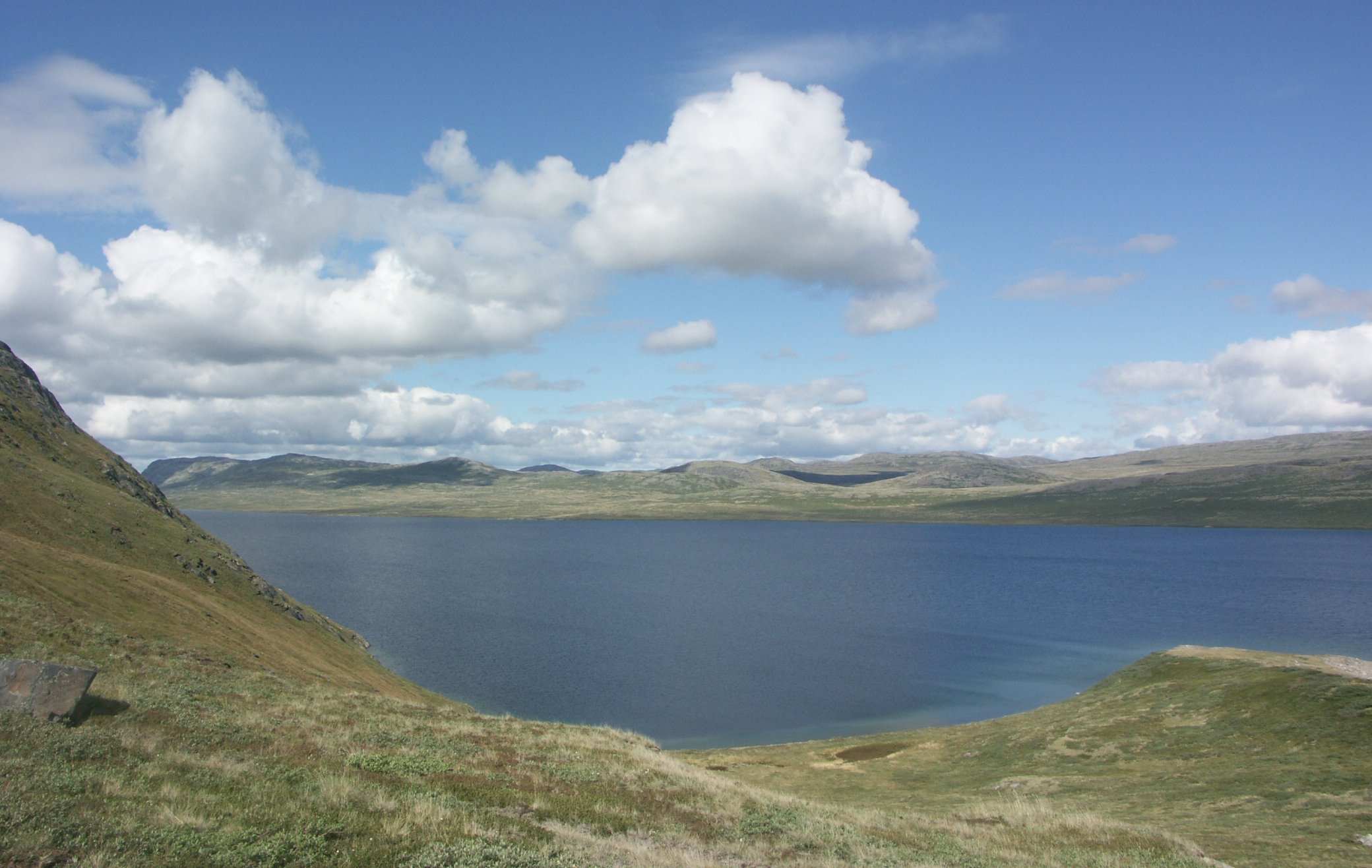
- Southern and northern shores of Aajuitsup Tasia

- Location within Greenland
- Location: Greenland
- Coordinates: 67°05′N 50°23′W
- Lake type: oligotroph
- Max. length: 10 km (6.2 mi)
- Max. width: 2 km (1.2 mi)
- Average depth: 32 m (105 ft)

Aajuitsup Tasia (old spelling: Aujuitsup Tasia; "long lake") is a large lake in central-western Greenland, in the Qeqqata municipality, just west of Russell Glacier. It is located approximately 12 km (7.5 mi) northeast of Kangerlussuaq. It is of elongated oval shape, with its western shore at 67°04′45″N 50°30′02″W and its eastern shore at 67°05′35″N 50°16′30″W. Aajuitsup Tasia is an oligotrophic lake of 32 m (105 ft) depth, covering an area of 1,350 hectares (3,300 acres).

== Geography ==
The 2 kilometres (1.2 mi) by 10 kilometres (6.2 mi) lake is separated from the Akuliarusiarsuup Kuua valley and Kangerlussuaq in the south by a low tundra ridge−a part of the Kangaamiut dike swarm. To the west lies a sibling Sanningasoq twin lake. To the north-east lies the wide highland of Isunngua. The area around the north of the lake has multiple traces of paleolakes and its shorelines, especially at the northern shore, and water exchange through spillways. The terraces around the lake suggests that the lake is subjected to gradual drainage, including a possible "catastrophic" recent drainage. Beside the lake is around 1 kilometre (0.62 mi) of an outwash plain before the Russell Glacier is located.

Its climate is characterized as having frigid winters with cool summers, and low annual precipitation, with most precipitation occurs during summer.

== Ecology ==
The area is characterized with Arctic shrubland, including shrub matrices and patches of tundra forbs and grasses usual among mountain non-carbonate substrate complexes, with common species include deciduous Salix, Betula, and Vaccinium uliginosum species, and evergreen Rhododendron groenlandicum and R. lapponicum. Flies of Heterotrissocladius and Psectrocladius species were identified at the lake.

== Gallery ==
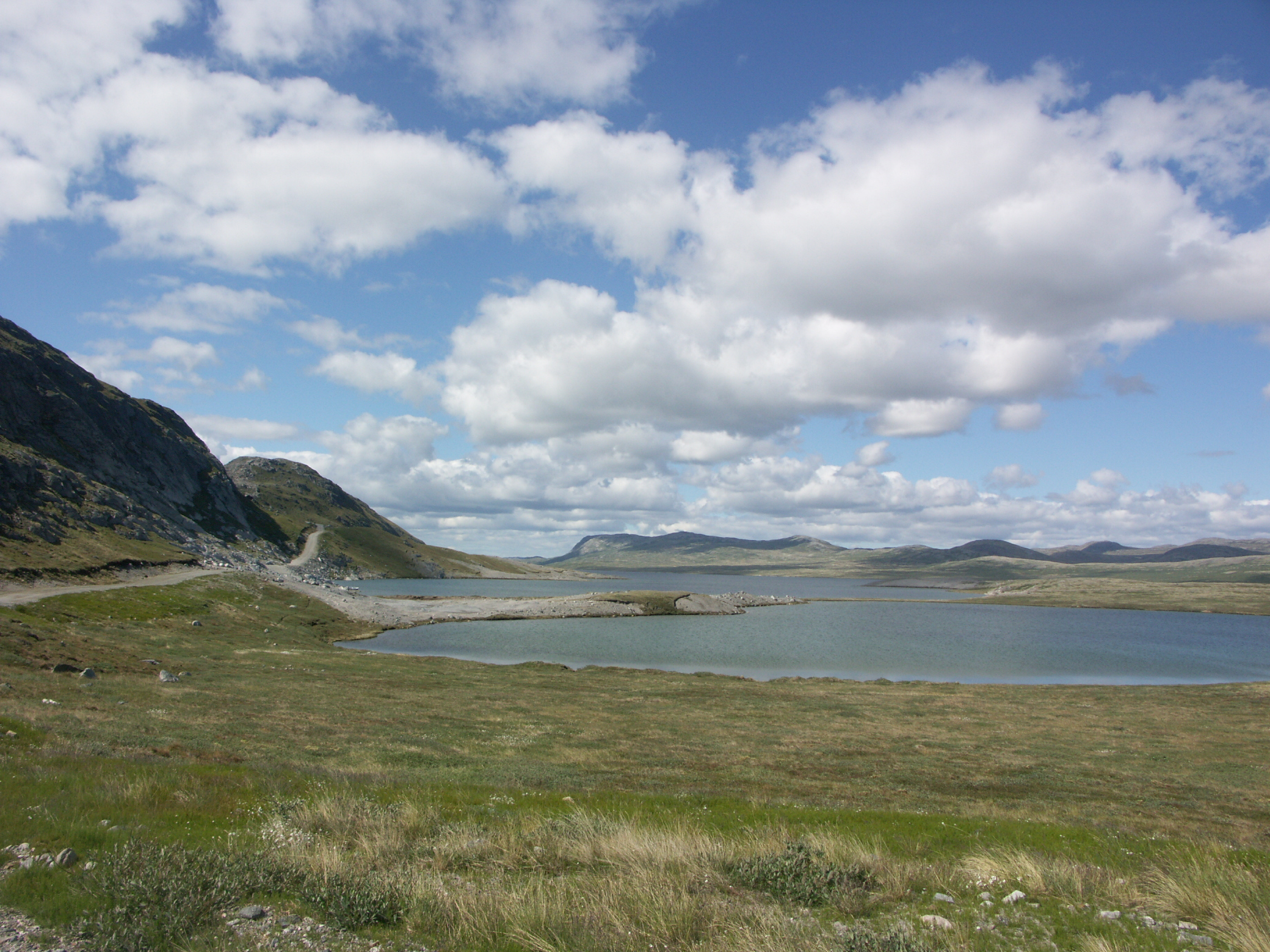
Eastern shore of Aajuitsup Tasia

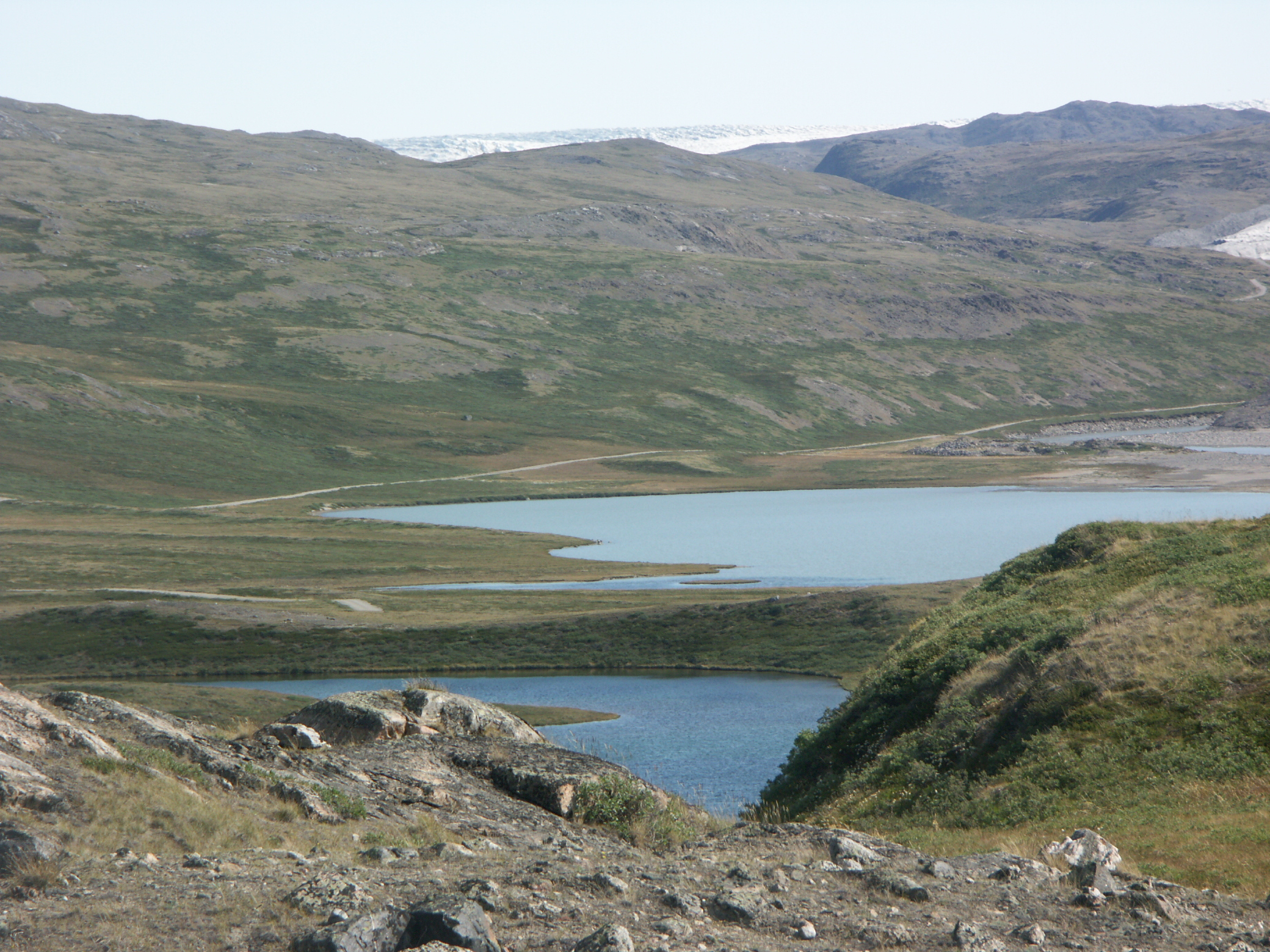
Color differential - fresh water of Aajuitsup Tasia, and meltwater of unnamed outflow lake of Russell Glacier

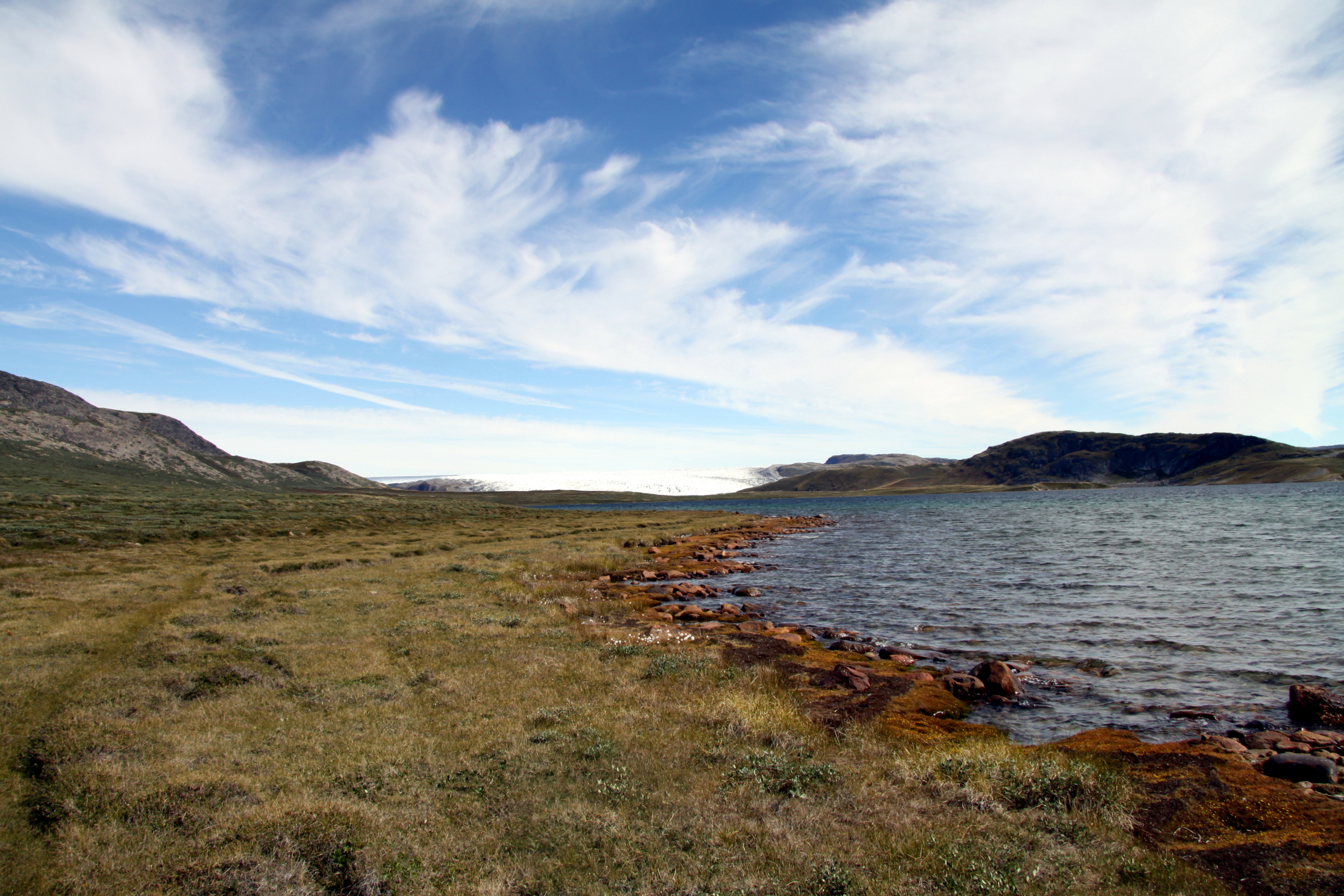
Lake Aajuitsup Tasia with Russell Glacier
