= Søndre Strømfjord =

Søndre Strømfjord is an old Danish name for:

- Kangerlussuaq, a settlement in western Greenland
- Kangerlussuaq Fjord, a fjord in western Greenland

== See also ==
- Kangerlussuaq (disambiguation)
- Sondrestrom (disambiguation)
