= Sondrestrom =

Sondrestrom may refer to:

- Sondrestrom Air Base, was a U.S. air base in central Greenland
- Sondrestrom (settlement), a settlement in western Greenland
- Sondrestrom Upper Atmospheric Research Facility, a research facility in western Greenland

== See also ==
- Kangerlussuaq (disambiguation)
- Søndre Strømfjord (disambiguation)
