= Isunngua =

Highland in Greenland

Coordinates: 67°08′40″N 50°10′00″W

Location within Greenland

Isunngua (old spelling: Isúngua) is a highland in the Qeqqata municipality in central-western Greenland, located immediately west of the Greenland Ice Sheet edge. In large part it is covered by the tundra, although in the immediate vicinity of the Sermersuaq ice sheet it gradually becomes exposed, barren, and largely devoid of life. The climate is polar continental, with the area receiving very little rainfall. Isunngua is a calving site for reindeer.

== Geography ==
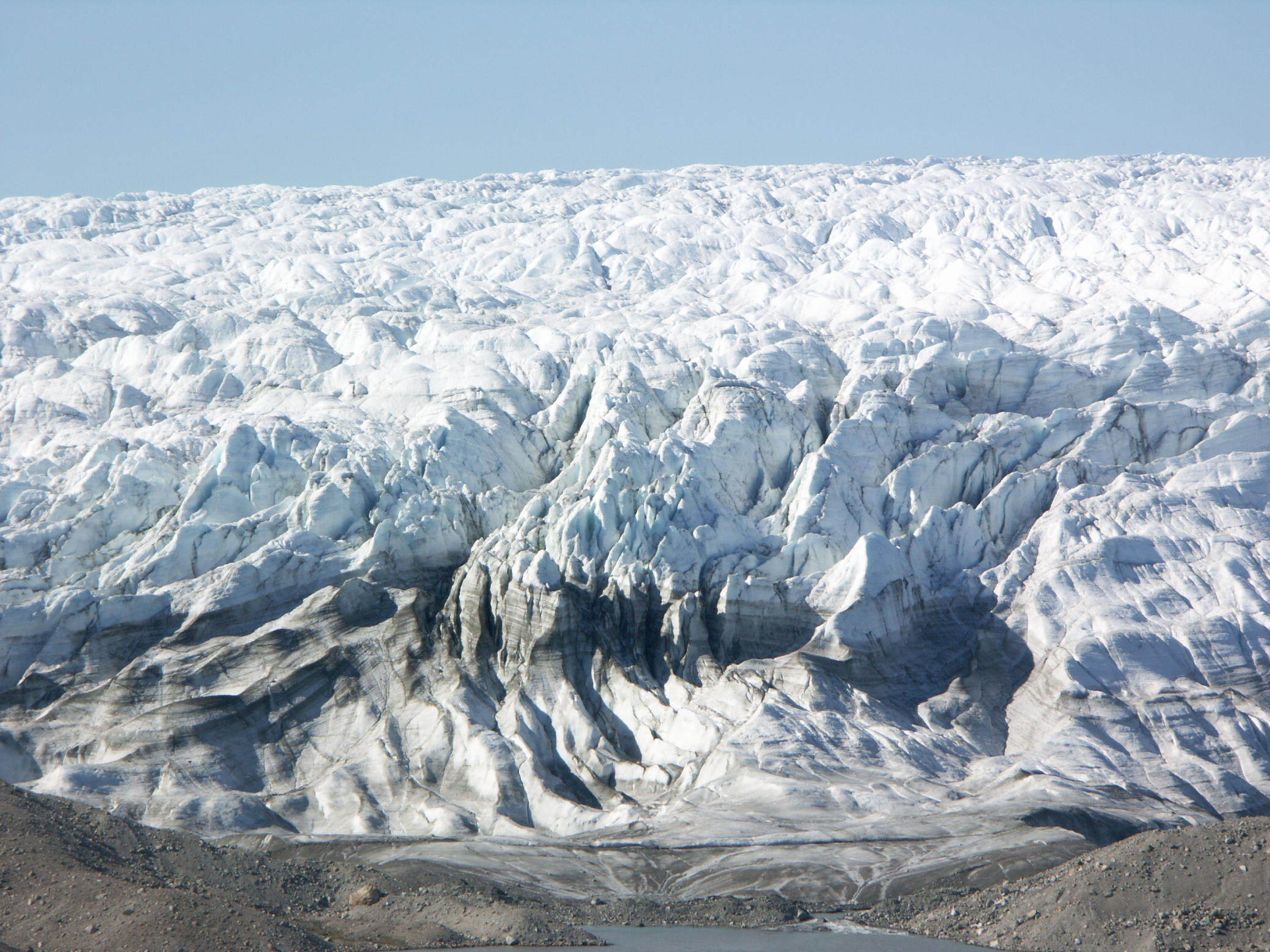
Isunnguata Sermia glacier forming the northern boundary of the Isunngua highlands

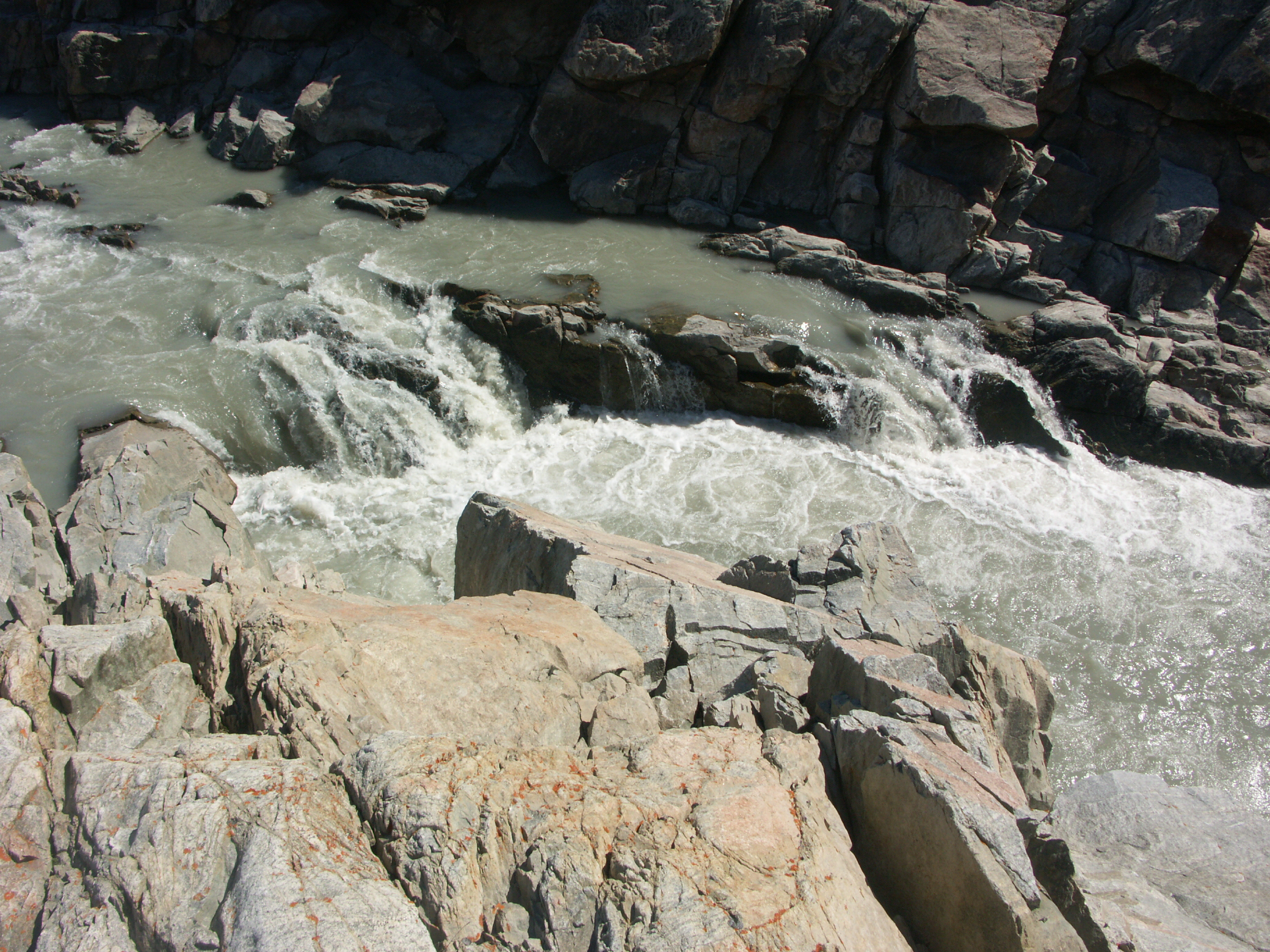
Meltwater canyon in Isunngua

Isunngua is notable for a gravel road which leads through it towards the edge of the Greenland Ice Sheet, located 40 km (25 mi) east of Kangerlussuaq, and due to trivial approach it remains a popular tourist target, although very few hikers make the journey on foot, or explore the neighboring glaciers.

The highland is bounded from the north by the Isunnguata Sermia glacier, from the south by Russell Glacier and Aajuitsup Tasia lake, and from the west by Sanningasoq twin lake.

Both glaciers flow to the west from the ice sheet, which constrains Isunngua from the east. The average height of the highland hills is approximately 500–530 metres (1,640–1,740 ft). The highland is dotted with freshwater lakes, kettles, and meltwater outflow lakes saturated with glacial silt.

== Road to the ice sheet ==
In the spring of 2000 the Swedish construction group Skanska's Greenlandic subsidiary completed six months' work in establishing a 30 kilometres (19 mi) road for the testing company Nausta, which operates a testing site in northern Sweden. The road runs through the glacial valley of Akuliarusiarsuup Kuua, from Kangerlussuaq to the edge of the permanent inland ice in Isunngua. A road stretching 150 km (93 mi) was laid on the inland ice. Nausta built the facility to complement the winter testing done by Volkswagen in northern Sweden and Finland.

The site at Kangerlussuaq was primarily used in the summer half of the year, from April through October. The entire testing ground was used to test cars' performance in extreme cold and conditions of near-zero friction. The cars were flown from Europe to Kangerlussuaq, and then driven to the proving grounds after last-minute checks. This project was abandoned and from 2006 the road leading to the edge of the ice cap is maintained for tourist purposes only, though access to the last segment of the road is limited and requires a key to open the padlocked gate. Ice activity has demolished the inland ice segment of the road, and it now ends in Isunngua, on the edge of the ice sheet.

== Photographs ==
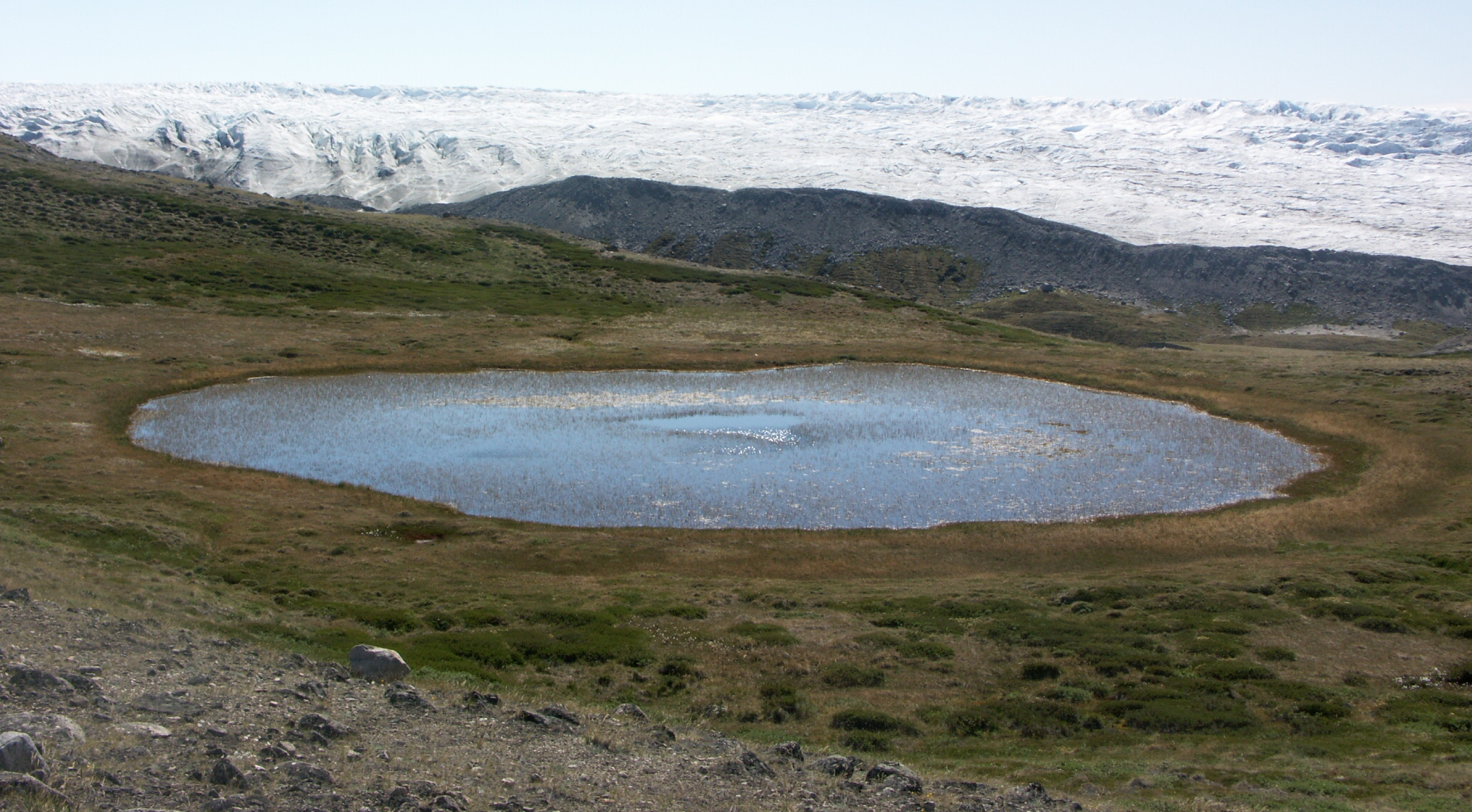
Kettle in Isunngua, a round, shallow glacial lake with no outflow

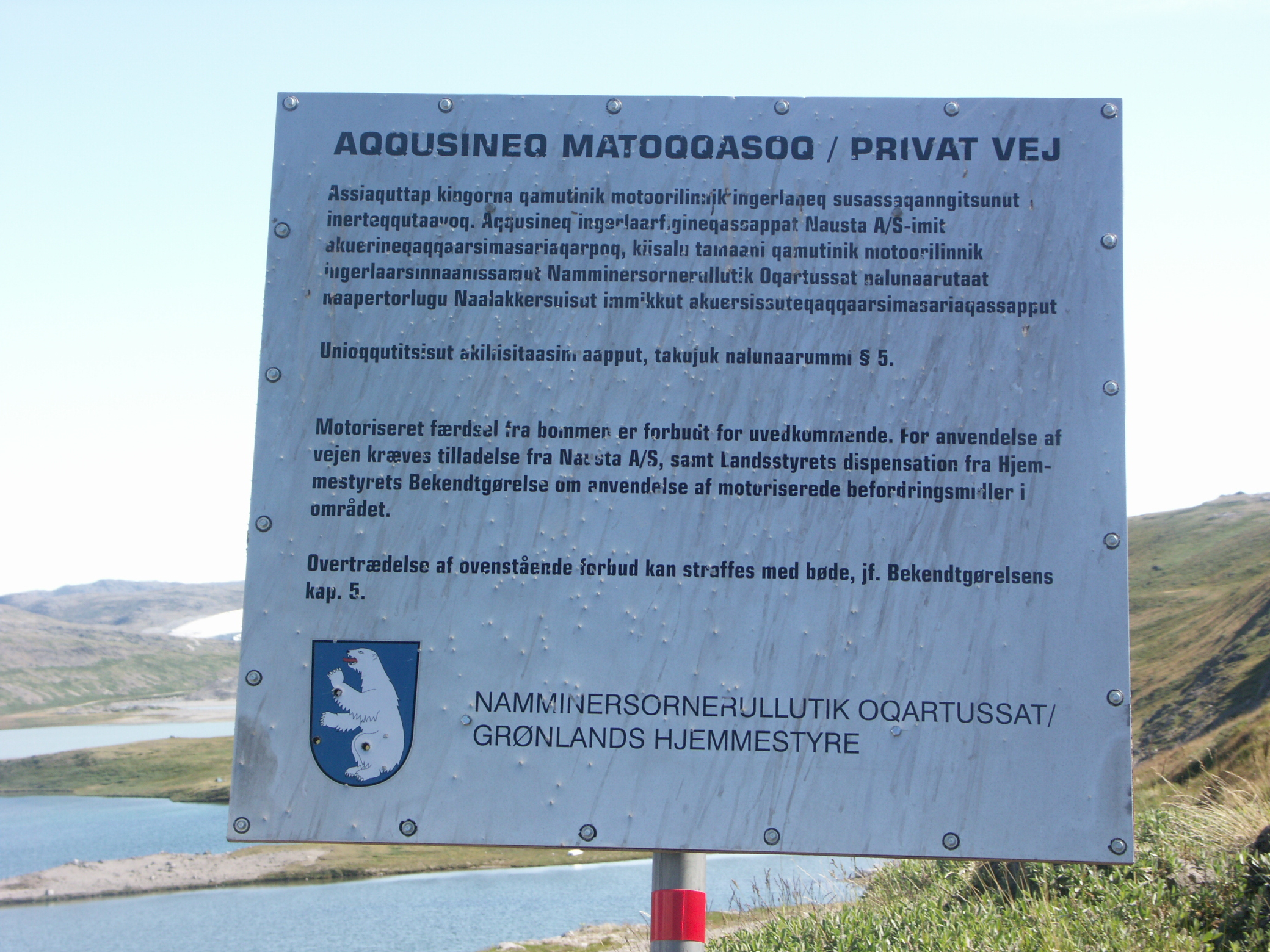
No entry for regular vehicles, a sign in Kalaallisut and Danish, Isunngua

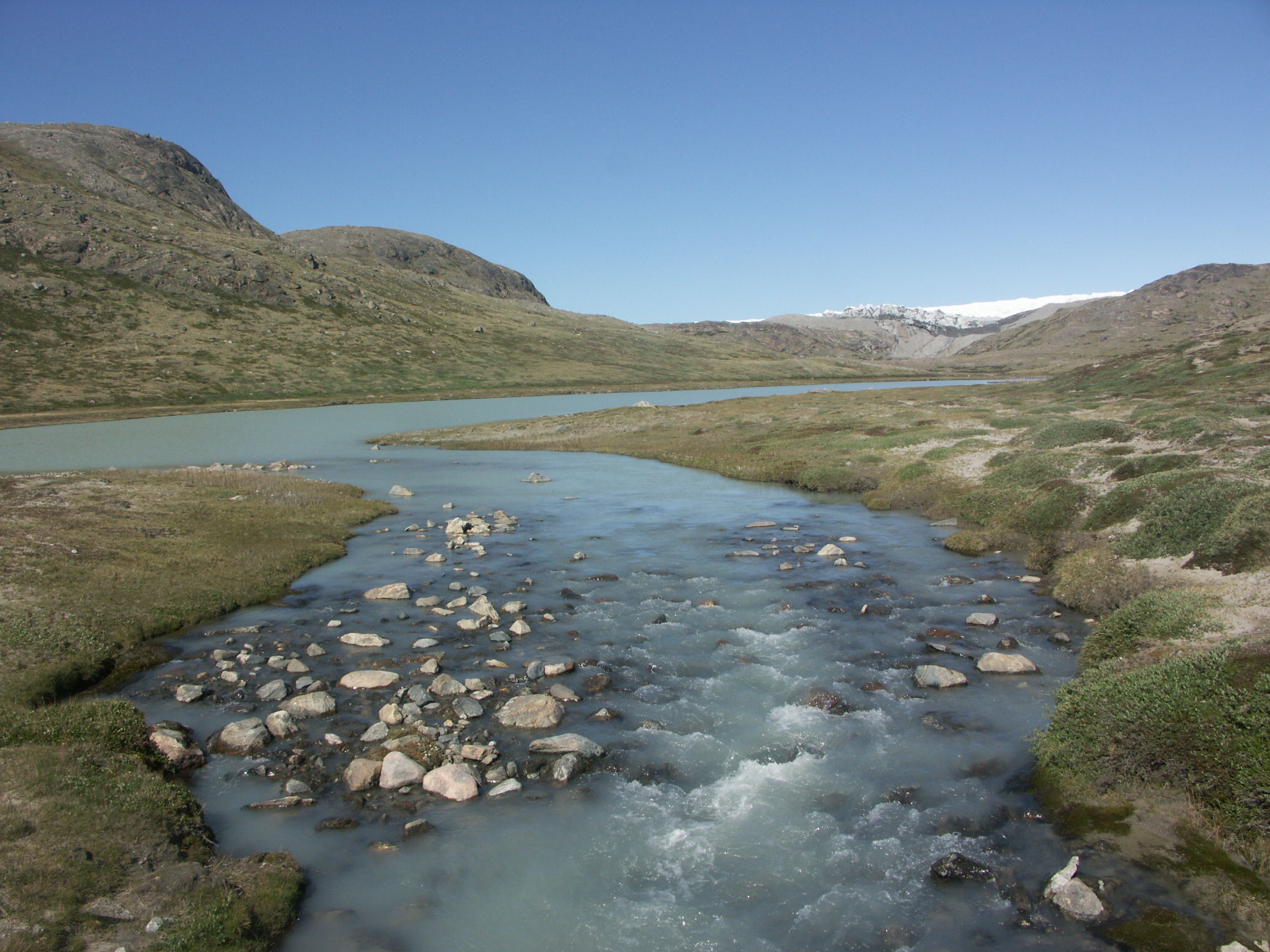
Highlands of Isunngua, an outflow of a meltwater lake with undrinkable water

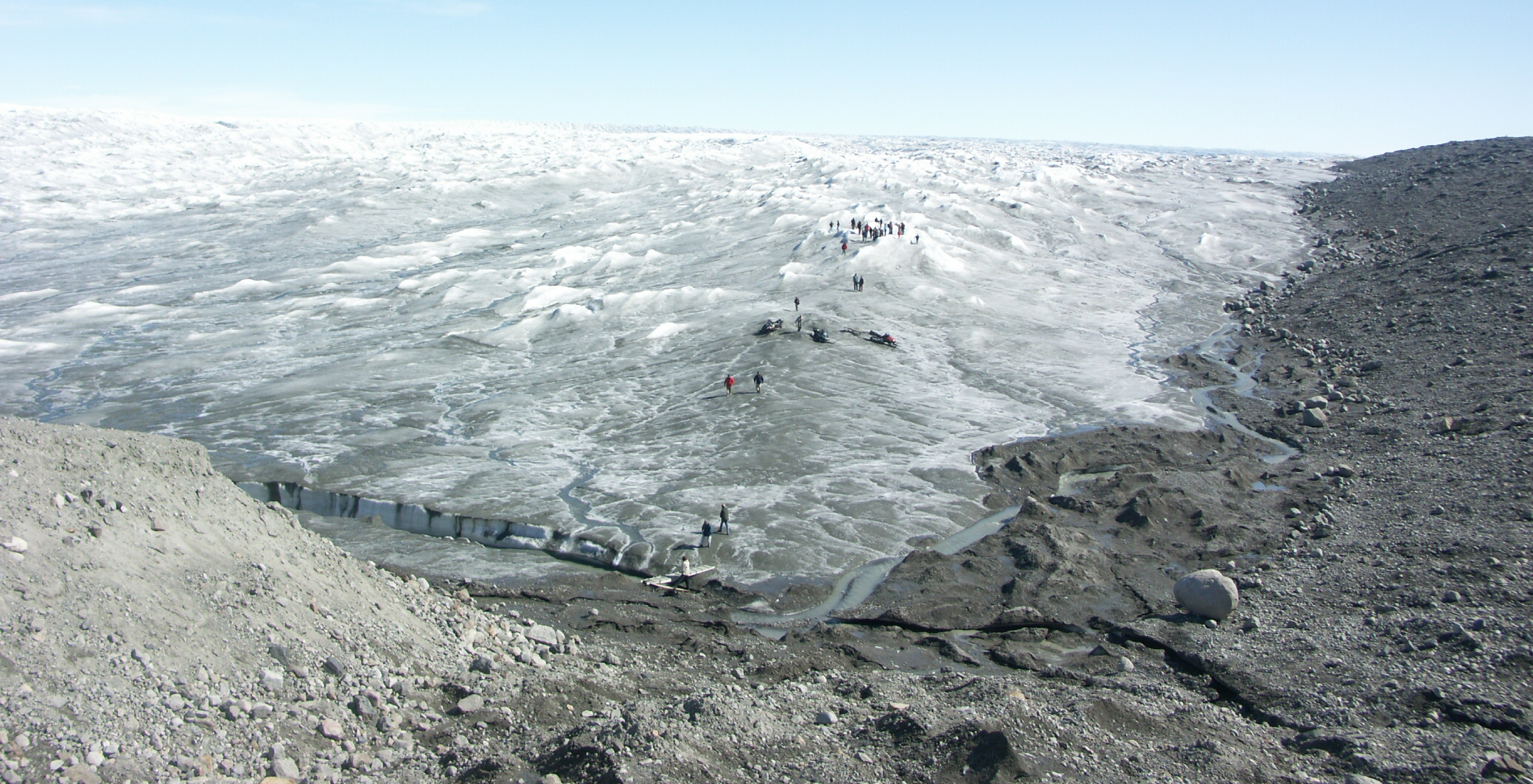
The edge of the Greenland icesheet seen from the road scarp ruin
