= Akuliarusiarsuup Kuua =

River in Greenland

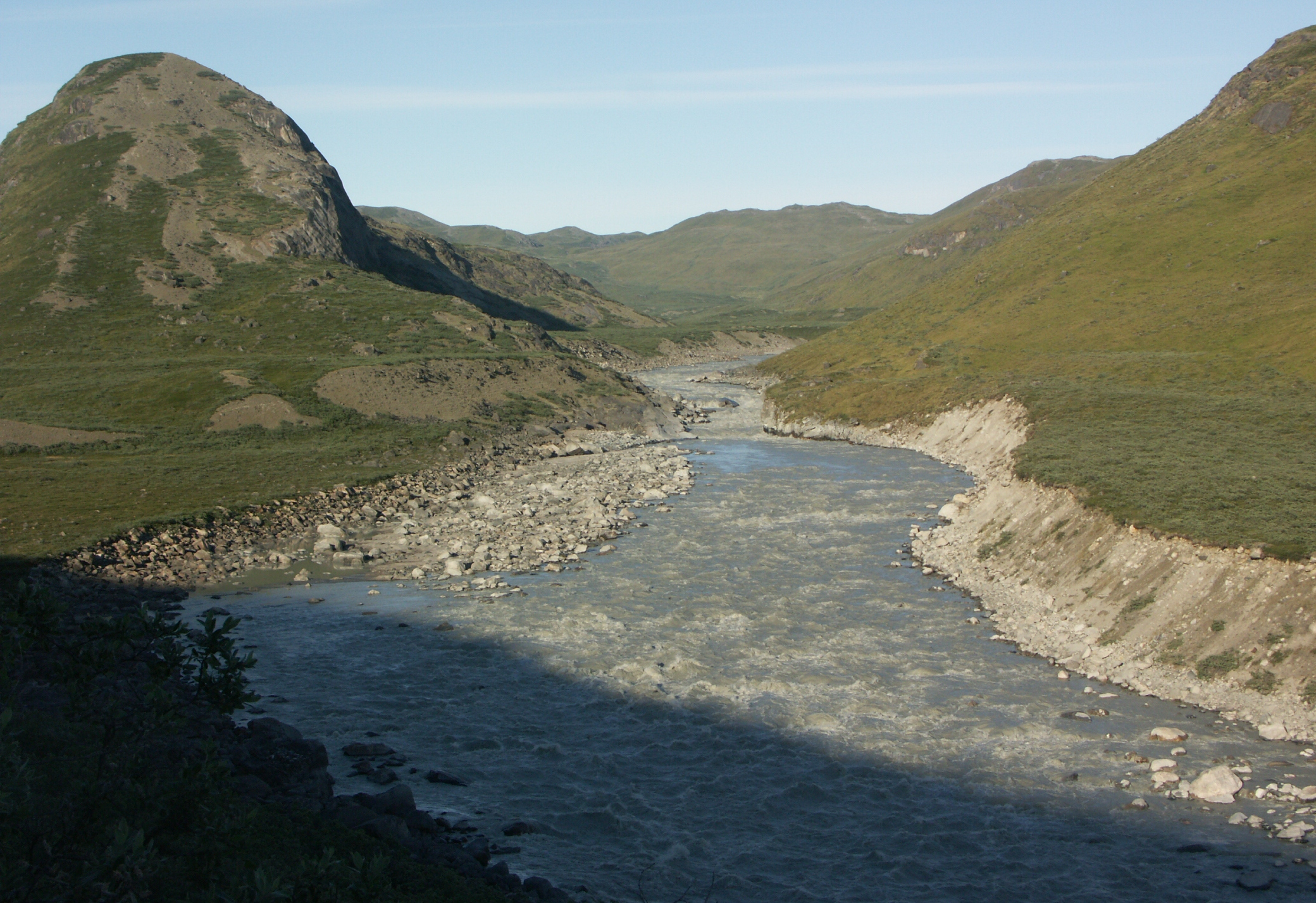
- Riffles in the lower run of Akuliarusiarsuup Kuua, south-west of Sugar Loaf (left)

Location
- Country: Greenland

Physical characteristics
- Source
  - elevation: 250 m (820 ft)
- Mouth: Qinnguata Kuussua
  - coordinates: 67°01′10″N 50°39′20″W
  - elevation: 10 m (33 ft)
- Length: 30 km (19 mi)

Akuliarusiarsuup Kuua (Danish: Sandflugtdalen) is a river and valley of the same name in the Qeqqata municipality in central-western Greenland. Its source is the meltwater outflow from Russell Glacier, an outflow of the Greenland ice sheet. The river is a tributary of Qinnguata Kuussua, the main river in the Kangerlussuaq area. For most of its run, the river flows very slowly through the sandur basin of the valley, forming meanders amongst large fields of glacial silt quicksand. The climate is polar continental, with the area receiving very little rainfall.

== Geography ==
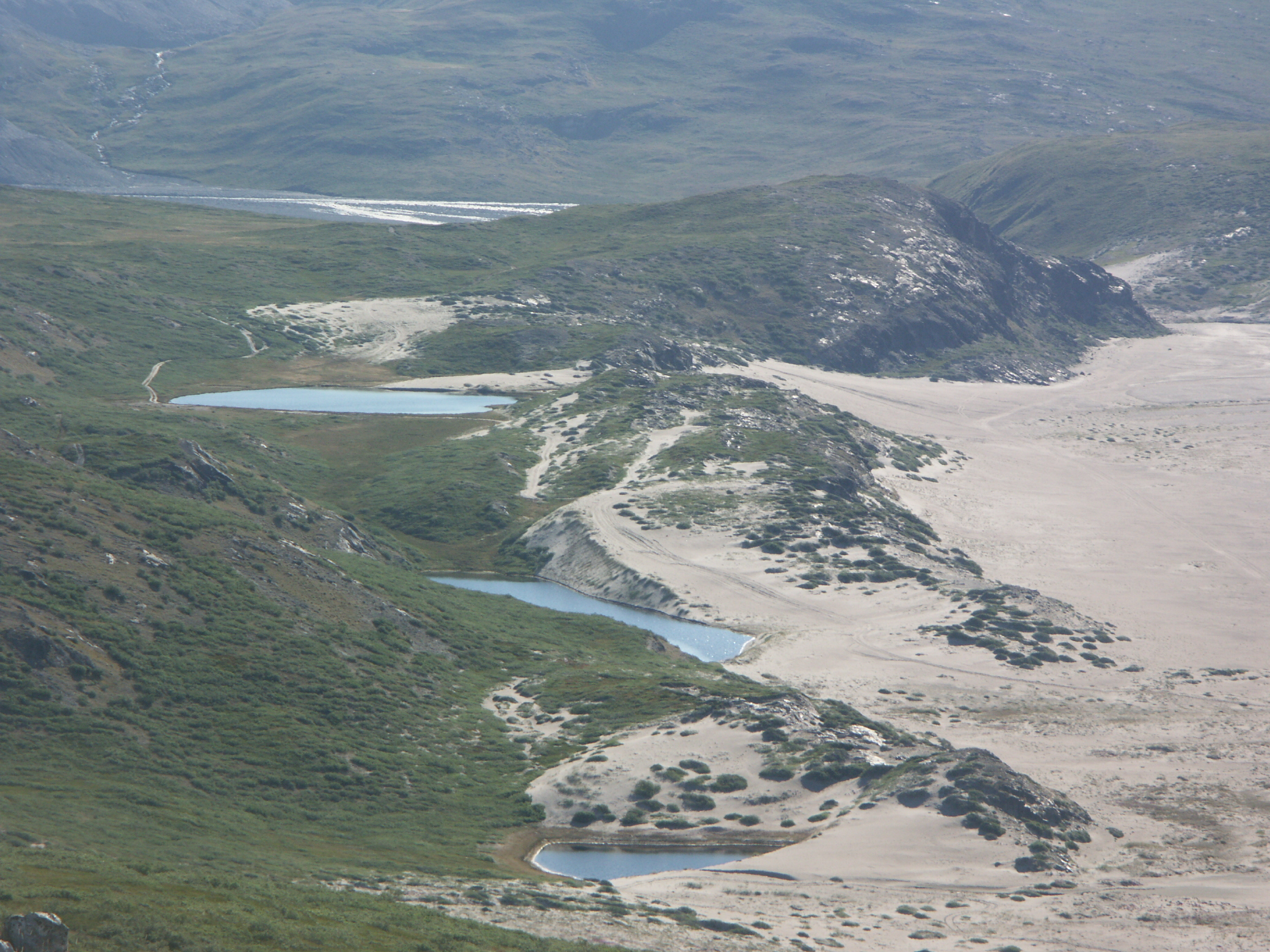
Overgrown dunes and quicksands in central Akuliarusiarsuup Kuua

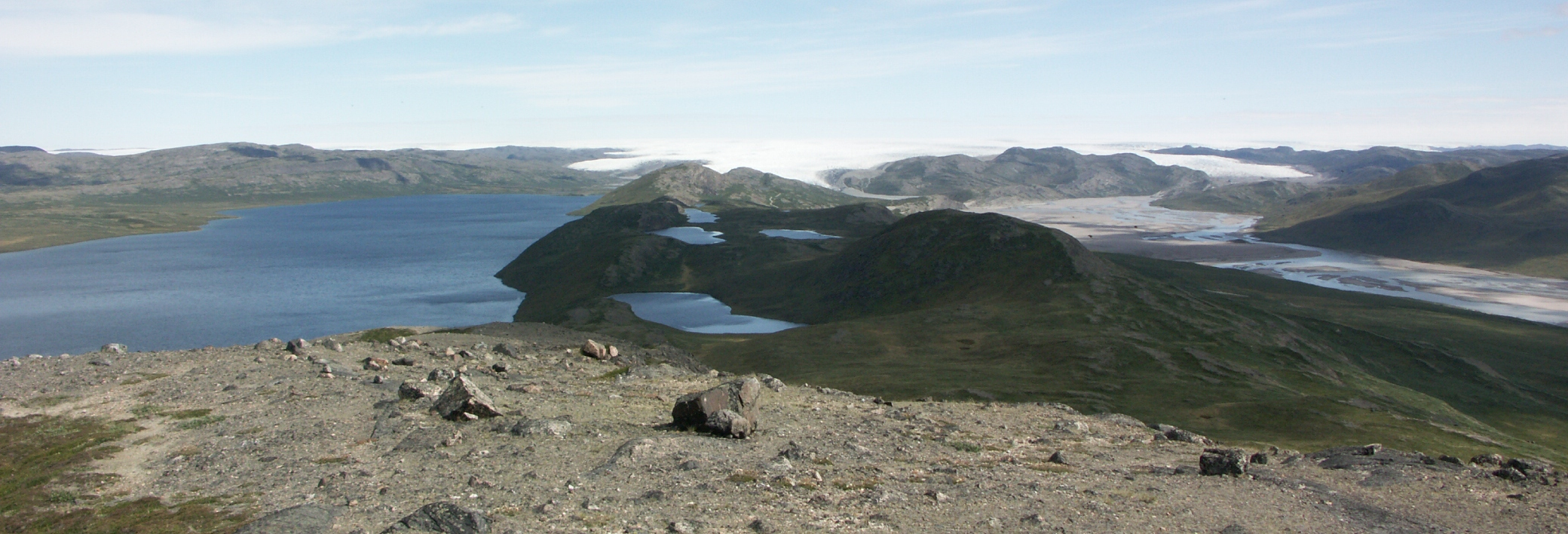
Aajuitsup Tasia, Greenland Ice Sheet, and Akuliarusiarsuup Kuua valley

Several meltwater outflow streams from the base of the Russell Glacier (67°05′48″N 50°14′50″W) form the Akuliarusiarsuup Kuua river. The valley is 30 km (19 mi) long, oriented east-north-east to west-south-west. From the north it is bounded by a low-lying (300–400m) ridge − part of the Kangaamiut dike swarm − separating it from large glacial lakes of Aajuitsup Tasia and Sanningasoq. On the southern side the boundary is formed by an exposed, barren, and flattened ridge of Akuliarusiarsuk.

The lower part of the valley narrows down in the gorge between Akuliarusiarsuk ridge in the south and lone-standing Sugar Loaf mountain in the north, forming waterfalls. In the immediate vicinity of Kangerlussuaq at approximately 67°01′10″N 50°39′20″W the river empties into a larger river, Qinnguata Kuussua, again amongst wide fields of quicksands. The narrow estuary of the latter at the end of Kangerlussuaq Fjord was referred to as Watson River during American occupation of the Bluie West Eight air base at what is today Kangerlussuaq.
