= Russell Glacier (Greenland) =

Glacier in Greenland

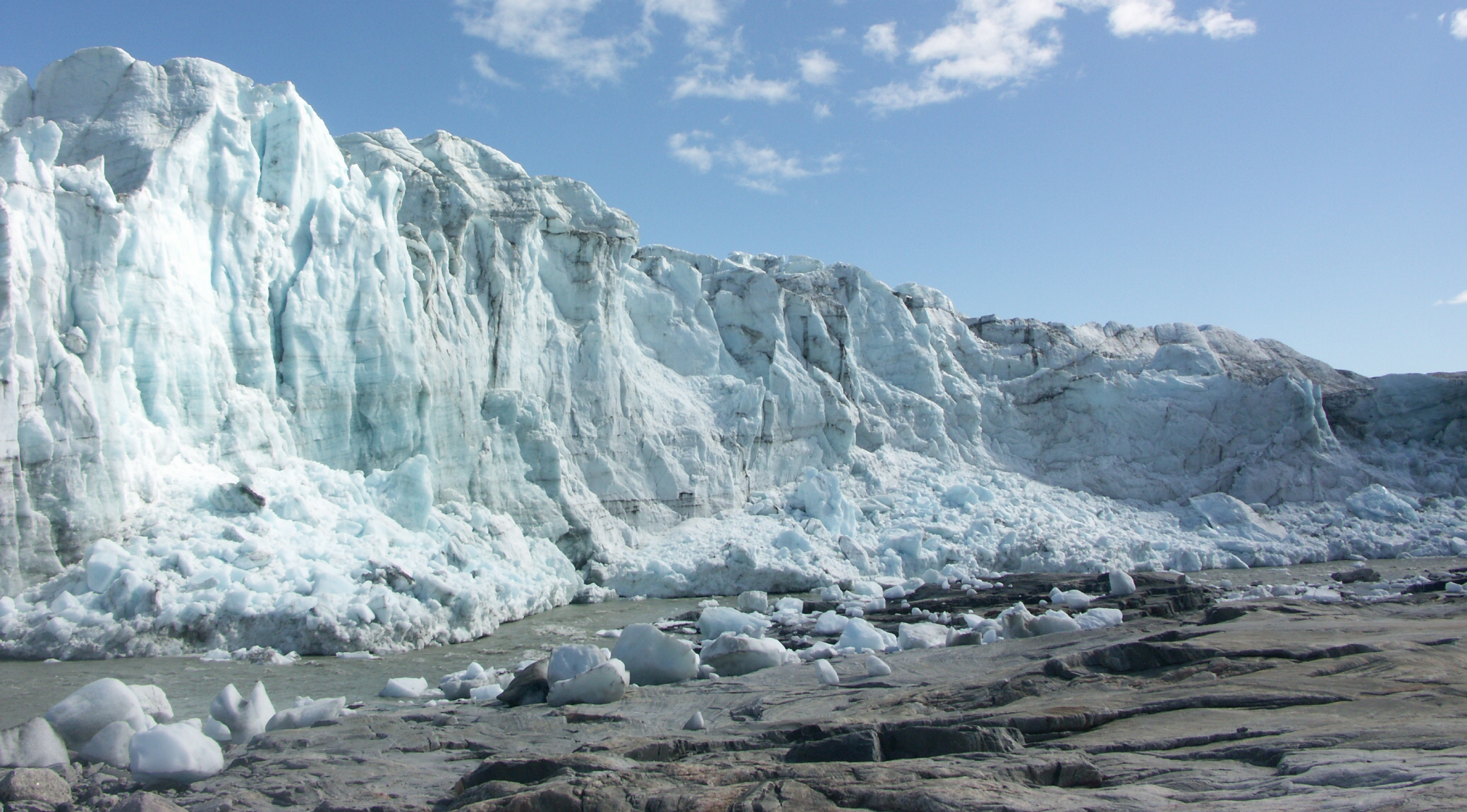
- Russell Glacier: the fresh meltwater outflow and remains of berg bombardment

- Location within Greenland
- Location: Isunngua, Qeqqata, Greenland
- Coordinates: 67°05′45″N 50°13′00″W
- Terminus: Akuliarusiarsuup Kuua

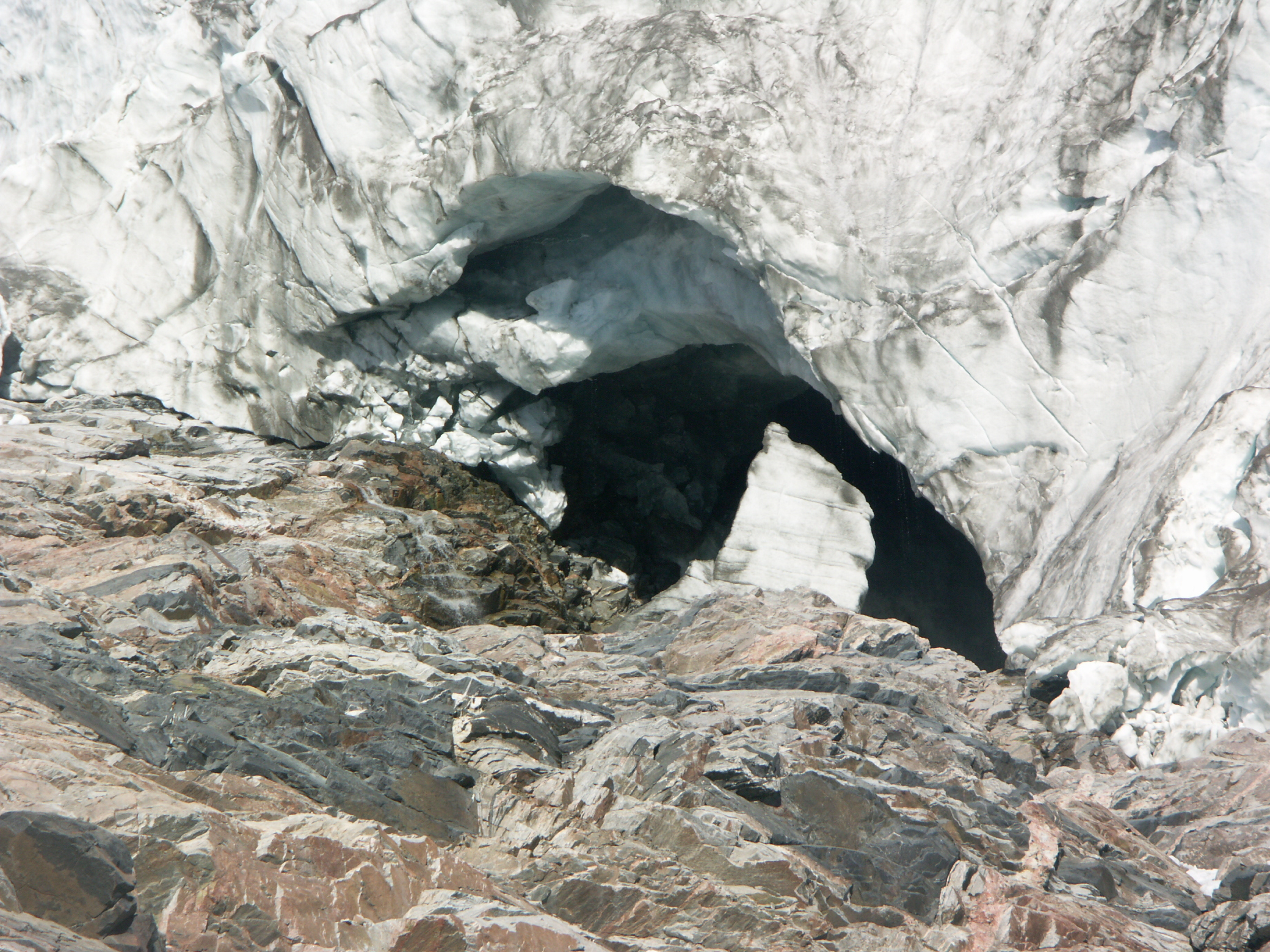
One of the caves leading to the glacier base.

Russell Glacier (Danish: Russells Gletscher) is a glacier in the Qeqqata municipality in central-western Greenland. It flows from the Greenland ice sheet (Greenlandic: Sermersuaq) in the western direction. The front of the glacier is located 25 km (16 mi) east of Kangerlussuaq. It is active, advancing 25 m (82 ft) every year, and, due to easy access from Kangerlussuaq, it remains a popular place for tourists to visit.

== Geography ==
The ice sheet outflow ending in Russell Glacier is bounded on the north by the tundra highland of Isunngua and on the south by an exposed, barren, flattened ridge of Akuliarusiarsuk. Several meltwater outflow streams from the base of the glacier form the Akuliarusiarsuup Kuua river, which flows west-southwest towards Kangerlussuaq. The sandur basin of the outflow river forming the valley of the same name (Danish: Sandflugtdalen) is very shallow; shallow enough to form quicksand fields several kilometers long.

Directly to the west of the glacier is a large lake, the 2x10km Aajuitsup Tasia. Due to the minimal height differential, its waters are not conjoint with the meltwater outflow lake immediately to the west of Russell Glacier.

A sibling, unnamed glacier approximately 7 km (4.3 mi) to the southeast of Russell Glacier is the source of the wide outflow meltwater river of Qinnguata Kuussua. The confluence of the latter and the Akuliarusiarsuup Kuua river flowing from Russell Glacier is located at the eastern outskirts of the Kangerlussuaq settlement near the end of Kangerlussuaq Fjord, and used to be known as Watson River.

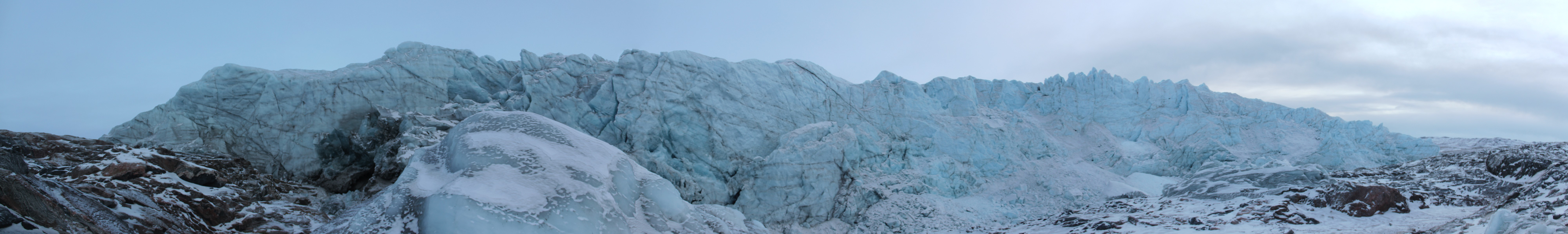
View of the Glacier

== Methane cycling below the glacier ==
A 2014 study, based on subglacial drainage samples (dominated by Pseudomonadota), found evidence of methane cycling below the ice sheet of the Russell Glacier. During the study, the most widespread surface melt on record in the past 120 years in Greenland was observed on 12 July 2012; unfrozen water was present on almost the entire ice sheet surface (98.6%). The findings indicate that methanotrophs could serve as a biological methane sink in the subglacial ecosystem and, at least during the sample time, the region was a source of atmospheric methane. Scaled dissolved methane (CH_{4}) flux during the four months of the summer melt season was estimated at 990 Mg CH_{4}. Because the Russell-Leverett Glacier is representative of similar Greenland outlet glaciers, the researchers concluded that the Greenland Ice Sheet may represent a significant global methane source.

== See also ==
- List of glaciers in Greenland
- Deglaciation
- Leverett Glacier (Antarctica)
