= Kangerlussuaq Fjord =

Fjord in Greenland

- Søndre Strømfjord
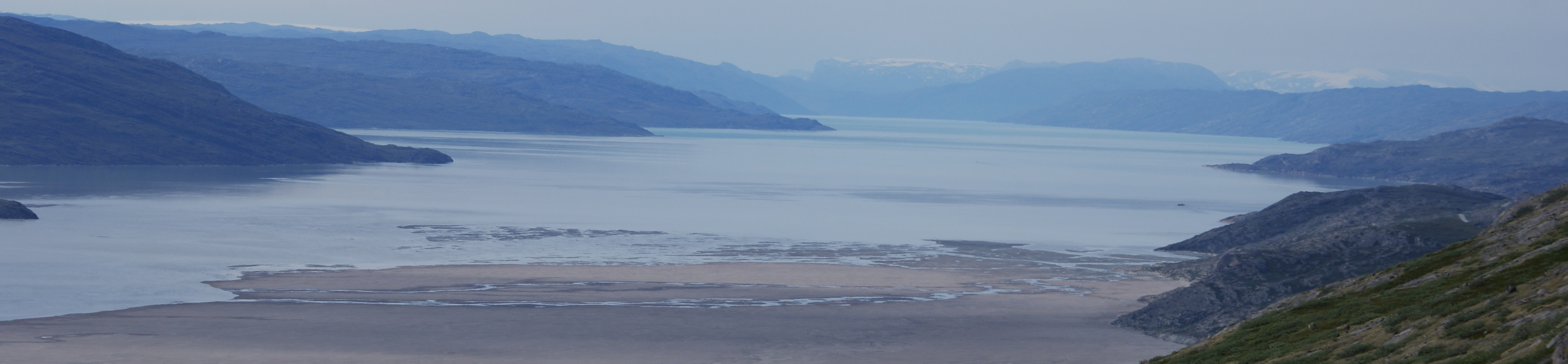
- Head of Kangerlussuaq Fjord

- Location in Greenland
- Location: Arctic
- Coordinates: 66°30′N 52°7′W
- Ocean/sea sources: Davis Strait
- Basin countries: Greenland

Kangerlussuaq Fjord (old spelling: Kangerdlugssuaq, Danish: Søndre Strømfjord) is a long fjord in the Qeqqata municipality in central-western Greenland. The fjord is 190 km (120 mi) long and between 1.5 km (0.93 mi) and 8 km (5.0 mi) wide, flowing from the estuary of Qinnguata Kuussua river to the southwest, and emptying into the Davis Strait. It is the longest fjord of western Greenland.

== Geography ==
The head of the fjord is located at 67°00′18″N 50°41′35″W, at the estuary of the Qinnguata Kuussua river flowing from the Russell Glacier of the Greenland ice sheet (Greenlandic: Sermersuaq). The fjord mouth is located at 66°01′40″N 53°32′00″W, south of the Simiutaq Island. Another, smaller waterway connects to the sea to the north of the island.

Kangerlussuaq Fjord does not have any tributary fjords, with a fairly uniform coastline. Small hills of the Kangaamiut dike swarm, such as the highlands of Tarajornitsut, dominate the coast of the inner parts of the fjord, transforming into steep mountain ranges towards the mouth. In that it is different from fjords of Norway, or indeed many other fjords in Greenland, the coast of which is flanked by progressively smaller mountains.

Alluvial sediments from Qinnguata Kuussua, which carries meltwater from the ice sheet give rise to a distinct emerald coloring of the fjord waters for several kilometers from the fjord head. Silt accumulation at the estuary formed patches of quicksand of variable size up to a kilometer into the fjord.

This fjord marks the border between the two geographic regions of Queen Ingrid Land and King Frederick IX Land.

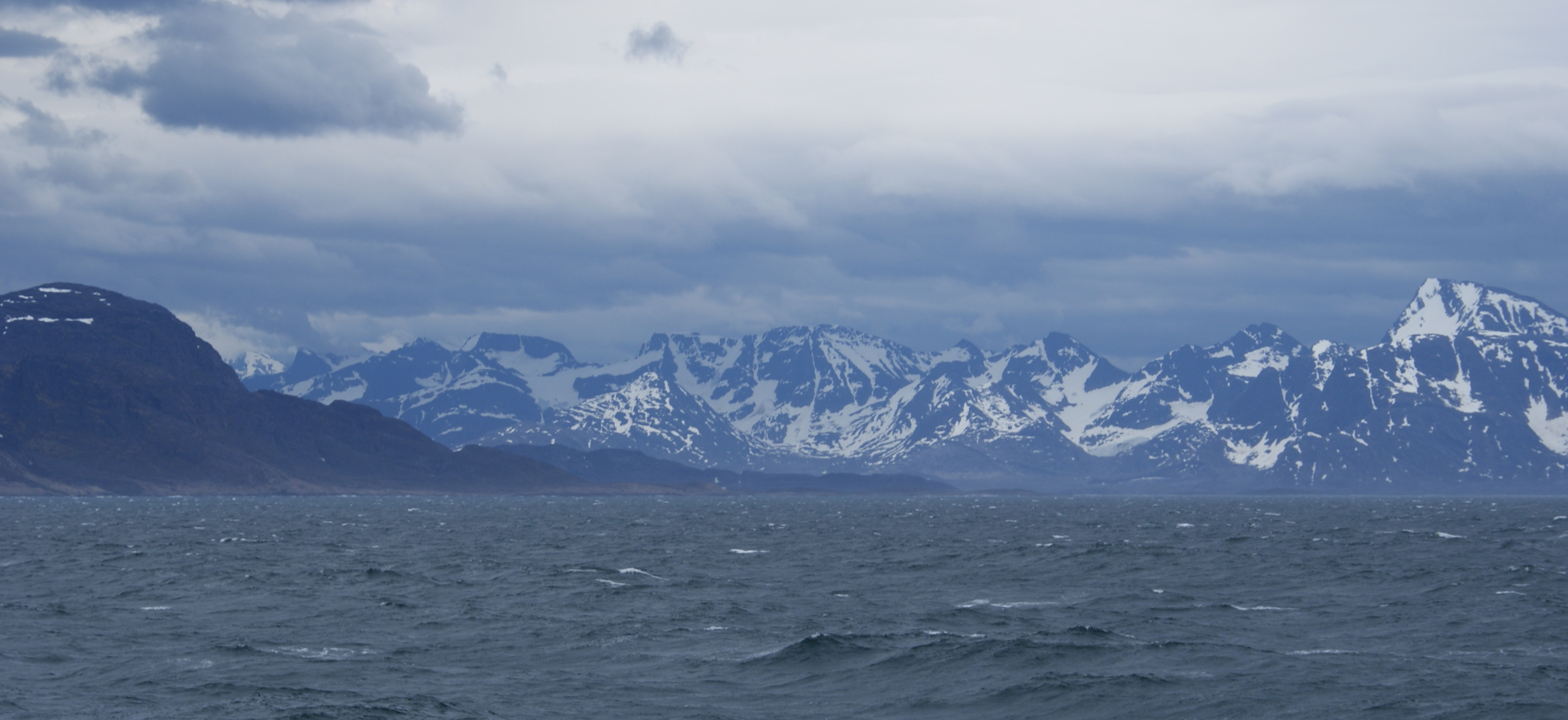
Rain and wind in Davis Strait at the mouth of Kangerlussuaq Fjord

== Settlement ==
The only settlement on the shores of the fjord is Kangerlussuaq, located just north of the river estuary at the head of the fjord. Kangaamiut is located on a small island, on the shores of Davis Strait, approximately 26 km (16 mi) south of the fjord mouth.

== Transport ==
The fjord is navigable in its entire length. Cruise ships, such as Norway's Hurtigruten and supply ships of Royal Greenland navigate the fjord, mooring at the Kangerlussuaq port, west of Kangerlussuaq Airport.
