= Kangaamiut dike swarm =

Large geological structure in Greenland

The Kangaamiut dike swarm (old spelling: Kangâmiut) is a 2.04 billion year old dike swarm located in the Qeqqata region of western Greenland. The dikes cut Archean orthogneisses and are exposed along approximately 150 km (93 mi) of the coast and a similar distance up to the inland ice to the east, covering an area of about 18,000 km^{2} (6,900 mi^{2}). To the north it is bounded by the paleoproterozoic Ikertooq shear zone (old spelling: Ikertôq) while to the south the boundary is gradational with a gradual reduction in the density of dikes. The dike swarm was intruded during a phase of extensional tectonics. They were later deformed during the Nagssugtoqidian orogeny, with the amount of strain increasing towards the Iqertooq shear zone.
