= Kangerlussuaq =

Settlement in Greenland

Kangerlussuaq Søndre Strømfjord
- Buildings east of Kangerlussuaq Airport

- Location within Greenland
- Coordinates: 67°00′31″N 50°41′21″W
- State: Kingdom of Denmark
- Constituent country: Greenland
- Municipality: Qeqqata
- Built as military base: 1941
- Transitioned to settlement: 1992

Government
  - Mayor: Albrecht Kreutzmann

Population (2025)
  - Total: 399
- Time zone: UTC−02:00 (Western Greenland Time)
  - Summer (DST): UTC−01:00 (Western Greenland Summer Time)
- Postal code: 3910

Kangerlussuaq (Greenlandic pronunciation: [kaˌŋɜˈɬːusːuɑq]; lit. 'Big Fjord'; Danish: Søndre Strømfjord) is a settlement in western Greenland in the Qeqqata municipality located at the head of the fjord of the same name. The town and airport were built as a U.S. base during and after World War II, when the site was known as Bluie West-8 and then Sondrestrom Air Base, but transitioned to a Greenlandic settlement in 1992. Kangerlussuaq Airport was Greenland's primary air transport hub until the rebuilt and expanded Nuuk Airport opened in 2024.

The Kangerlussuaq area is also home to Greenland's most diverse terrestrial fauna, including muskoxen, caribou, and gyrfalcons. The settlement's economy and population of 399 is almost entirely reliant on the airport and tourist industry. It is the only town in Greenland which is not located on the proper ocean, being situated at the end of a 160 km long fjord, although it still has a coastline on the ocean.

== Geography ==
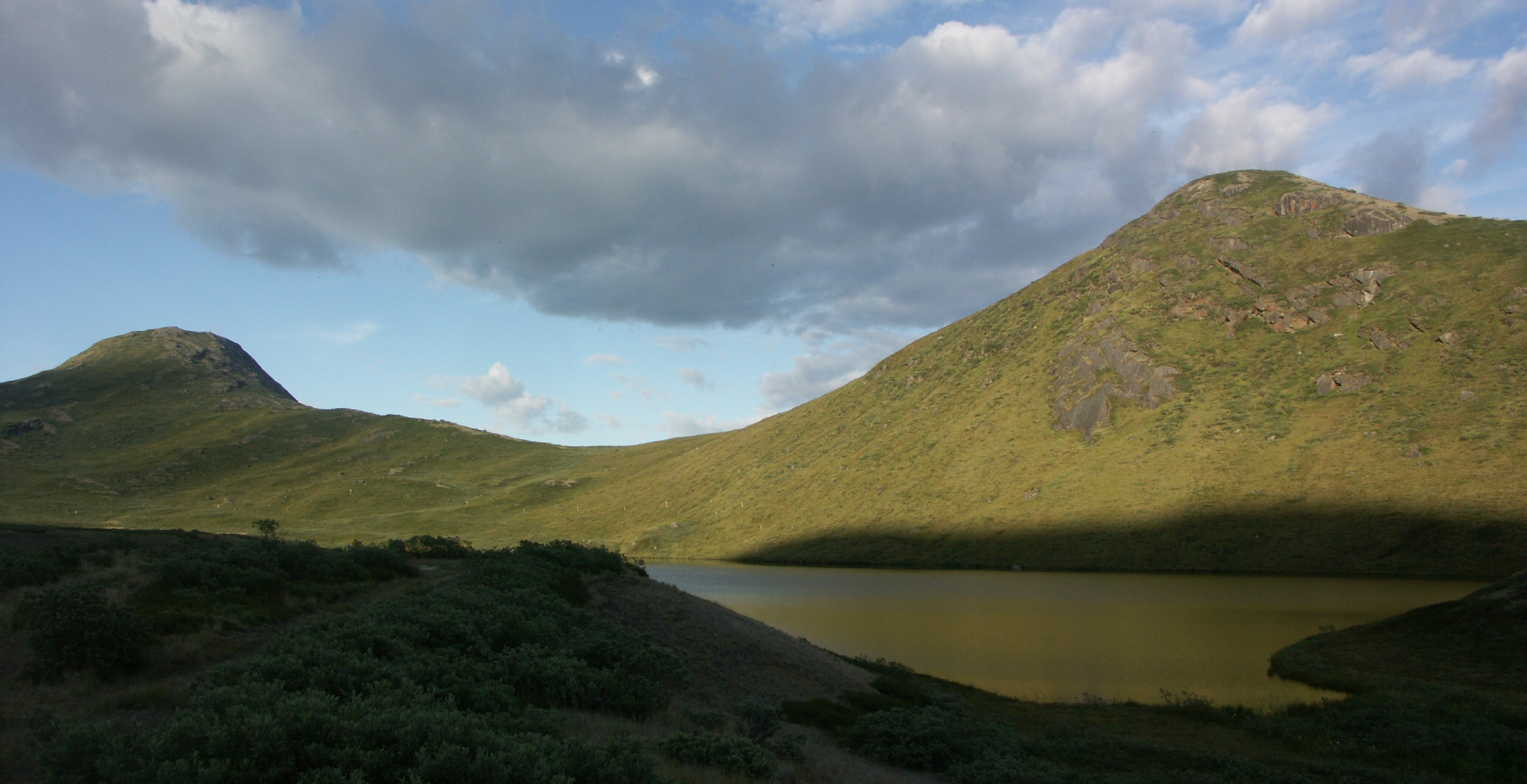
Midnight sun under Sugarloaf, Kangerlussuaq

Kangerlussuaq occupies an alluvial flatland on the far end of the 190 km long Kangerlussuaq Fjord, straddling both sides of the Qinnguata Kuussua river estuary. On the East of Kangerlussuaq is a confluence of the two major regional rivers, the Qinnguata Kuussua and Akuliarusiarsuup Kuua. The valley of the latter forms large quicksand plains. Both rivers originate from the Russell Glacier. The edge of the glacier is easily accessible and is a major tourist attraction from the town, as is the edge of the ice sheet in the Isunngua highlands to its northeast.

Highlands such as Tarajornitsut bound Kangerlussuaq from the north and south. To the southeast behind lake Tasersuatsiaq, which provides fresh water to the town, is the vast highland of Ammalortup Nunaa, the original region artificially populated with 27 muskoxen.

The town is situated about 50 kilometers (31 mi) north of the Arctic Circle, and is the starting point for the Arctic Circle Trail.

== History ==
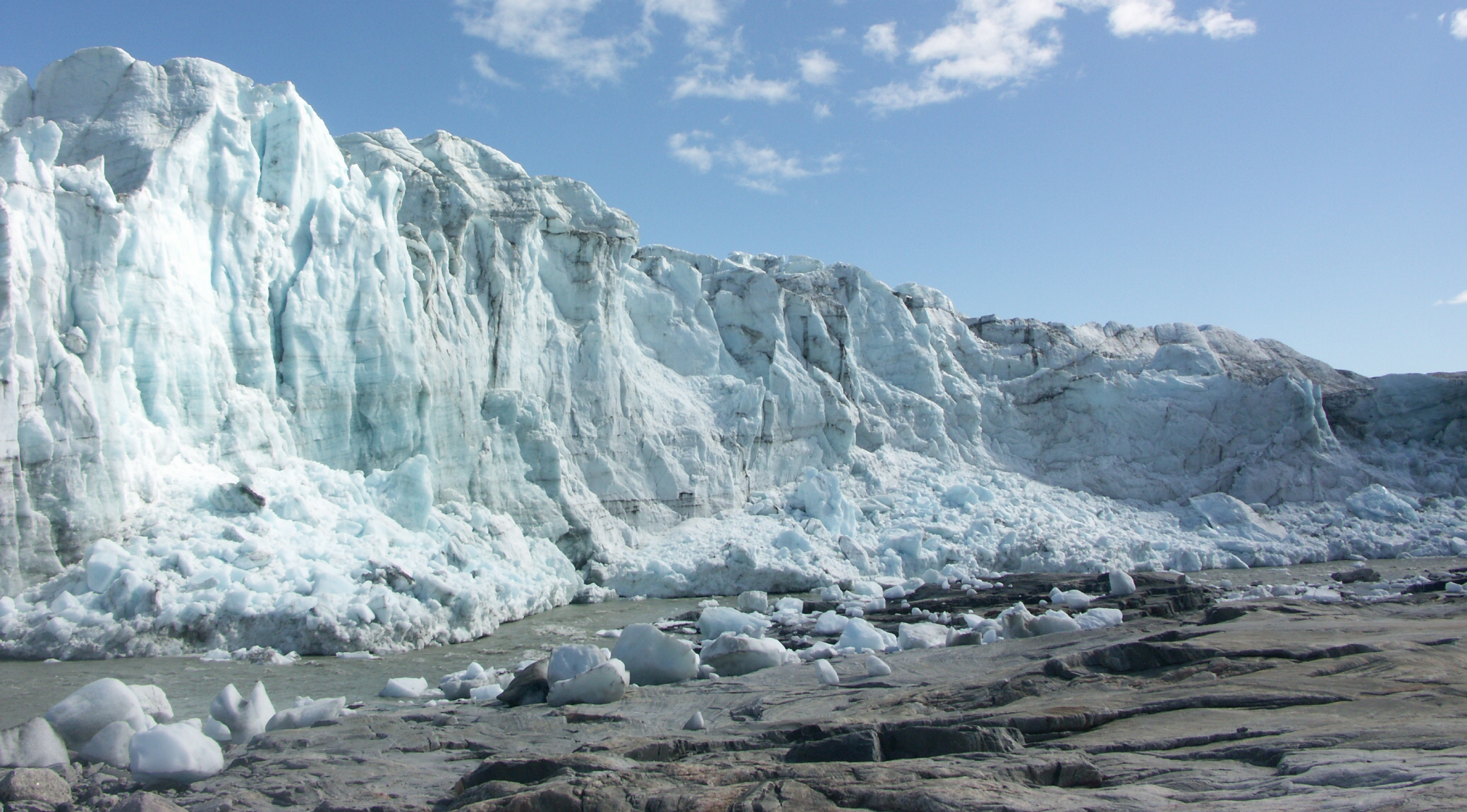
Russell Glacier, flowing down from Sermersuaq. Visible is the fresh meltwater outflow and remains of berg bombardment.

Kangerlussuaq was founded at the east end of Kangerlussuaq fjord as Bluie West-8 on 7 October 1941, under the supervision of Colonel Bernt Balchen of the United States Army Air Forces (USAAF). Following the fall of Denmark to Germany in World War II, US forces assumed security for Greenland, building several bases including Bluie West-1 to the south in Narsarsuaq and Bluie West-8 at the Kangerlussuaq fjord.

The base briefly came under Danish control in 1950, but following mounting concerns about the Cold War threat, a new agreement saw the United States reopen Bluie West-8 under the name of Sondrestrom Air Base on 27 April 1951.

Sondrestrom's main mission post-WW2 was to serve as a supply site and control centre for the DYE stations, including two sites on the Greenland ice sheet, which were an extension of the Distant Early Warning Line (DEW). It was designated as DYE-6 in this regard.

In the mid-1950s, transatlantic civilian flights began using the air base for refuelling. In 1956, Scandinavian Airlines (SAS) was flying a Polar route service on a routing of Copenhagen - Sondre Stromfjord (now Kangerlussuaq) - Winnipeg - Los Angeles. The north side of the airport was designated as the civilian sector of the airport. A hotel and associated support facilities were built there by SAS which remain in use today.

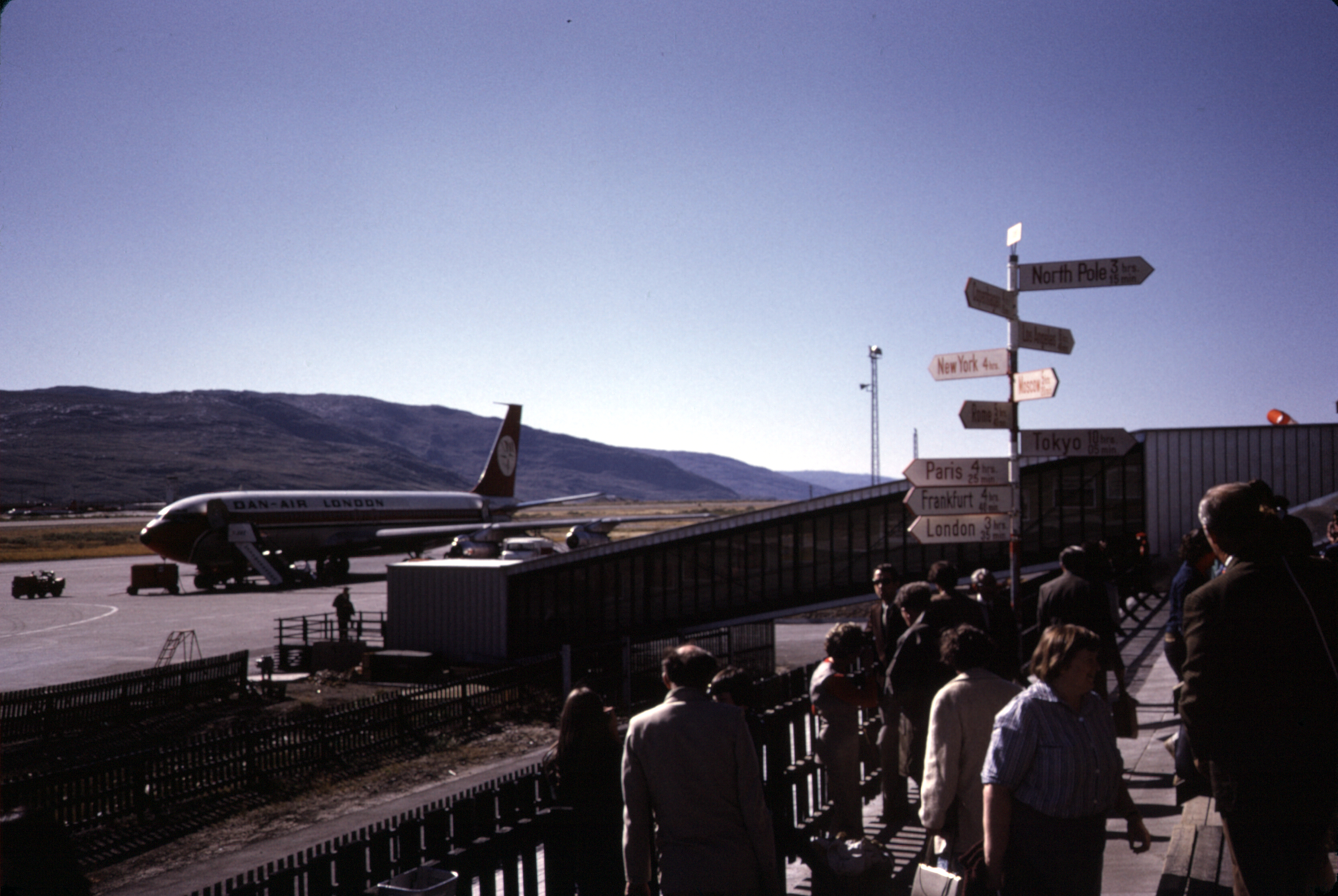
The airport in 1974

This use enabled air travel to Greenland, but international refuelling stops declined in the 1960s as airliners gained greater range. However, Kangerlussuaq Airport long served as Greenland's most important transport hub, as it was the only civilian airport in Greenland large enough to support large long-range airplanes such as Airbus A330s used by Air Greenland.

=== Transition from U.S. base to settlement ===
Following the fall of the Soviet Union, the usefulness of the base was greatly diminished as the DYE and DEW Line stations were closed. The last U.S. Air Force personnel left the base on 30 September 1992. The base subsequently came under Greenlandic Home Rule and was renamed using the Kalaallisut dialect of the West Greenland Inuit and became a settlement. Almost all of the permanent structures in the town were built during the U.S. occupation of the site. A continued legacy is that electricity is supplied at a frequency of 60 Hz in Kangerlussuaq (U.S. standard) whereas the rest of Greenland is supplied at 50 Hz.

The airport and facilities including almost all buildings in the town are owned and operated by Greenland Airports. It was not until 2002 that responsibility for public services in the town itself was transferred to Qeqqata municipality. Since then Kangerlussuaq has undergone a 'normalisation' process where functions have slowly been transitioned from Greenland Airports to the municipality, as well as more privatisation of some buildings.

A company known as Kangerlussuaq Tourism A/S was established in the 1990s to promote and develop tourism in Kangerlussuaq. The tourism sector in Kangerlussuaq has since transitioned mostly into the hands of private companies since the 2010s.

=== Closure of hub ===
In 2016, the Greenlandic Government decided to rebuild and expand airports closer to major population centres, in the capital Nuuk as well as in Ilulissat and Qaqortoq (new site). The first of these new airports opened in November 2024 when the rebuilt Nuuk Airport opened. This led to the transition of Air Greenland's hub for international and domestic routes to Nuuk. Kangerlussuaq continues to serve domestic flights and a seasonal route to Copenhagen to cater to the tourism industry.

Most economic activity in the town of Kangerlussuaq is based on aviation services, tourism and scientific research support. Its future has therefore been uncertain after the closure as Greenland's aviation hub. Nevertheless, Kangerlussuaq Airport remains one of Greenland's best-equipped airports due to stable weather, favourable terrain and has the longest civilian runway at 2,800 metres. It is also the only place in Greenland which offers road access to the Greenland ice sheet.

== Climate ==
The climate in Kangerlussuaq is subarctic (Köppen Dfc), bordering on tundra climate (Köppen ET) with the area receiving very little rainfall.

Climate data for Kangerlussuaq (south-west), elevation: 50 m, 1991–2020 normals
Month	Jan	Feb	Mar	Apr	May	Jun	Jul	Aug	Sep	Oct	Nov	Dec	Year
Record high °C (°F)	12.3 (54.1)	13.9 (57.0)	14.4 (57.9)	17.8 (64.0)	22.4 (72.3)	25.2 (77.4)	26.6 (79.9)	22.9 (73.2)	21.1 (70.0)	17.1 (62.8)	15.8 (60.4)	11.9 (53.4)	26.6 (79.9)
Mean daily maximum °C (°F)	−13.5 (7.7)	−14.8 (5.4)	−10.8 (12.6)	−0.9 (30.4)	8.4 (47.1)	15.3 (59.5)	16.8 (62.2)	14.0 (57.2)	7.7 (45.9)	−0.8 (30.6)	−7.0 (19.4)	−10.5 (13.1)	0.3 (32.6)
Daily mean °C (°F)	−18.5 (−1.3)	−19.8 (−3.6)	−16.6 (2.1)	−6.2 (20.8)	3.6 (38.5)	10.0 (50.0)	11.2 (52.2)	8.7 (47.7)	3.5 (38.3)	−4.6 (23.7)	−11.3 (11.7)	−15.2 (4.6)	−4.6 (23.7)
Mean daily minimum °C (°F)	−23.3 (−9.9)	−24.9 (−12.8)	−22.2 (−8.0)	−11.6 (11.1)	−1.7 (28.9)	4.2 (39.6)	5.0 (41.0)	3.3 (37.9)	−1.0 (30.2)	−8.7 (16.3)	−15.7 (3.7)	−19.9 (−3.8)	−9.7 (14.5)
Record low °C (°F)	−47.2 (−53.0)	−46.8 (−52.2)	−45.4 (−49.7)	−34.4 (−29.9)	−21.8 (−7.2)	−4.7 (23.5)	−0.7 (30.7)	−4.8 (23.4)	−15.4 (4.3)	−29.7 (−21.5)	−36.3 (−33.3)	−45.5 (−49.9)	−47.2 (−53.0)
Average precipitation mm (inches)	7.9 (0.31)	6.1 (0.24)	5.2 (0.20)	7.6 (0.30)	10.9 (0.43)	13.4 (0.53)	27.6 (1.09)	31.7 (1.25)	22.7 (0.89)	13.1 (0.52)	11.7 (0.46)	9.8 (0.39)	167.7 (6.61)
Average precipitation days (≥ 1.0 mm)	2.9	2.0	1.7	2.3	2.8	3.4	5.2	6.9	5.2	3.8	3.9	3.2	43.3
Average relative humidity (%)	70.2	68.1	66.5	64.1	57.7	55.1	57.2	64.8	67.3	72.9	72.6	71.4	65.7
Source 1: Danish Meteorological Institute
Source 2: NOAA

In July 2012 a gust of warm air resulted in glacier meltwater which wiped out the bridge over the Watson River next to the town.

== Population ==
The population of Kangerlussuaq dropped significantly after the liquidation of the Sondrestrom Air Base. Since then it has increased by more than 80%, although it has begun dropping again in recent years.

As a result of the transition of the closure of Air Greenland's hub at Kangerlussuaq, the population plummeted by 30% from 564 to 399 inhabitants from 2024 to 2025.

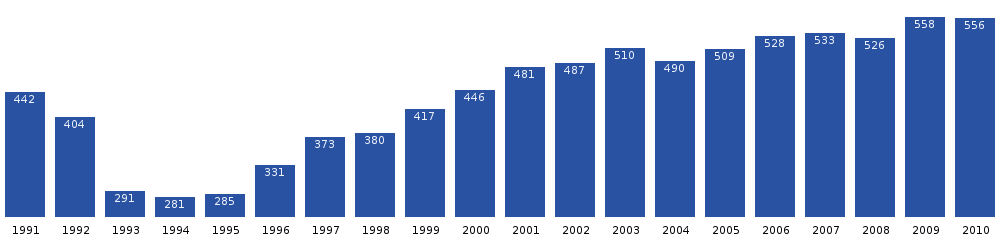
Kangerlussuaq population growth dynamics, 1991–2010. Source: Statistics Greenland

== Transport ==
=== Air ===
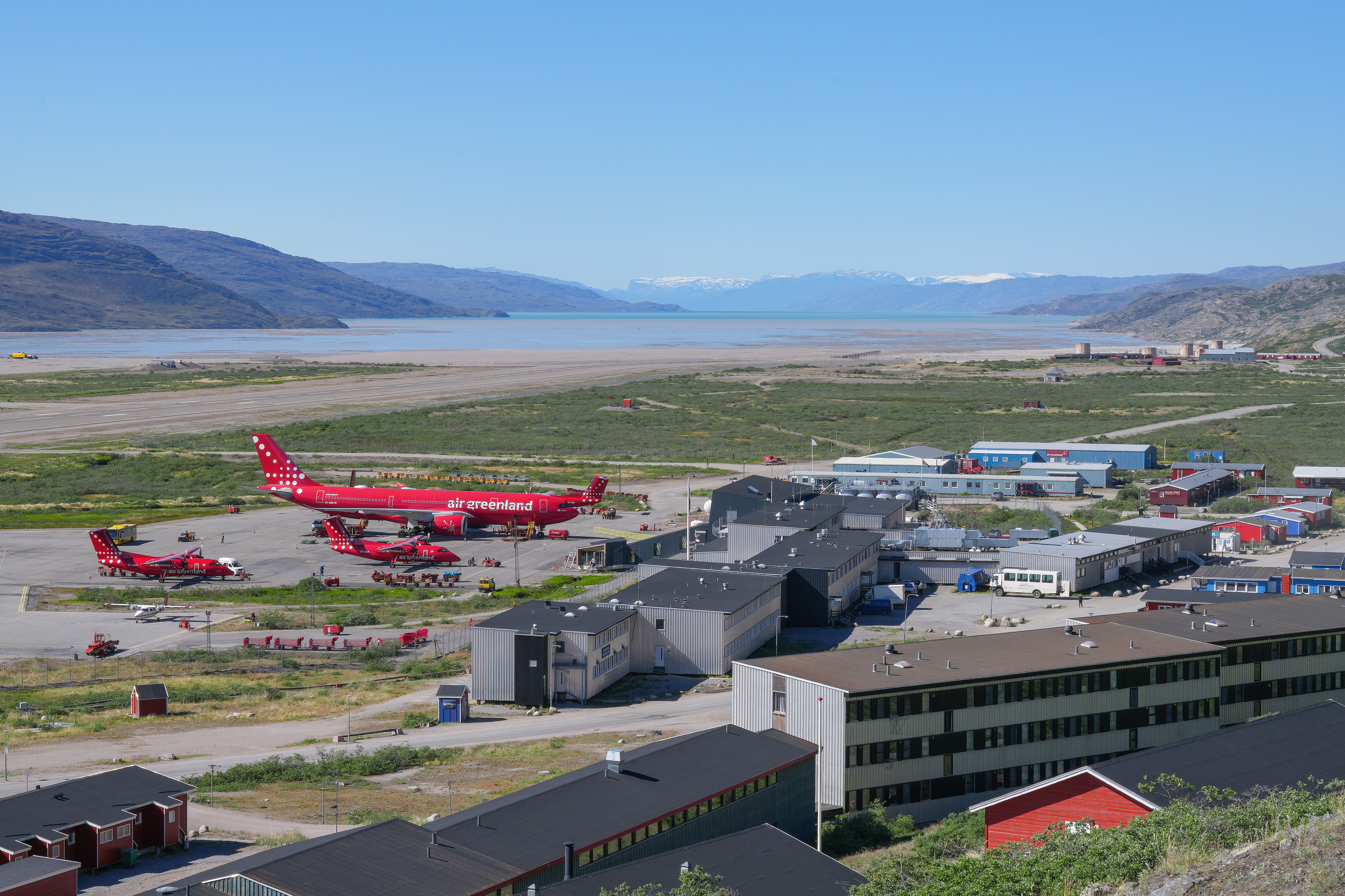
Kangerlussuaq Airport in 2024

Kangerlussuaq Airport is served by domestic flights to Nuuk, Ilulissat and Sisimiut, as well as seasonal flights to Copenhagen.

Kangerlussuaq Airport long served as Greenland's principal hub for domestic and international routes, but lost hub status to Nuuk Airport when a rebuilt and expanded airport opened there in 2024. Nevertheless, Kangerlussuaq Airport remains one of Greenland's best-equipped airports due to stable weather, favourable terrain and has the longest civilian runway at 2,800 metres. As such, it continues to be a vital diversion airport and serves ferry flights.

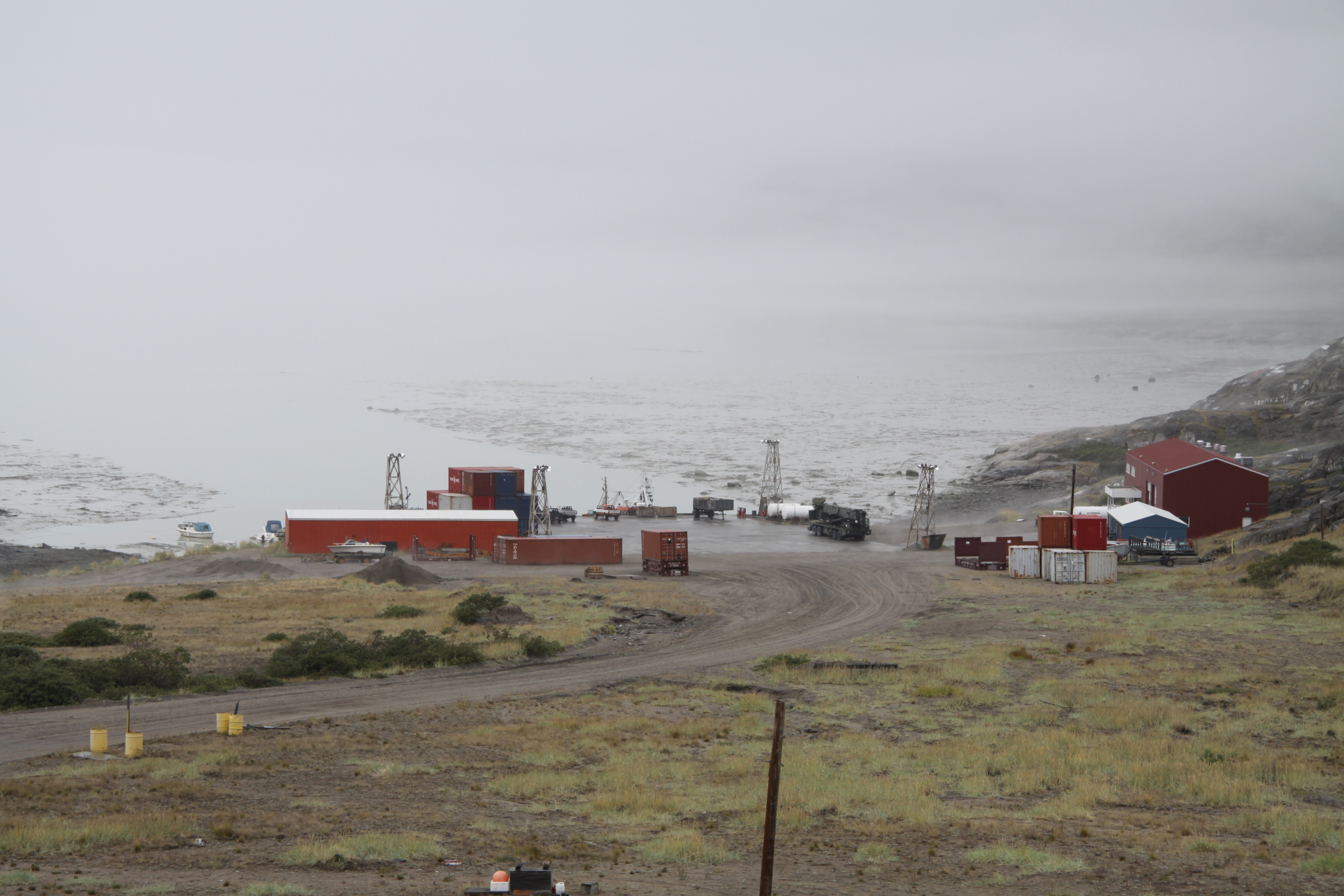
Kangerlussuaq port

=== Sea ===
Kangerlussuaq Fjord is navigable for its entire length. There is a seaport at Kangerlussuaq, 14 kilometres (8.7 mi) west of the town. It is fairly shallow and suitable for small ships only, served only twice per year in summer by Royal Arctic Line. It is also served annually by an oil tanker, petroleum products are carried by pipeline to the airport.

Cruise ships, such as Norway's Hurtigruten, navigate the fjord and anchor outside the port. They go to Kangerlussuaq mainly to exchange passengers by air, but this role is now diminished following a reduction in flights.

Plans were approved in 2018 to build a new deep port, around 10 kilometres (6.2 mi) west of the present one, along with an access road.

=== Road ===
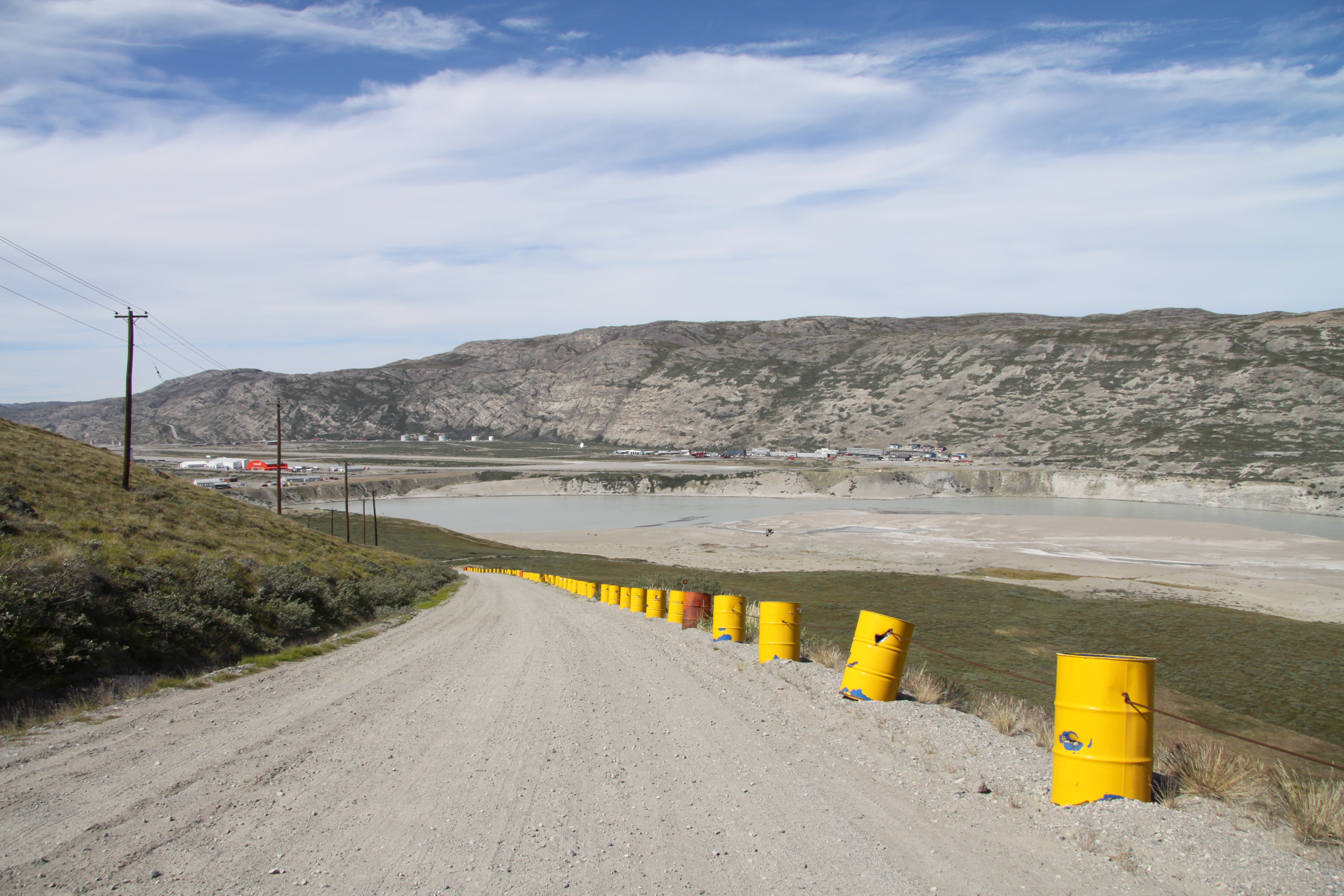
A road in the vicinity of Kangerlussuaq

The existing road network in Kangerlussuaq was built by the U.S. military when it was Sondrestrom Air Base, linking communication sites, the port and the Sondrestrom Upper Atmospheric Research Facility. Kangerlussuaq has the largest extra-urban road network of any settlement in Greenland (not counting streets inside settlements).

In 1999, Nausta A/S built a 35 km long road from Kangerlussuaq through Isunngua on behalf of Volkswagen to the edge of the Greenland ice sheet, where they conducted winter car testing. Volkswagen left in 2005 and the road was returned to the municipality and is now used for tourism and research purposes.

These roads in and around Kangerlussuaq total approximately 70 km (43 mi), of which 15 km (9 mi) is paved with asphalt.

==== ATV track to Sisimiut ====
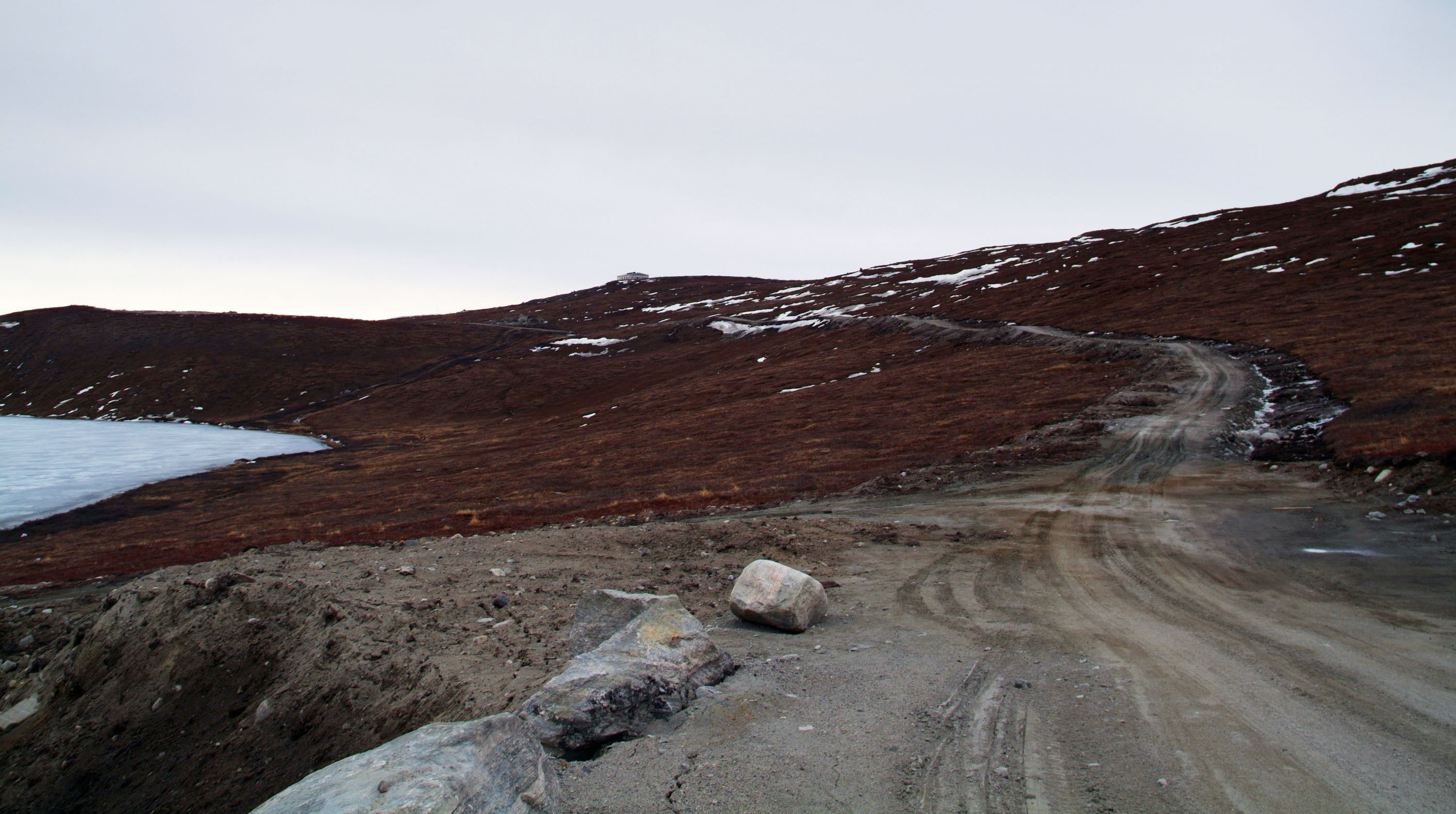
The road from Kangerlussuaq to Sisimiut, under construction as of May 2022

A 130 km (81 mi) long track between the towns of Sisimiut and Kangerlussuaq, traversable by all-terrain vehicles, UTVs and off-road vehicles (Unimog-type vehicles) was opened in 2025. It is dubbed the 'Arctic Circle Track', and follows a similar route to the Arctic Circle Trail. The total distance from Kangerlussuaq to Sisimiut is 153 km (including existing roads to the port).

It is the first land based connection between two towns in Greenland, excluding snowmobile and dog-sled transport in winter. The track is rudimentary in construction, built in 2021–2025, at a cost of 25 million DKK (€3M).

It is envisioned that this track will be upgraded in the future to a proper gravel road, but at an estimated cost of 500 million Danish krone (€67M), no timeline is in place.

== Scientific research ==
Kangerlussuaq is unique in Greenland and the arctic in that it provides easy access to the Greenland ice sheet via road and air. As a result, it has served as a hub for scientific research, ranging from terrestrial and marine arctic ecosystems to geology and atmospheric research. The roads, ice sheet and flat areas around Kangerlussuaq have also been used as proving grounds for automobile testing in cold climates.

The Greenlandic government promotes research by offering support services, such as accommodation in converted barracks, through the company Kangerlussuaq International Science Support (KISS) which is owned by Greenland Airports. Private companies also offer support.

=== Sondrestrom Upper Atmospheric Research Facility ===
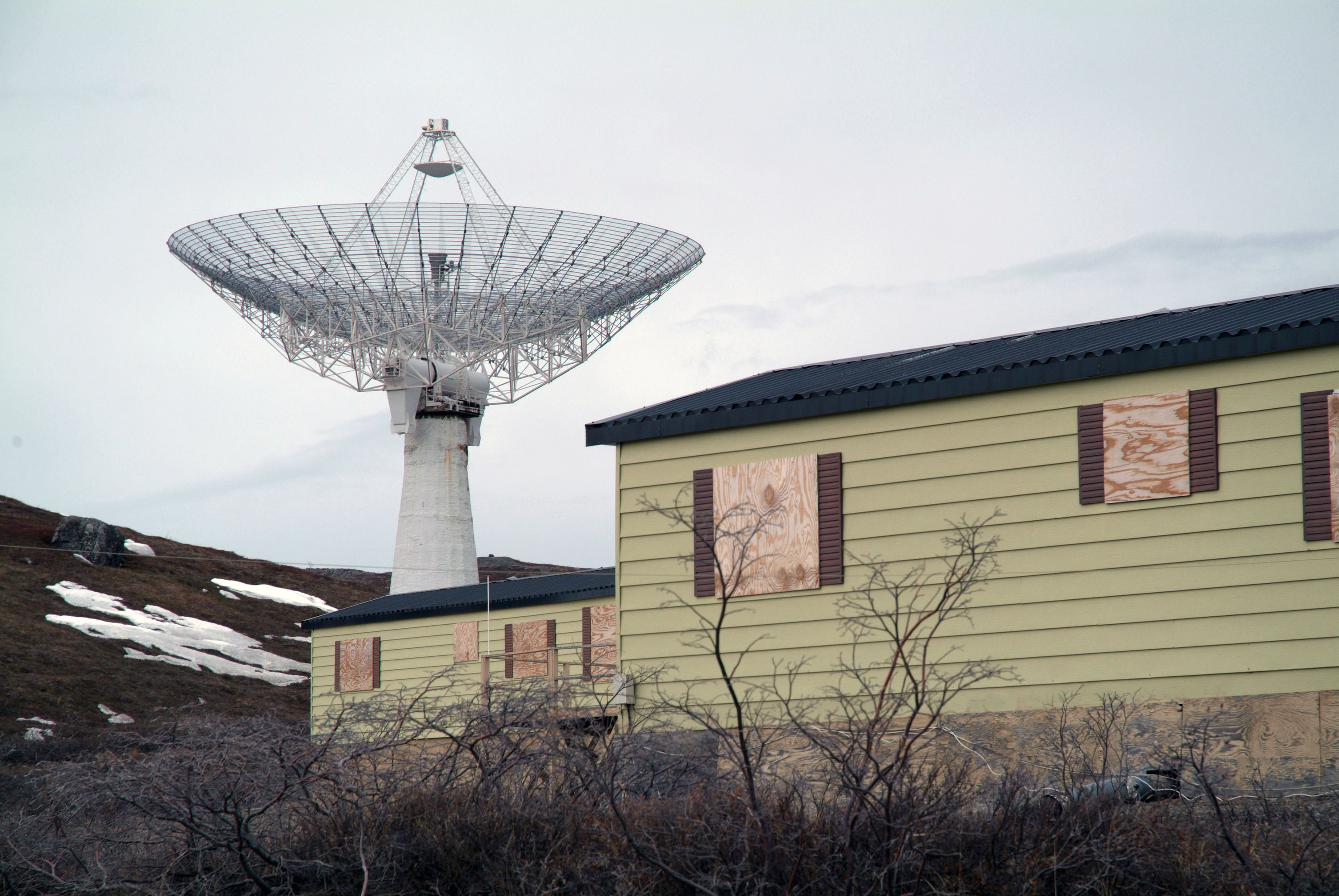
The site of the former Sondrestrom Upper Atmospheric Research Facility.

From 1982 to 2018, an ionospheric and atmospheric research facility known as the Sondrestrom Upper Atmospheric Research Facility was situated at about 15 kilometres (9.3 mi) west of Kangerlussuaq. It was commonly known as Kellyville. It was operated by SRI International for the U.S. National Science Foundation and the Danish Meteorological Institute. The facility was host to more than 20 instruments, the majority of which provide unique and complementary information about the arctic upper atmosphere. The centerpiece instrument of the facility was an L band incoherent scatter (IS) radar with a 32-metre (105 ft) fully steerable antenna. It was transported from Alaska to Kangerlussuaq in 1983. It also hosts one of the SAR/GALILEO Reference and Calibration Beacons that continuously end to end tests the system for the Emergency position-indicating radio beacons of COSPAS-SARSAT.

The station buildings were demolished in 2023, but the dish remains in place. The University of New Brunswick plans to take over the site in 2025 and build a new ionospheric research facility.

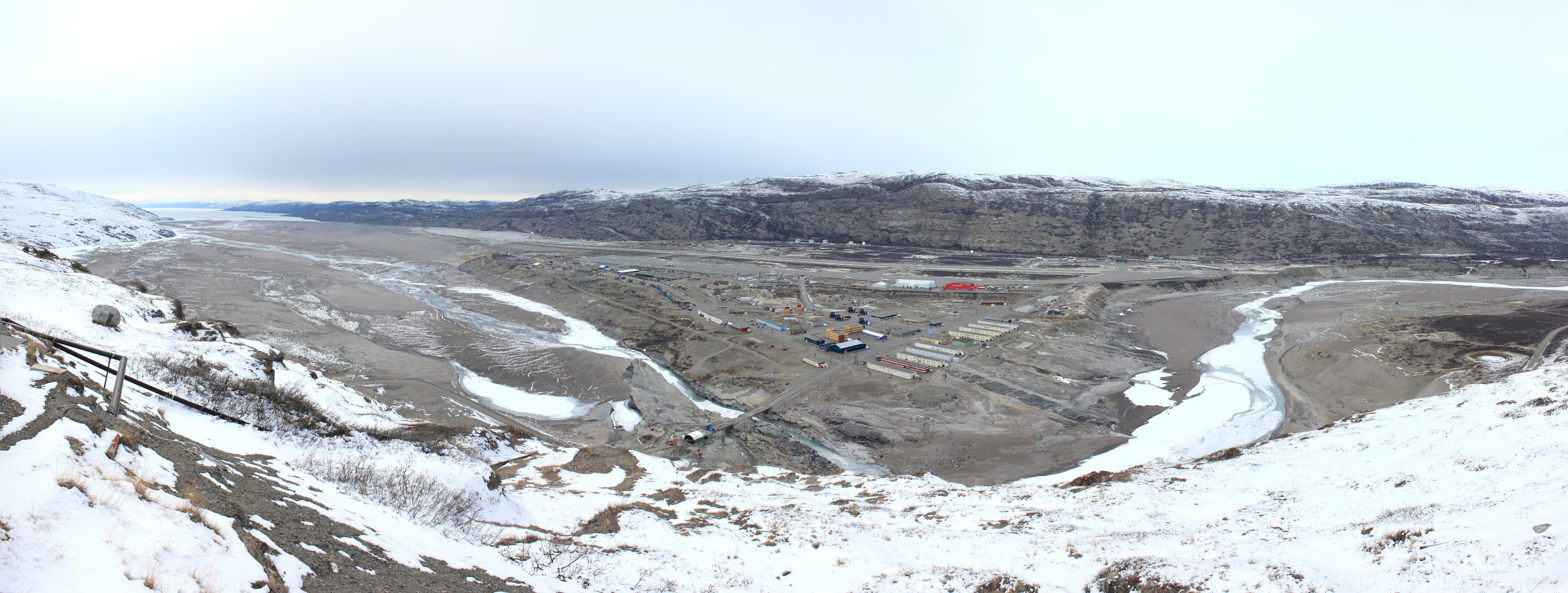
A panorama of Kangerlussuaq taken from Black Ridge, 2013
