= Taseralik Culture Center =

Cultural center in Sisimiut, Greenland

Taseralik
- Taseralik kulturikkut
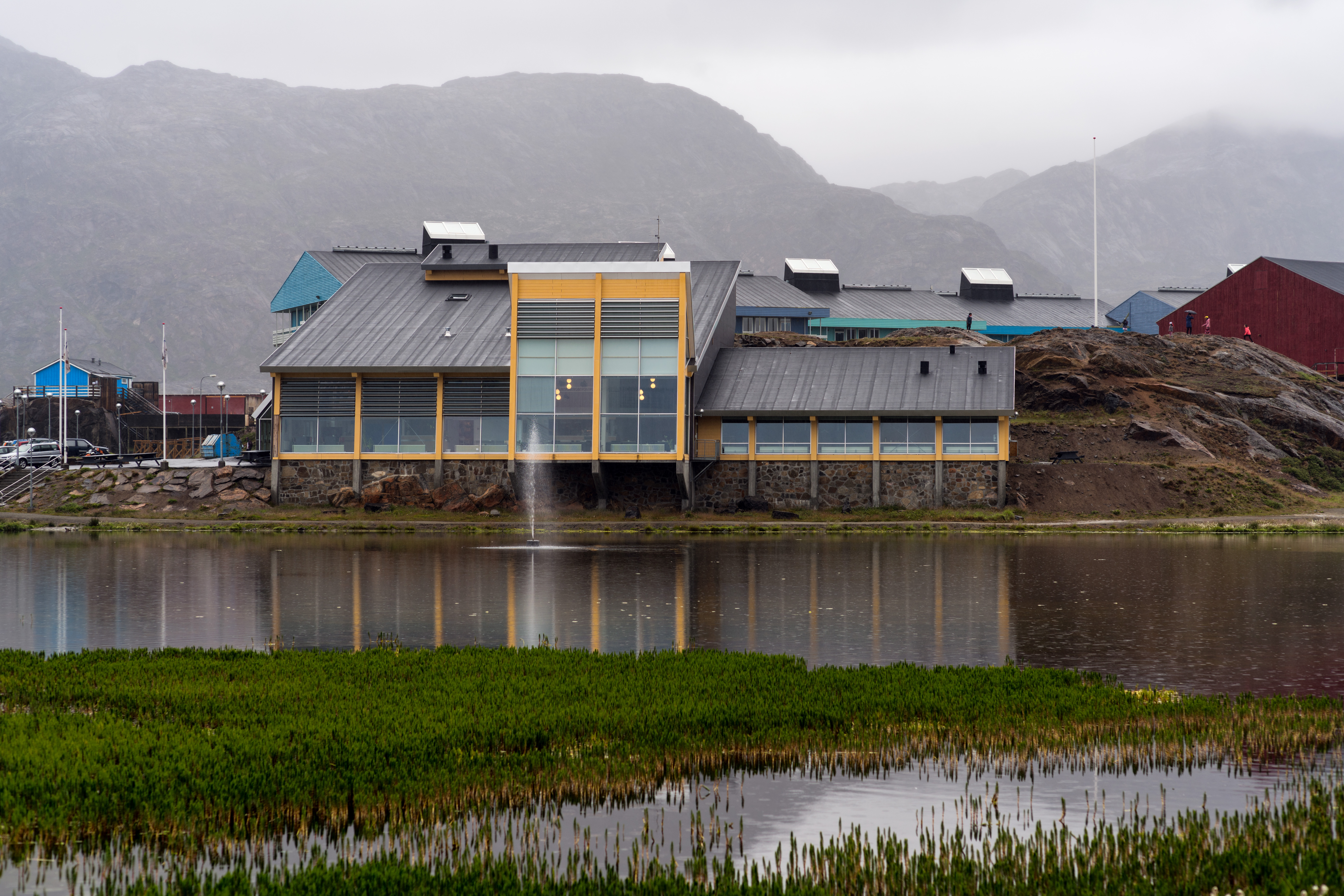
- Taseralik Culture Center overlooking Nalunnguarfik Lake
- Interactive map of the Taseralik area

General information
- Architectural style: Modernism
- Location: Sisimiut, Greenland
- Coordinates: 66°56′15″N 53°39′02″W
- Opened: 1 March 2008

Website
- Official website

Taseralik Culture Center (Greenlandic: Taseralik kulturikkut) is a cultural centre in Sisimiut, a town in western Greenland, the second-largest town in the country. Located in the eastern part of Sisimiut, on the shore of the small Nalunnguarfik lake, Taseralik is the second such centre in Greenland, after Katuaq in Nuuk, the capital. It was opened on 1 March 2008.

== Activity ==
The centre hosts art exhibitions, traveling theatre troupes, movies, and concerts, from classical to folk music. The Sisimiut Culture Day on 21 November is also celebrated at Taseralik.
