= Sisimiut =

City in Greenland

Sisimiut Holsteinsborg
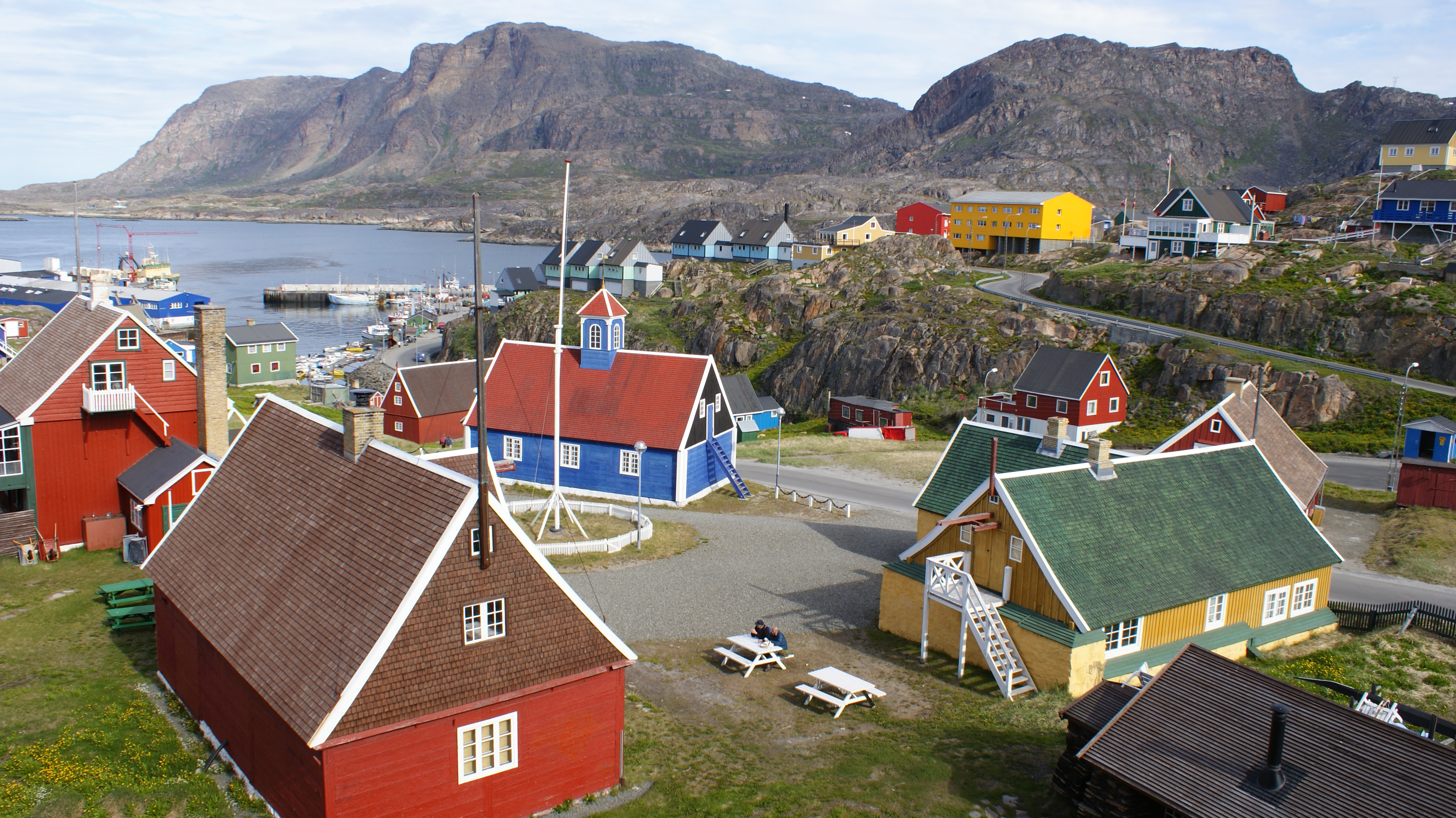
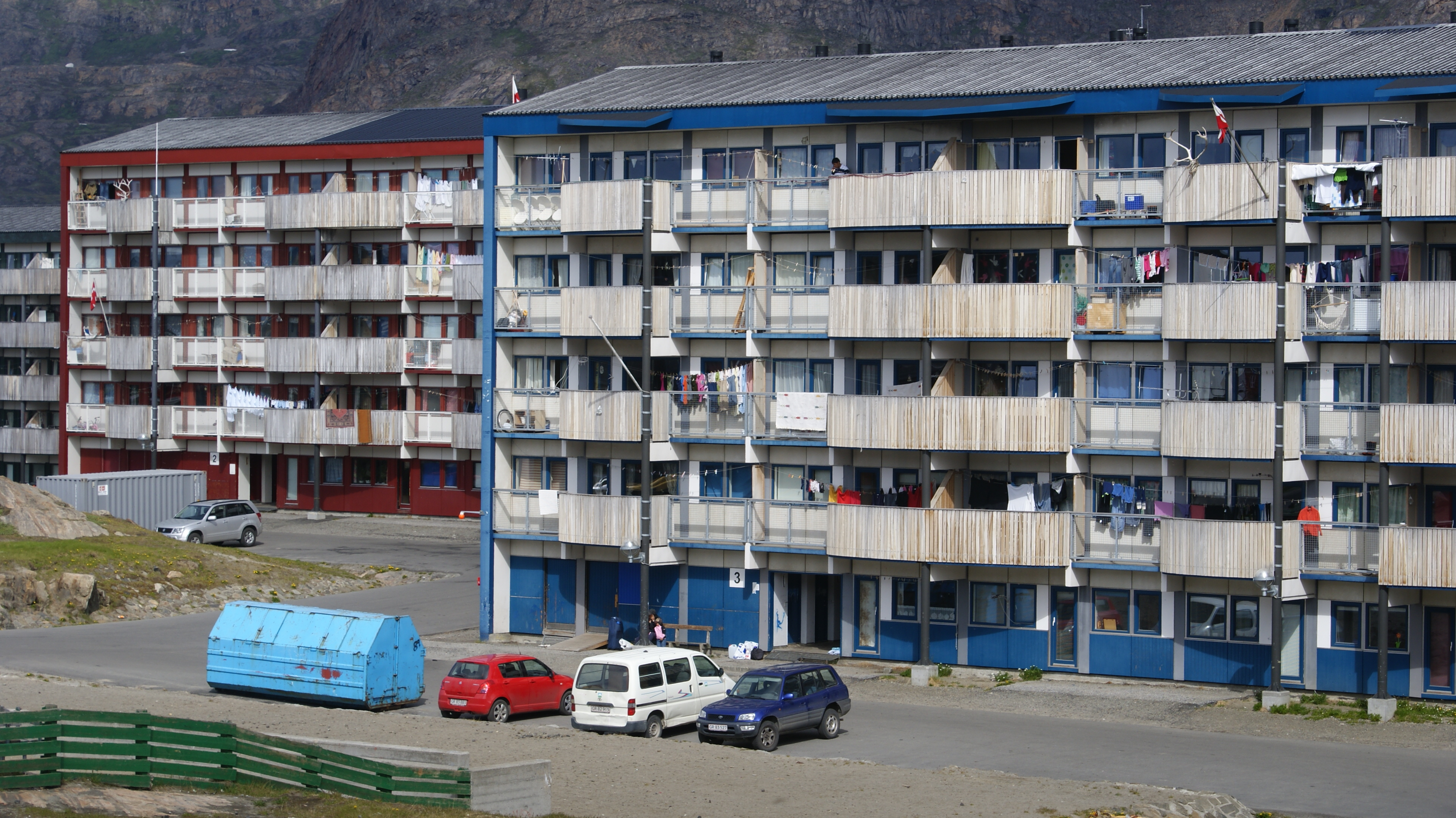
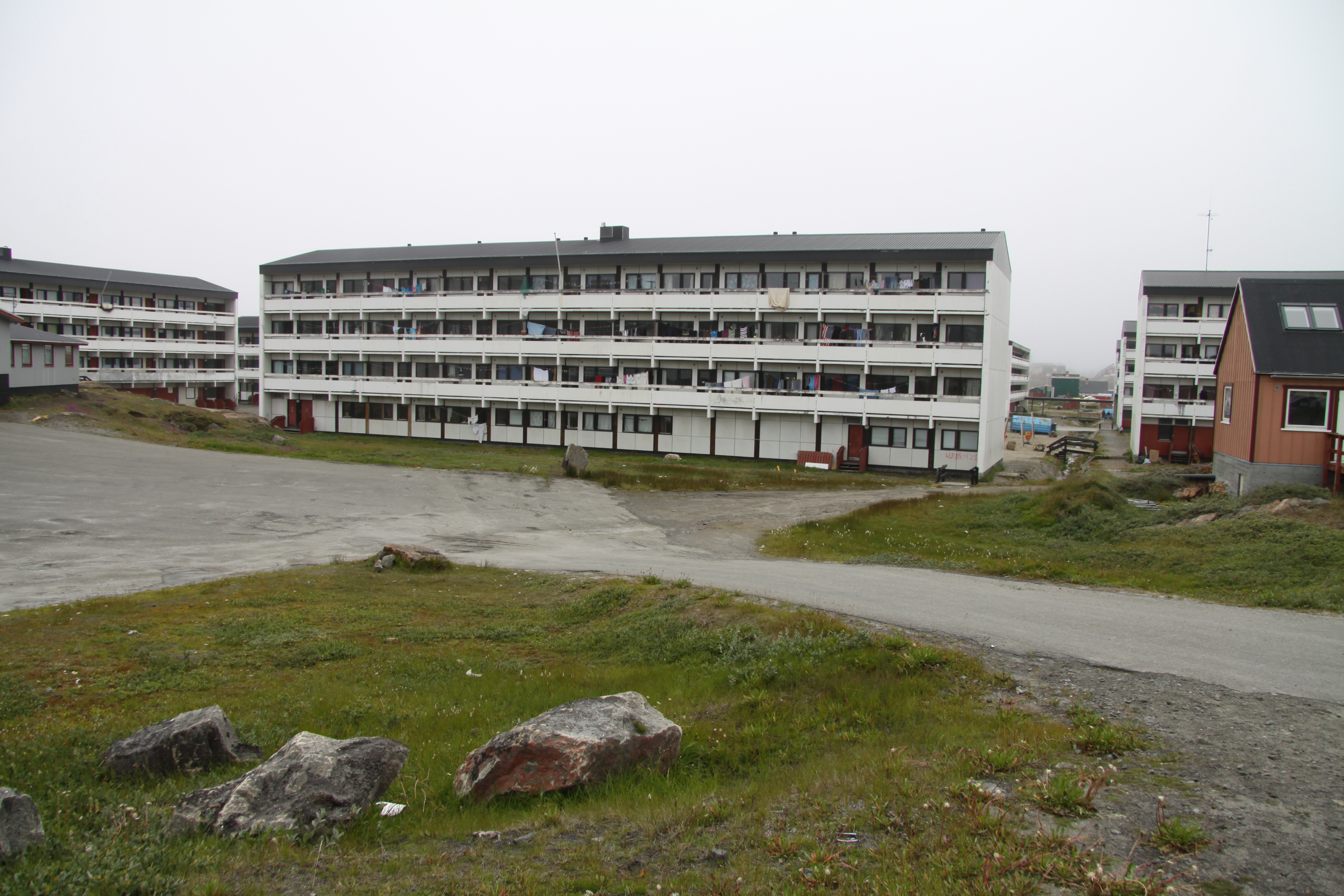
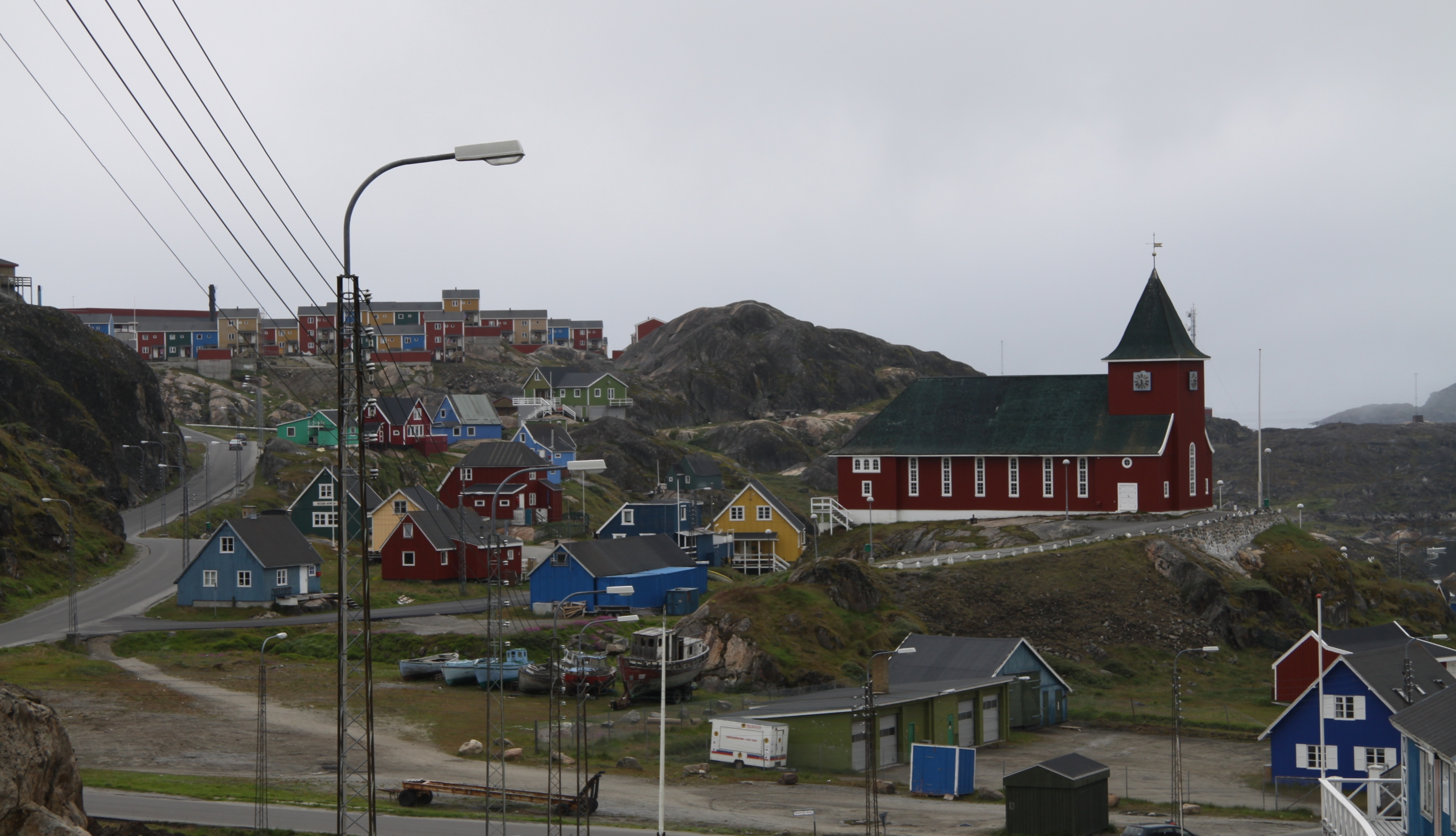
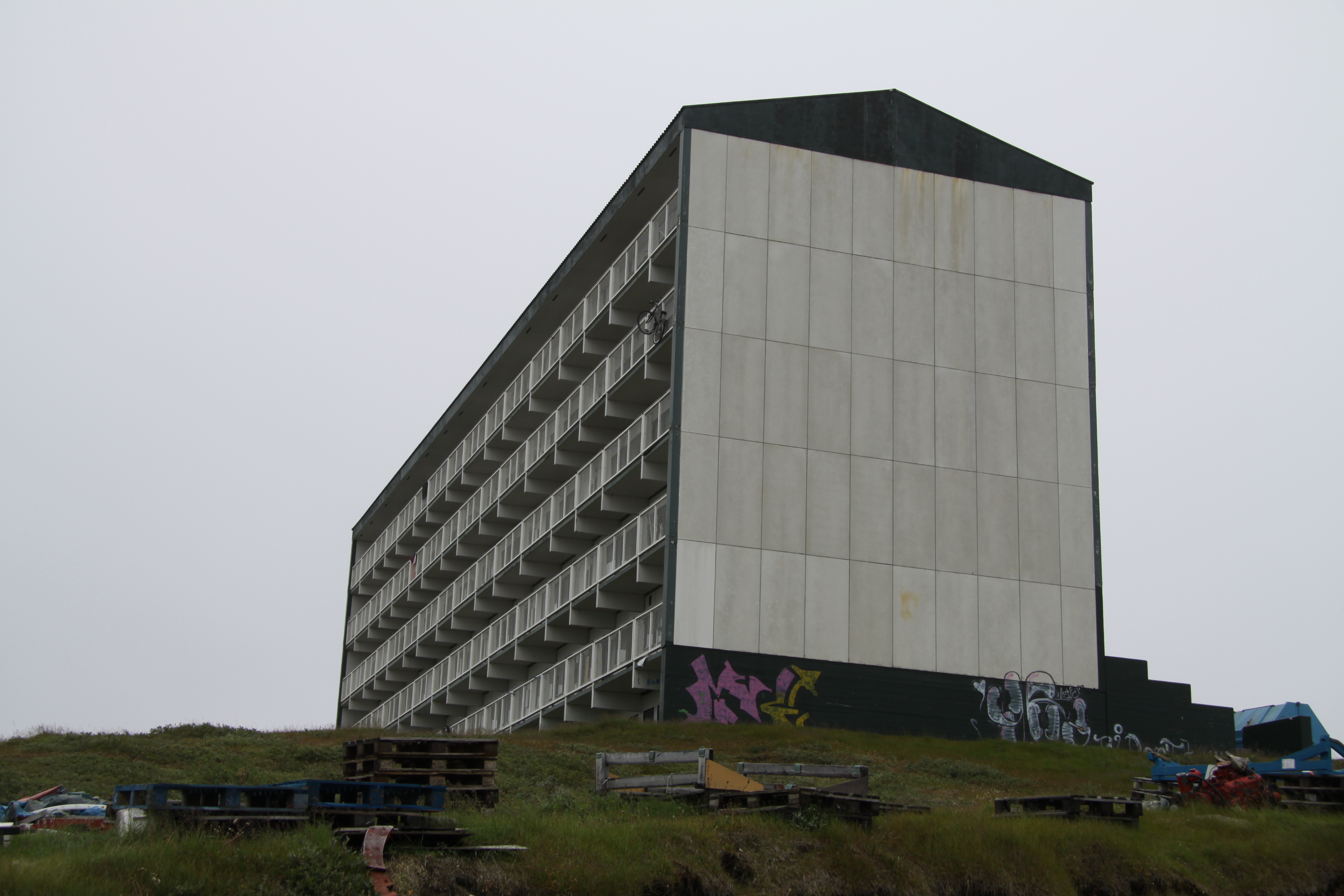
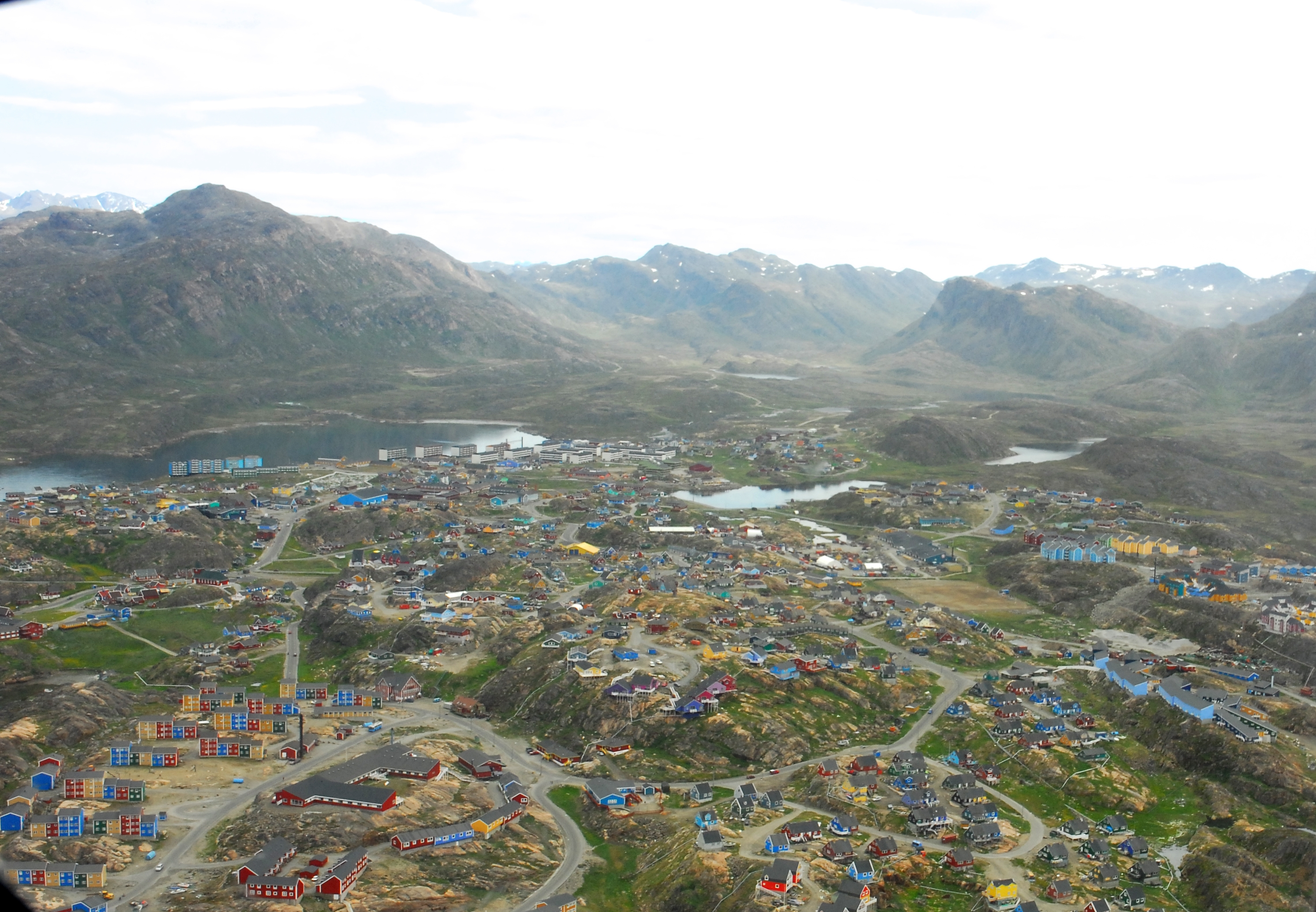
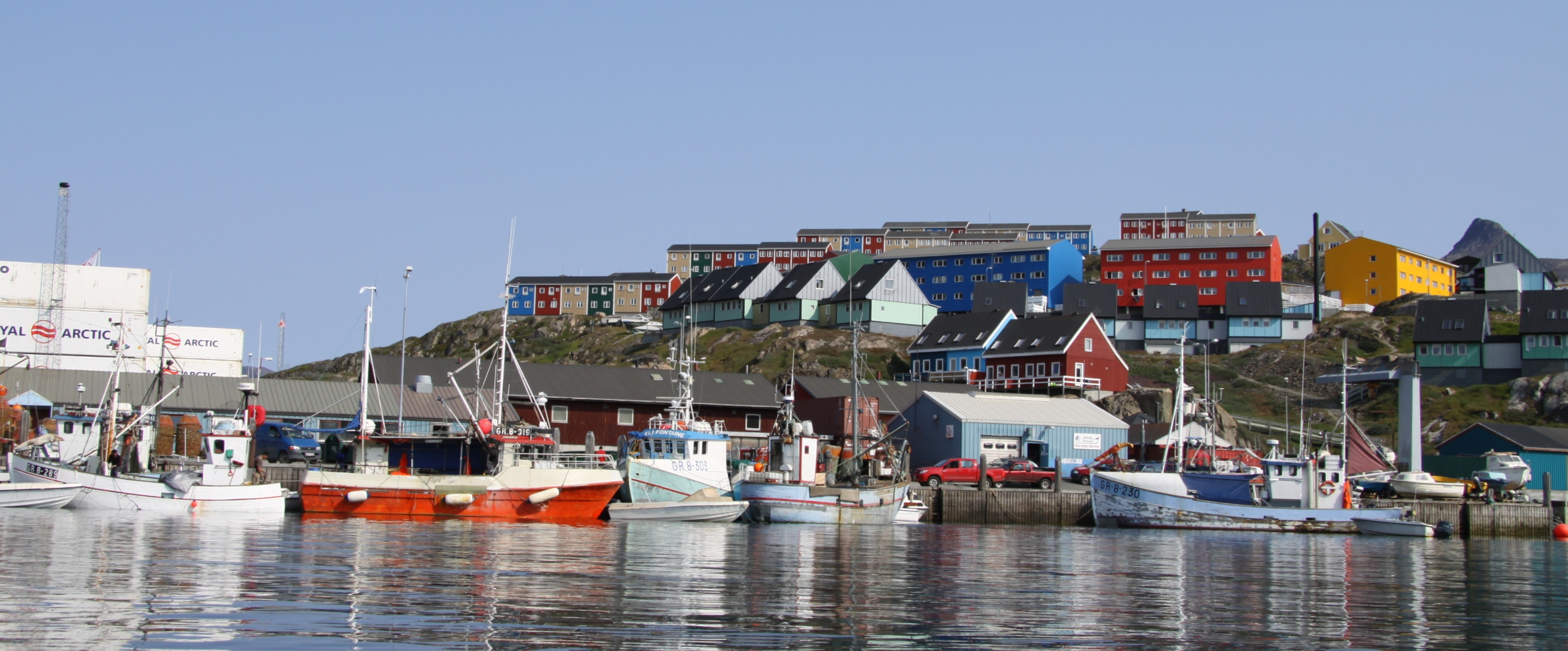
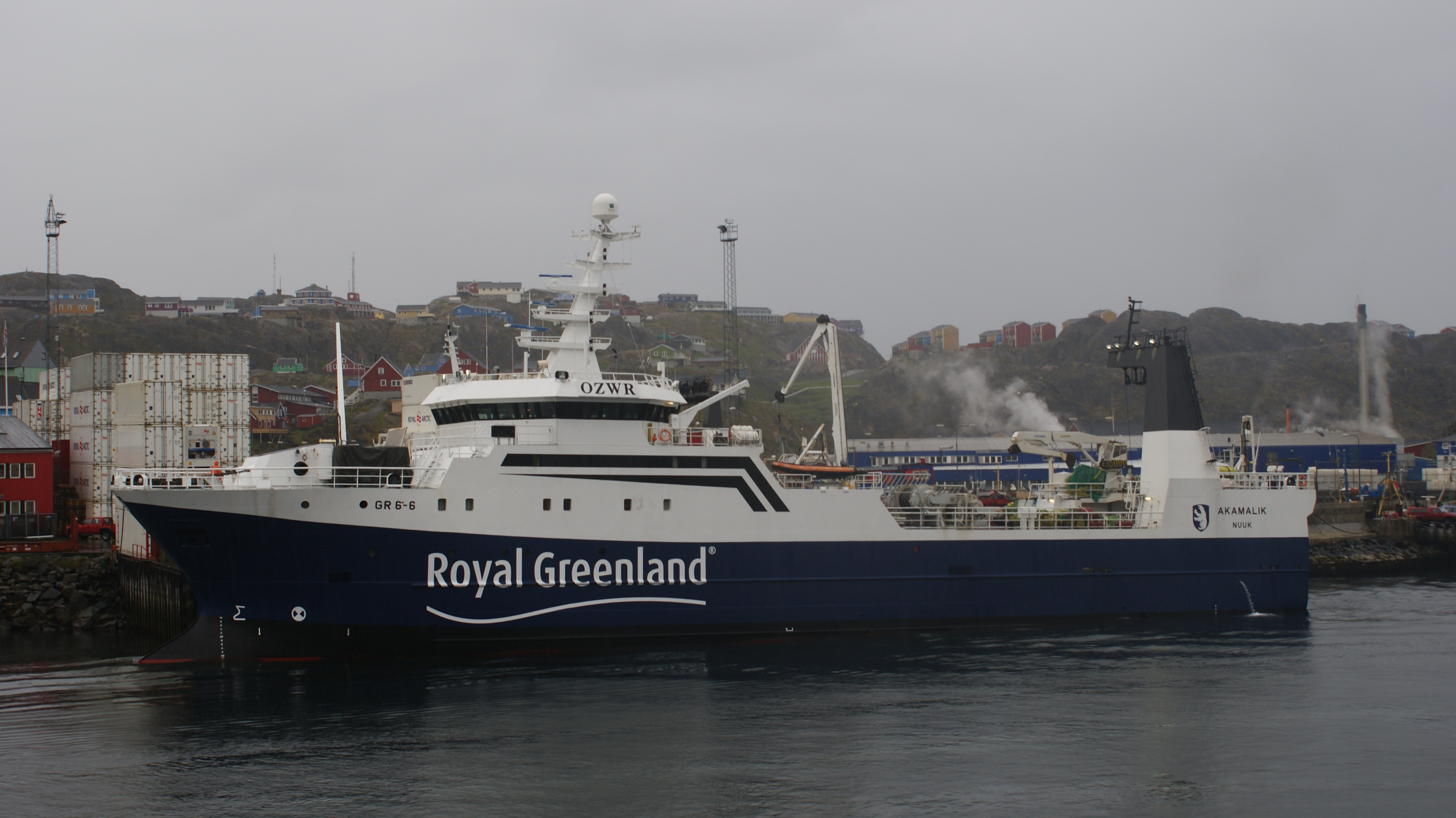
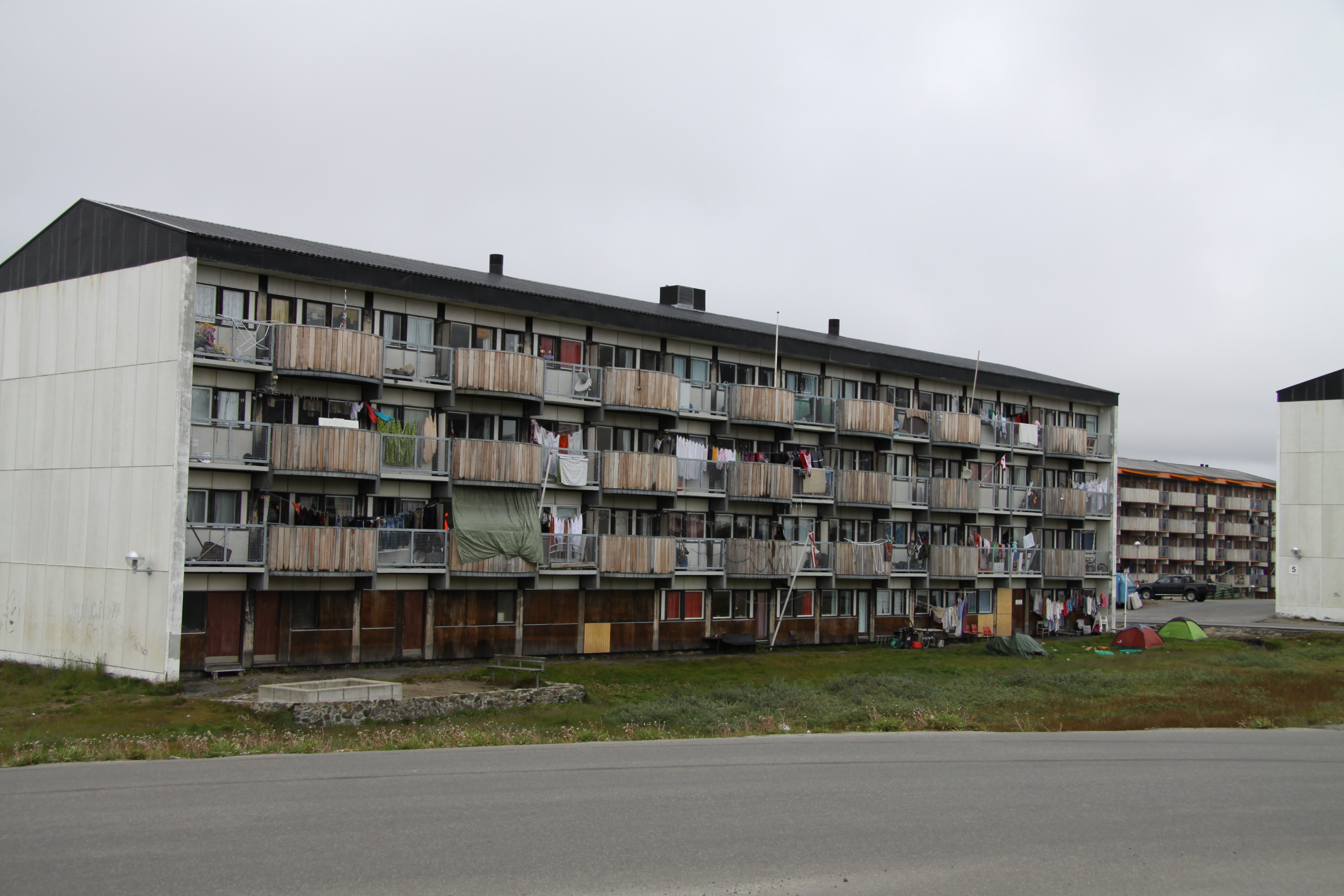
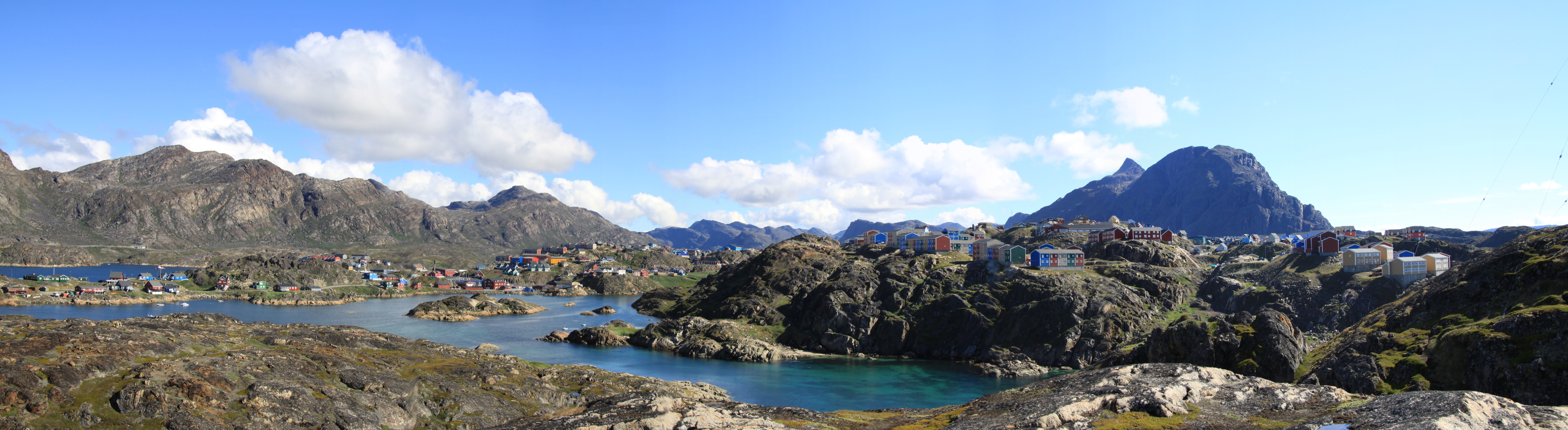
- Town centre, Kangerluarsunnguaq Bay, and the massif of Nasaasaaq
- Interactive map of Sisimiut
- Location within Greenland
- Coordinates: 66°56′20″N 53°40′20″W
- Sovereign state: Kingdom of Denmark
- Autonomous territory: Greenland
- Municipality: Qeqqata
- First settled: 2500 BCE
- Founded: 1764

Government
  - Mayor: Malik Berthelsen (Siumut)

Population (2025)
  - Total: 5,526
  - Rank: 2nd in Greenland
- Time zone: UTC−02:00 (Western Greenland Time)
  - Summer (DST): UTC−01:00 (Western Greenland Summer Time)
- Postal code: 3911
- Website: qeqqata.gl

Sisimiut (Greenlandic: [sisimiut]), also known by its Danish name Holsteinsborg, is the capital and largest city of the Qeqqata municipality, and the second-largest city in Greenland. (Note: The term 'city' is loosely used to describe any populated area in Greenland, given that the most populated place is Nuuk, the capital, with 20,085 inhabitants. The term 'Arctic' is interpreted as strictly the area within the Arctic Circle.) It is located in central-western Greenland, on the coast of Davis Strait, approximately 320 km (200 mi) north of Nuuk.

Sisimiut literally means "the residents at the foxholes" (Danish: Beboerne ved rævehulerne). The site has been inhabited for the last 4,500 years, first by peoples of the Saqqaq culture, then Dorset culture, and then the Thule people, whose Inuit descendants form the majority of the current population. Artifacts from the early settlement era can be found throughout the region, favored in the past for its plentiful fauna, particularly the marine mammals providing subsistence for the early hunting societies. The population of modern Greenlanders in Sisimiut is a mix of the Inuit and Danish peoples, who first settled in the area in the 1720s, under the leadership of the Danish missionary, Hans Egede.

Today, Sisimiut is the largest business centre north of the national capital of Nuuk and is one of the fastest growing cities in Greenland. Fishing is the principal industry in Sisimiut, although the town has a growing industrial base. KNI and its subsidiary Pilersuisoq, a state-owned chain of all-purpose general stores in Greenland, have their base in Sisimiut. Architecturally, Sisimiut is a mix of traditional, single-family houses, and communal housing, with apartment blocks raised in the 1960s during a period of town expansion in Greenland. Sisimiut is still expanding, with the area north of the port, on the shore of the small Kangerluarsunnguaq Bay reserved for a modern suburb-style housing slated for construction in the 2010s. Several professional and general schools are based in Sisimiut, providing education to the inhabitants of the city and to those from smaller settlements in the region. The new Taseralik Culture Centre is the second cultural centre to be established in Greenland, after Katuaq in Nuuk.

The city has its own bus line, and is the northernmost year-round ice-free port in the country, a shipping base for western and northwestern Greenland. Supply ships head from the commercial port towards smaller settlements in more remote regions of Uummannaq Fjord, Upernavik Archipelago, and as far as Qaanaaq in northern Greenland. Sisimiut Airport, the town airport is served by Air Greenland, providing connections to other towns on the western coast of Greenland, and through Nuuk Airport, to Europe.

== History ==
=== Prehistory ===
==== Saqqaq culture ====
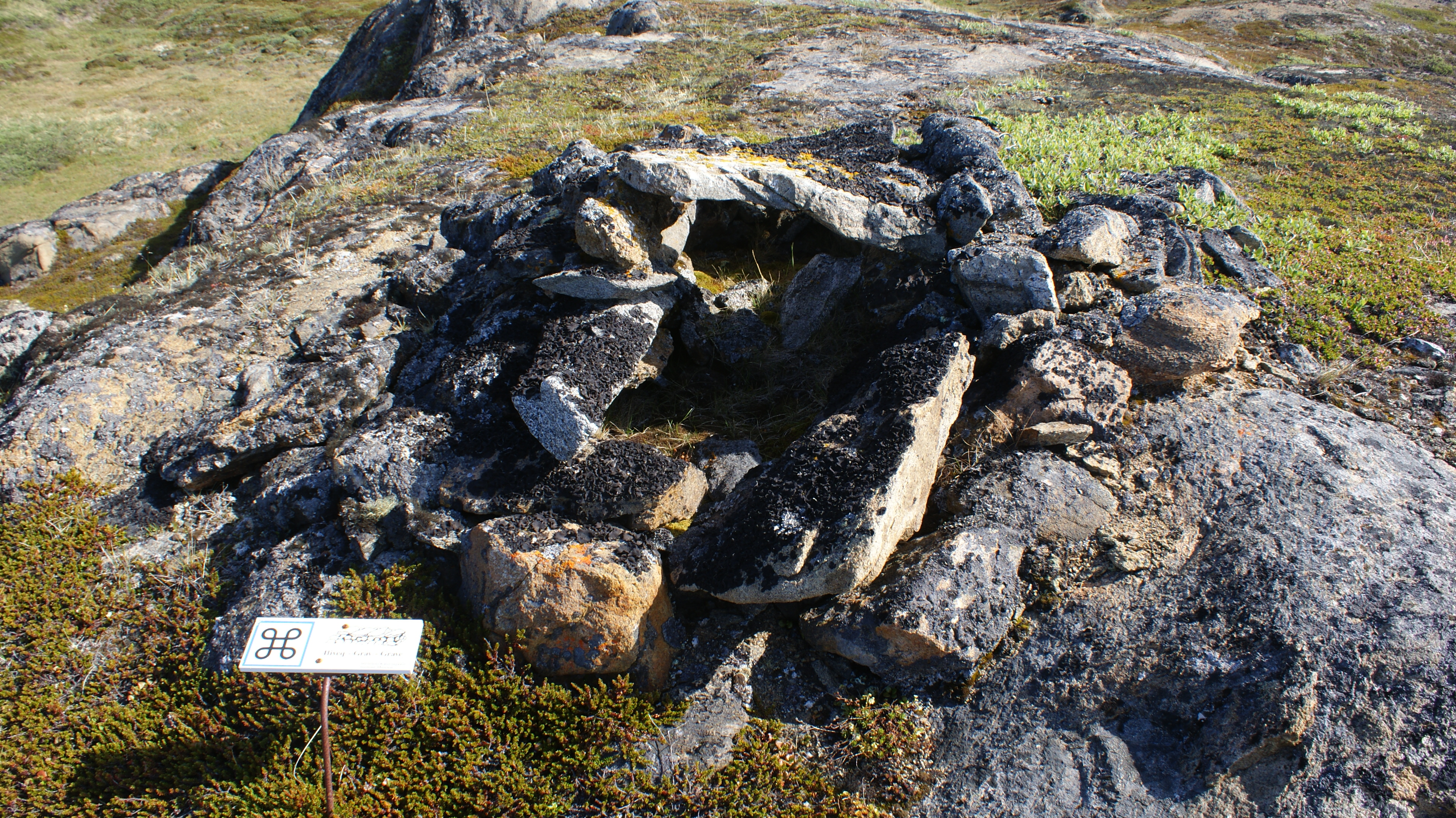
Iliveq, a prehistoric Inuit stone grave near Sisimiut Airport. It is located on a hill above the airport built at the current sea level, near the small sand dunes of what used to have been the shoreline

Sisimiut has been a settlement site for around 4,500 years, with the people of the Saqqaq culture arriving from Arctic Canada during the first wave of immigration, occupying numerous sites on the coast of western Greenland. At that time, the shoreline was up to several dozen meters above the present line, gradually decreasing in time due to post-glacial rebound. The Saqqaq remained in western Greenland for nearly two millennia. Unlike the following waves of migrants in the millennium following their disappearance, the Saqqaq left behind a substantial number of artifacts, with plentiful archeological finds on the coast of Davis Strait, from Disko Bay (Greenlandic: Qeqertarsuup Tunua) in the north—to the coast of Labrador Sea near Nuuk in the south.

Research has uncovered the changing settlement pattern, exhibiting transition from the single-family dwellings to tiny villages of several families. The types of dwelling varied from tent rings made of the hides of hunted mammals, to stone hearths, with no evidence of communal living in larger structures. In contrast, there is evidence for reindeer hunting as a coordinated effort of either villagers or groups of more loosely related individuals, with gathering places in proximity of the hunting grounds being found. Despite recent advances in DNA research based on hair samples from the ancient Saqqaq migrants (which gives insight into their origin), the reason for the decline and subsequent disappearance of the culture are not yet known.

==== Dorset culture ====
After several hundred years of no permanent habitation, the second wave of migration arrived from Canada, bringing the Dorset people to western Greenland. The first wave of immigrants, known as Dorset I, arrived around 500 BCE, inhabiting the region for the next 700 years. The early Dorset people were followed later by the Dorset II people; however, no artifacts have been discovered from the later era around Sisimiut, and few artifacts from the era of Dorset I have been uncovered in archaeological sites, with the finds often limited to harpoon heads and numerous animal bones. The largest number of Dorset culture artifacts can be found farther north in the Disko Bay region; there are poorer finds farther to the south, disappearing completely on the coast of Labrador Sea in southwestern Greenland.

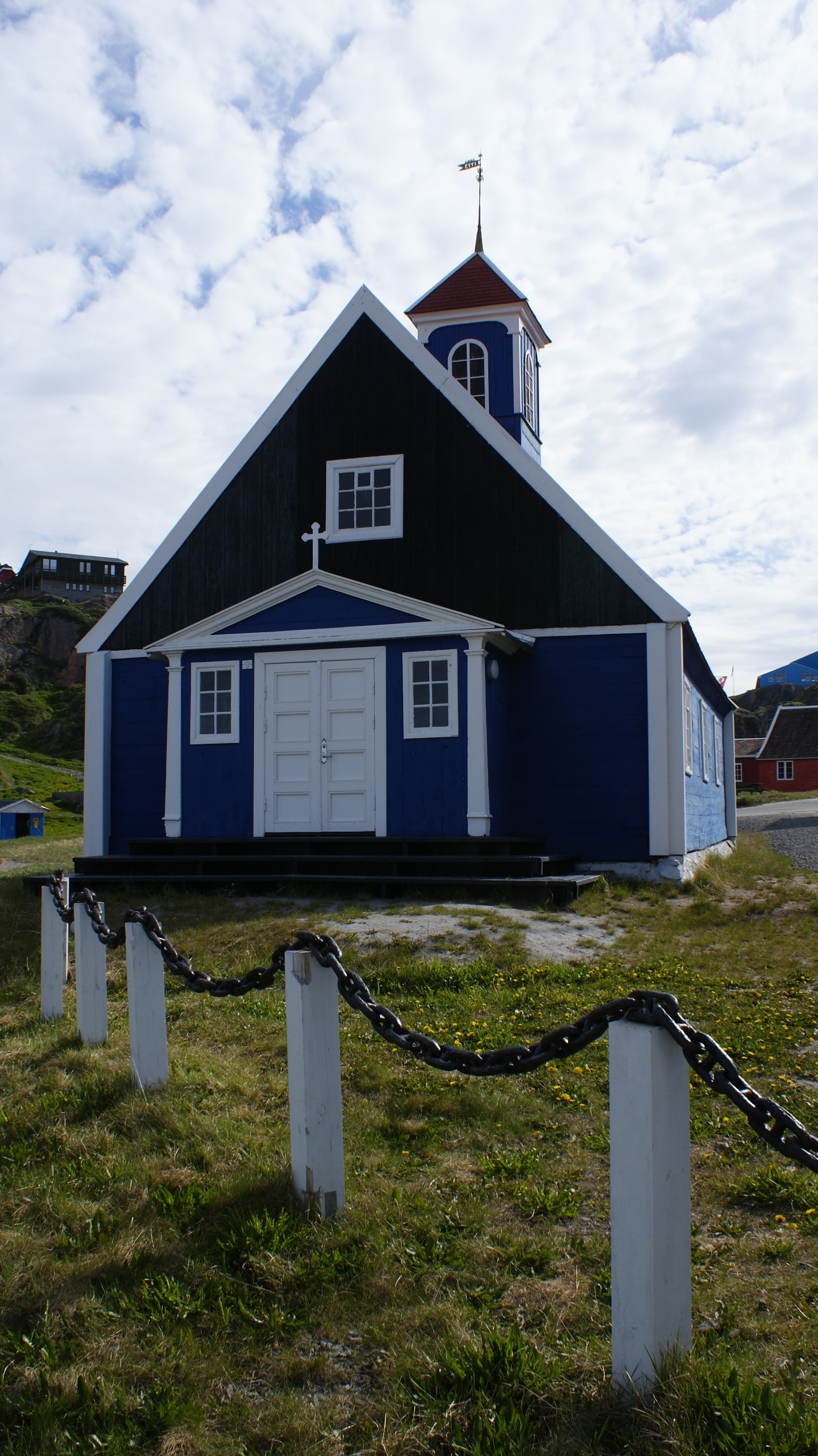
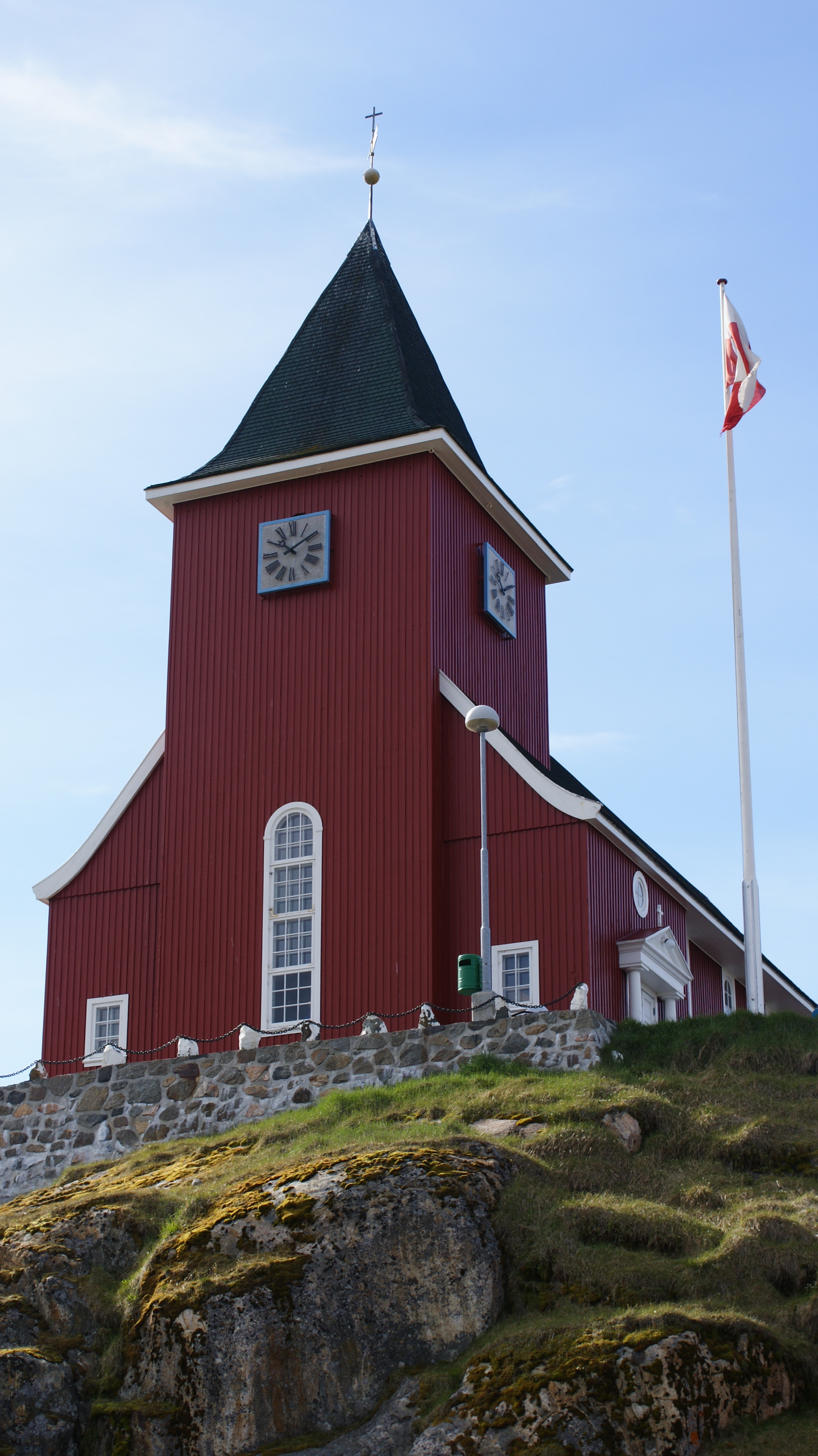
The churches in the Sisimiut centre—the old and the new—are immediate neighbors, with one overlooking the other. Left: Bethel Church (1775). Right: New church (1926)

=== Thule people ===
The shoreline was still at a higher altitude than today, with the Sisimiut valley east of the Kangerluarsunnguaq Bay, partially under sea. Many Thule artifacts and graves from the several centuries of permanent settlement remain scattered in the region. Rich in fauna, the coastal region from Sisimiut to Kangaamiut was particularly attractive for migrants, and due to a large number of historical artifacts it is currently listed as a candidate for the UNESCO World Heritage Site, with the application received in 2003.

=== Colonial era ===
There are no signs of Norse settlement in the region. At the time of Hans Egede's establishment of the first Danish colonies, Dutch whalers dominated the area and swiftly burnt down his Bergen Company whaling station on Nipisat Island, approximately 30 km (19 mi) to the north of the present-day town. It was not until Jacob Severin was granted a full monopoly on the Greenlandic trade and permitted to act as an agent of the Danish navy that the Dutch were finally removed in a series of battles in 1738 and 1739.

The present town was established in 1764 by the General Trade Company as the trading post of Holsteinsborg ("Fort Holstein"), named for the first chairman of the Danish College of Missions in Copenhagen which underwrote and directed the missionary work in the colony. At the time of its founding, the Kalaallisut name of the place was Amerlok, after its fjord. Under the Royal Greenland Trading Department, Holsteinsborg was a centre of the trade in reindeer skins.

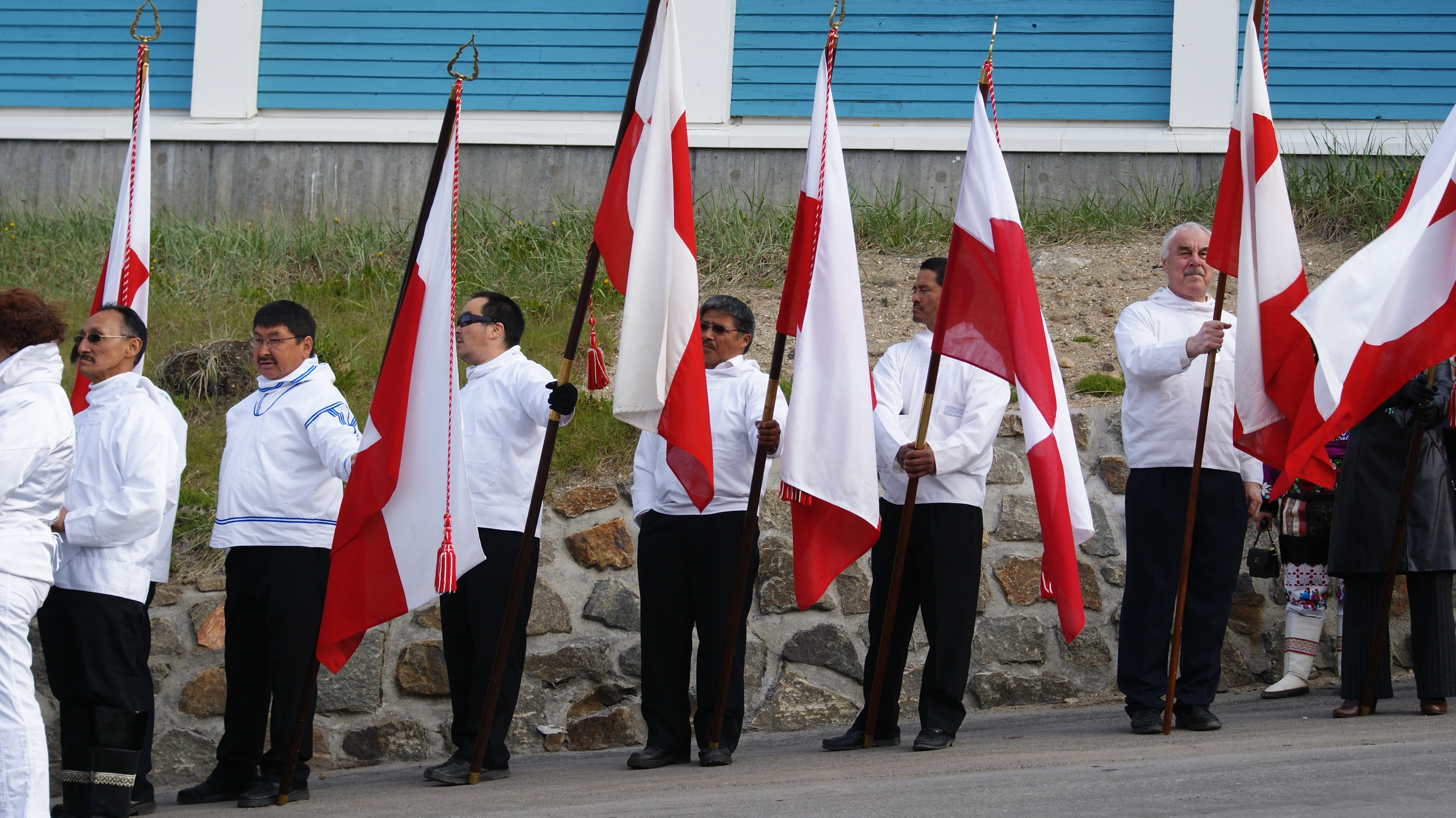
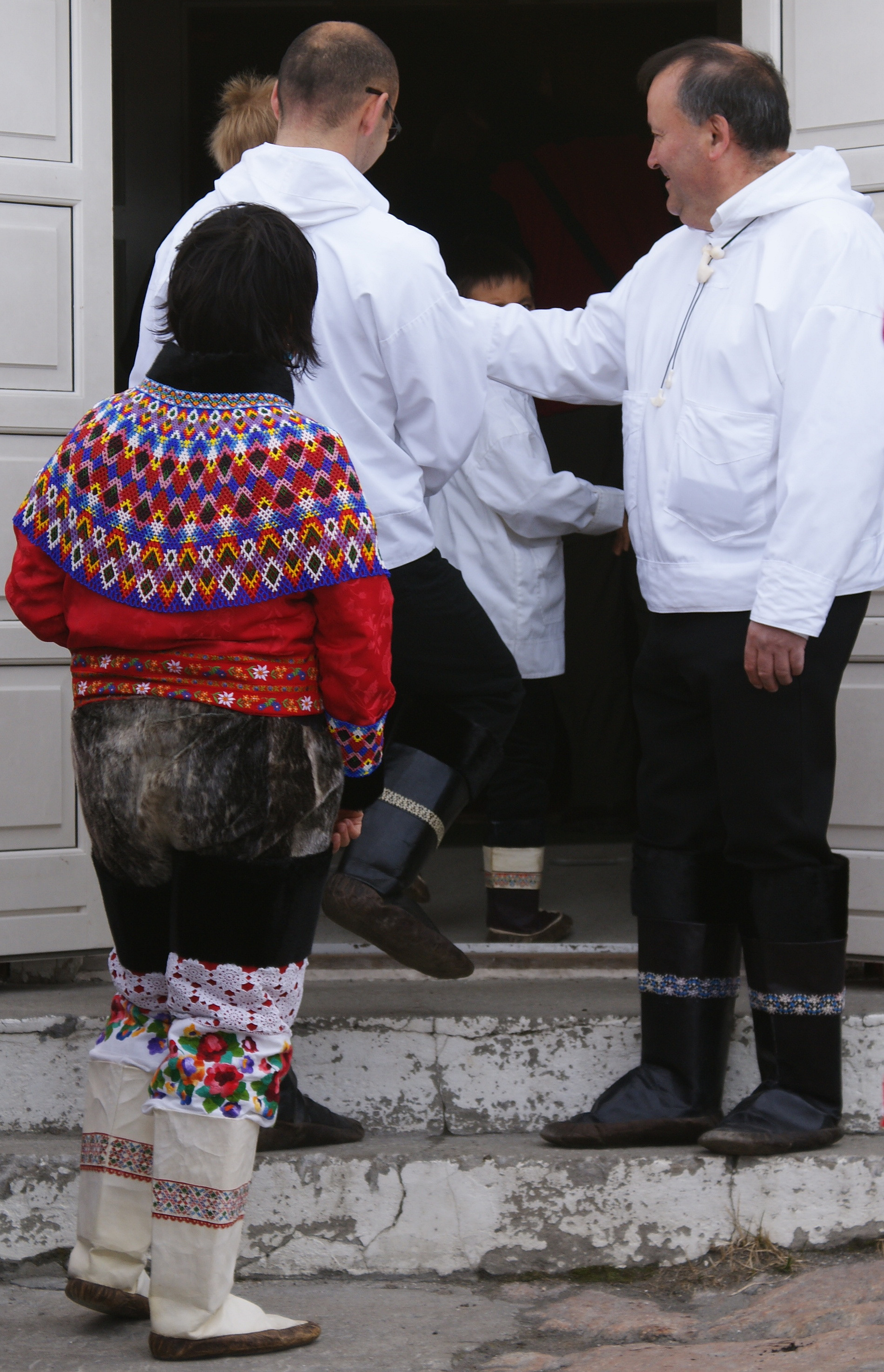
Left: Greenland's National Day celebrations on 21 June 2010, the first anniversary of the establishment of Self Rule in 2009, after the 2008 referendum. Right: Dressed in national ceremonial costumes, the townspeople are personally welcomed to the church by Mayor Hermann Berthelsen on the same day

Several 18th-century buildings still stand in Sisimiut, among them the 1725 Gammelhuset ("Old House") and the 1775 Bethel-kirken ("Bethel Church") or Blå Kirke ("Blue Church"), the oldest surviving church in Greenland. The buildings were moved from the former site of the settlement at Ukiivik (Holsteinsborg) together with the rest of the settlement. The new church on the rocky pedestal was built in 1926, further extended in 1984. The entrance to the yard with the old church and other protected historical buildings is decorated with a unique gate made of whale jawbone.

=== 20th and 21st centuries ===
The 20th century saw industrialization, through the construction of a shipping port, and a fish processing factory of Royal Greenland in 1924, the first such factory in Greenland. Fishing remains the primary occupation of Sisimiut inhabitants, with the town becoming the leading centre of shrimping and shrimp processing. Until 2008 Sisimiut had been the administrative centre of Sisimiut Municipality, which was then incorporated into the new Qeqqata Municipality on 1 January 2009, with Sisimiut retaining its status as the administrative centre of the new unit, consisting also of the former Maniitsoq Municipality and the previously unincorporated area of Kangerlussuaq. The municipal council, seated in the town hall and headed by Mayor Hermann Berthelsen, consists of 13 members, including the mayor and his deputies, and representatives of the four primary political parties of Greenland: Siumut, Atassut, Democrats and Inuit Ataqatigiit.

== Geography ==
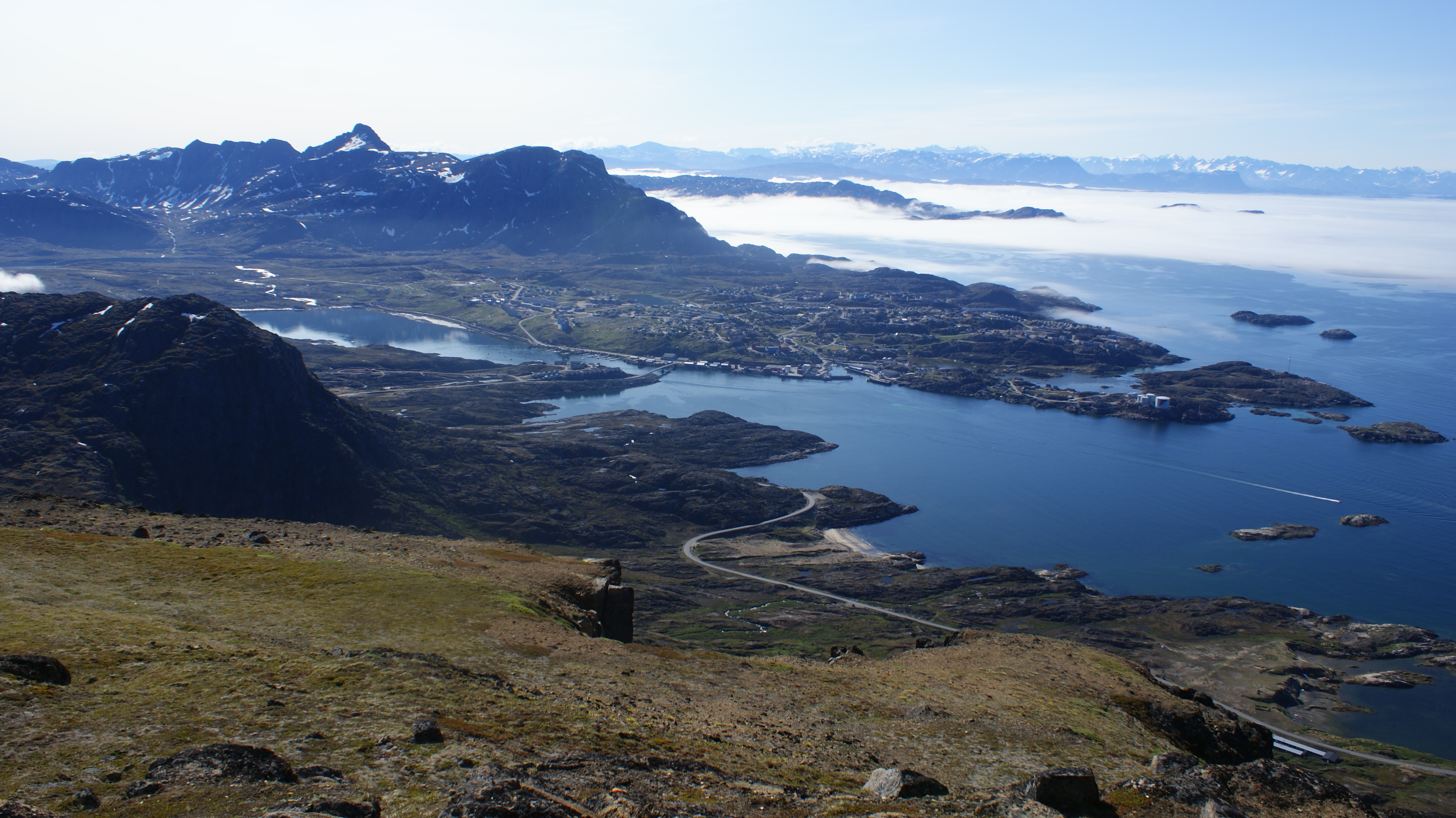
The road to Sisimiut Airport, Sisimiut, Kangerluarsunnguaq Bay, Nasaasaaq, and Amerloq Fjord seen from Palasip Qaqqaa

Sisimiut is located approximately 320 km (200 mi) north of Nuuk, and 75 km (47 mi) north of the Arctic Circle, on the eastern shores of Davis Strait, perched on a series of rocky outcrops at the western end of a large peninsula bounded from the north by the Kangerluarsuk Tulleq fjord and from the south by the wide Amerloq Fjord.

=== Kangerluarsunnguaq Bay ===
Immediately to the north of Sisimiut a small inlet of Davis Strait, the Kangerluarsunnguaq Bay (Danish: Ulkebugten), separates the town from the Palasip Qaqqaa massif in the north, at the southern foot of which the town airport is located. The 544 m (1,785 ft) high twin summit commands a wide view in all directions, with the majority of the coast of the Qeqqata municipality visible in good conditions.

The bay is navigable in its entirety, protected from the open sea by a series of skerries in the west. Both the local port and the local sailing harbor are located on the southern shore of the bay. The 2.2 NM (4.1 km; 2.5 mi) road to the airport passes through the bridge over the Kangerluarsunnguaq Bay. Halfway between the town and the airport there is a small beach of dark sand. The beach, as well as the skerries off the coast, are very popular in the summer.

=== Alanngorsuaq ===
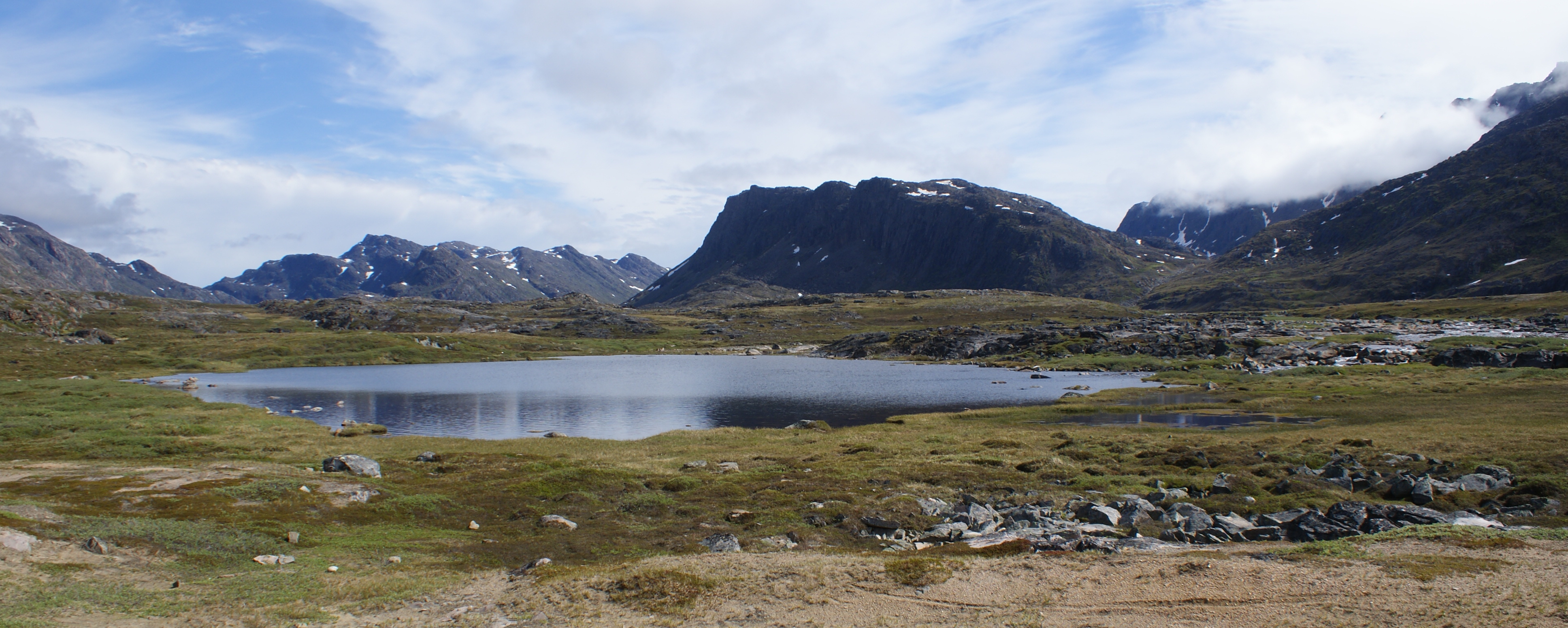
Sisimiut valley and the lakes under Alanngorsuaq are the primary recreation areas for the people of Sisimiut

To the east, a wide valley extends into the interior of the peninsula, bounded from the north by the conjoint massif of Palasip Qaqqaa and Majoriaq, dissected by the Qerrortusup Majoriaa valley alongside which leads the Polar Route from Sisimiut to Kangerlussuaq. Depending on variants, the route is between 150 km (93 mi) and 170 km (110 mi) long.

=== Nasaasaaq ===
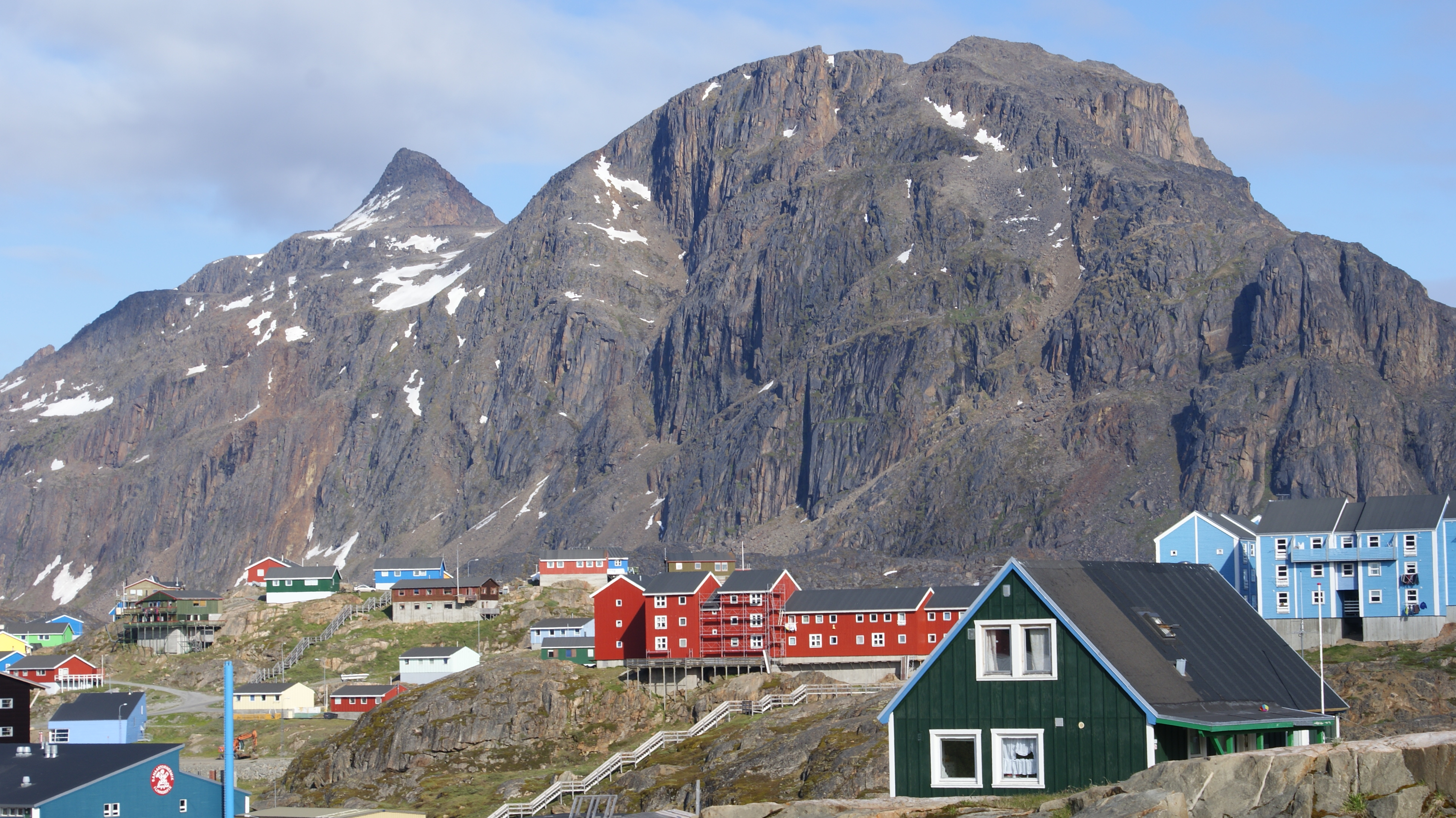
Nasaasaaq (784 m (2,572 ft)) is the highest mountain in the vicinity of Sisimiut, towering over the town from the southeast

To the southeast, the valley is bounded by the Nasaasaaq massif with several distinct summits, the highest of which is 784 m (2,572 ft). The Nasaasaaq ridge has several summits. The main summit is the most prominent, rising over the remainder of the ridge in a tall 150 m (490 ft) cone at 784 m (2,572 ft). The ridge terminates in a 611 m (2,005 ft) trabant overlooking Sisimiut. To the east the ridge gradually falls to nearly 300 m (980 ft), before turning east-north-east towards the Aappilattorsuaq massif. The southern wall of Nasaasaaq falls directly to Amerloq Fjord. The northern wall is not a uniform surface, dissected by ledges, dihedrals, and ramps.

The main access route to the summit leads through one of the ramps to the saddle between the main summit and its western trabant. The passage on the top cone is secured by ropes for unprepared tourists. One of the variants of the Polar Route follows the coast of Amerloq Fjord at the base of the southern wall of Nasaasaaq. The main summit is visited for its long-range view of the coast, although more limited to the north than that of Palasip Qaqqaa to the north of the town airport. An alternative route to the top of interest to mountaineers leads through the hard to find low pass to the east of the main summit, and from there directly on the summit cone ridge.

=== Climate ===
Sisimiut has a polar tundra climate (Köppen climate classification ET). The average high temperature is 10 °C (50 °F) or lower throughout the year. The coldest months on average are February and March which have average highs of −10.2 °C (13.6 °F) and −10.1 °C (13.8 °F) respectively. The warmest months are July and August which have average highs of 9.8 °C (49.6 °F) and 9.3 °C (48.7 °F) respectively and are the only months of the year in which the average lows are above 1 °C (34 °F), both at 3.3 °C (37.9 °F). Precipitation is very low in Sisimiut, with the greatest amount of rainfall occurring in the second half of the year, between July and December, with August and September being the wettest months. The sea winds from Davis Strait moderate the climate, with the area known for its fogs. Sisimiut has midnight sun from 3 June to 9 July, but there is no true polar night in winter time.

Climate data for Sisimiut (1991–2020 normals, extremes 1961–2020)
Month	Jan	Feb	Mar	Apr	May	Jun	Jul	Aug	Sep	Oct	Nov	Dec	Year
Record high °C (°F)	12.5 (54.5)	12.0 (53.6)	14.7 (58.5)	13.3 (55.9)	20.4 (68.7)	21.9 (71.4)	23.5 (74.3)	23.8 (74.8)	20.0 (68.0)	18.4 (65.1)	16.3 (61.3)	11.5 (52.7)	23.8 (74.8)
Mean daily maximum °C (°F)	−8.4 (16.9)	−10.3 (13.5)	−8.4 (16.9)	−2.0 (28.4)	4.0 (39.2)	9.0 (48.2)	11.6 (52.9)	10.7 (51.3)	6.8 (44.2)	2.0 (35.6)	−2.3 (27.9)	−5.2 (22.6)	0.6 (33.1)
Daily mean °C (°F)	−11.5 (11.3)	−13.7 (7.3)	−12.0 (10.4)	−5.5 (22.1)	0.7 (33.3)	5.1 (41.2)	7.6 (45.7)	7.3 (45.1)	4.1 (39.4)	−0.7 (30.7)	−5.0 (23.0)	−8.0 (17.6)	−2.6 (27.3)
Mean daily minimum °C (°F)	−14.5 (5.9)	−17.0 (1.4)	−15.5 (4.1)	−8.9 (16.0)	−2.2 (28.0)	1.9 (35.4)	4.3 (39.7)	4.5 (40.1)	1.5 (34.7)	−3.2 (26.2)	−7.6 (18.3)	−10.7 (12.7)	−5.6 (21.9)
Record low °C (°F)	−35.8 (−32.4)	−38.8 (−37.8)	−38.2 (−36.8)	−25.8 (−14.4)	−19.1 (−2.4)	−5.6 (21.9)	−3.0 (26.6)	−4.5 (23.9)	−7.9 (17.8)	−13.0 (8.6)	−21.0 (−5.8)	−33.0 (−27.4)	−38.8 (−37.8)
Average precipitation mm (inches)	48.8 (1.92)	29.9 (1.18)	31.5 (1.24)	32.0 (1.26)	30.3 (1.19)	25.1 (0.99)	51.6 (2.03)	62.4 (2.46)	60.5 (2.38)	62.4 (2.46)	62.4 (2.46)	55.7 (2.19)	552.6 (21.76)
Average precipitation days (≥ 0.1 mm)	10.5	10.6	11.7	10.7	9.5	9.1	10.3	10.9	12.4	13.6	14.4	13.5	137.2
Average snowy days	10.1	10.3	11.5	10.0	7.5	2.7	0.3	0.2	4.3	11.3	13.1	13.1	94.4
Average relative humidity (%)	68.5	68.5	67.3	69.1	74.8	78.2	78.5	79.2	73.3	69.7	68.6	68.6	72.0
Mean monthly sunshine hours	4	53	144	195	225	237	257	180	137	74	20	0	1,550
Source: Danish Meteorological Institute (humidity 1995–2020, sun 1980–1993)

== Demographics ==
=== Population ===
With 5,582 inhabitants in 2020, Sisimiut is one of the fastest-growing towns in Greenland, with migrants from the smaller settlements reinforcing the trend. Apart from Kangerlussuaq, it is the only settlement in the Qeqqata municipality exhibiting stable growth patterns over the last two decades.

The gender imbalance is evident in Sisimiut, with men consistently outnumbering women during the last two decades, running from 20% in 1991, to 13% in 2000 and 2010.

Nearly 10% of the town's inhabitants in 2010 were born outside Greenland, a decline from 16.5% in 1990 and 11.8% in 2000.

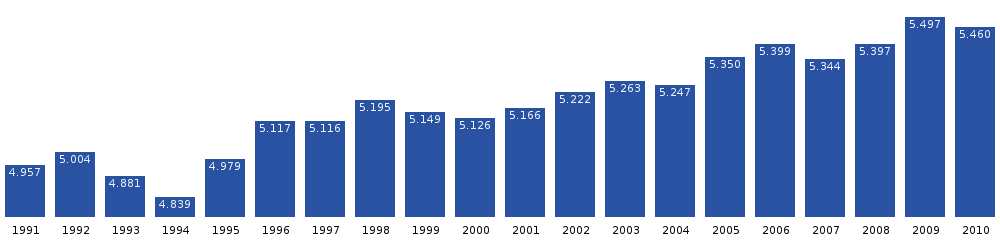
Sisimiut population growth dynamics, 1991–2010. Source: Statistics Greenland

=== Housing ===
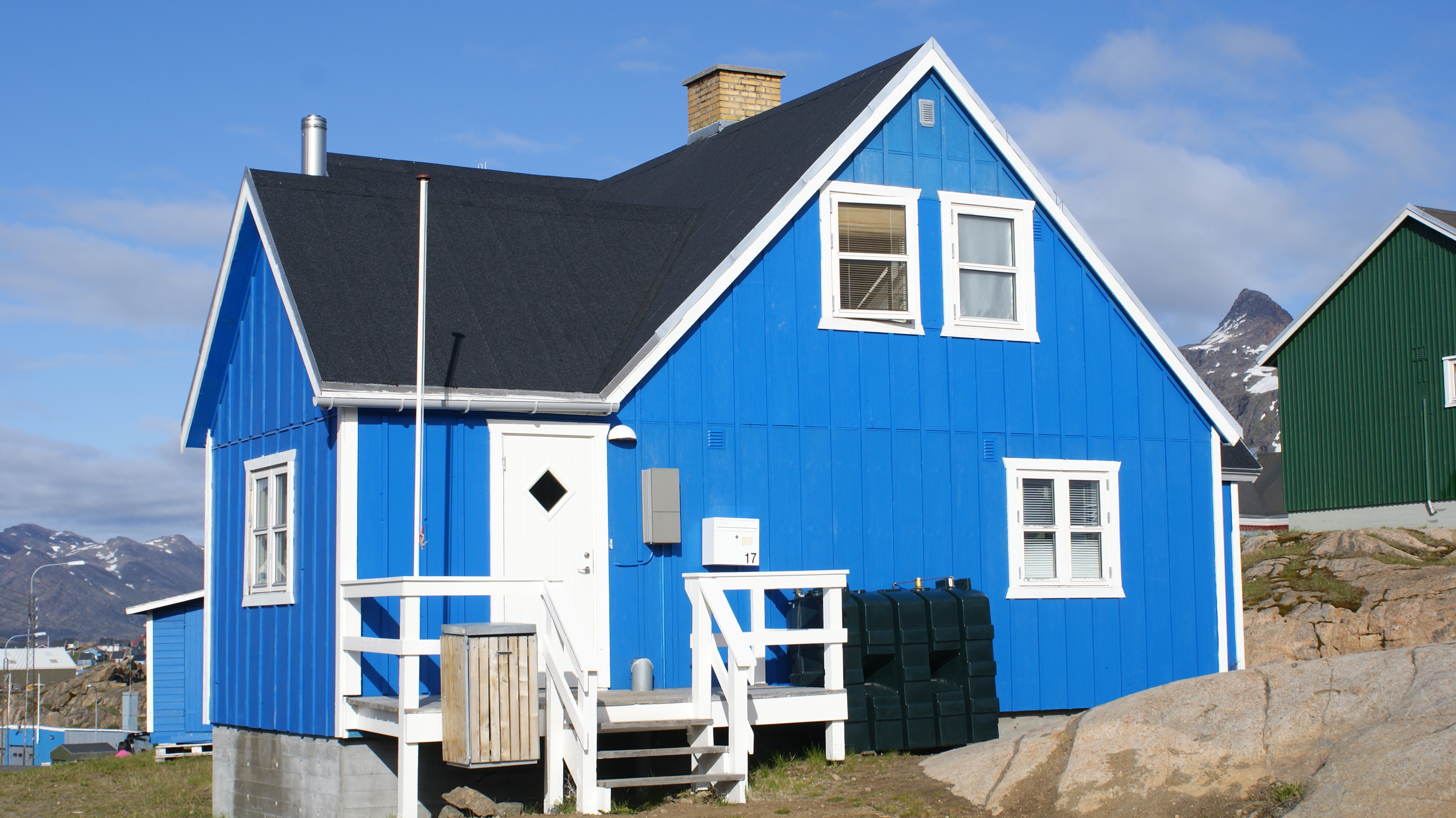
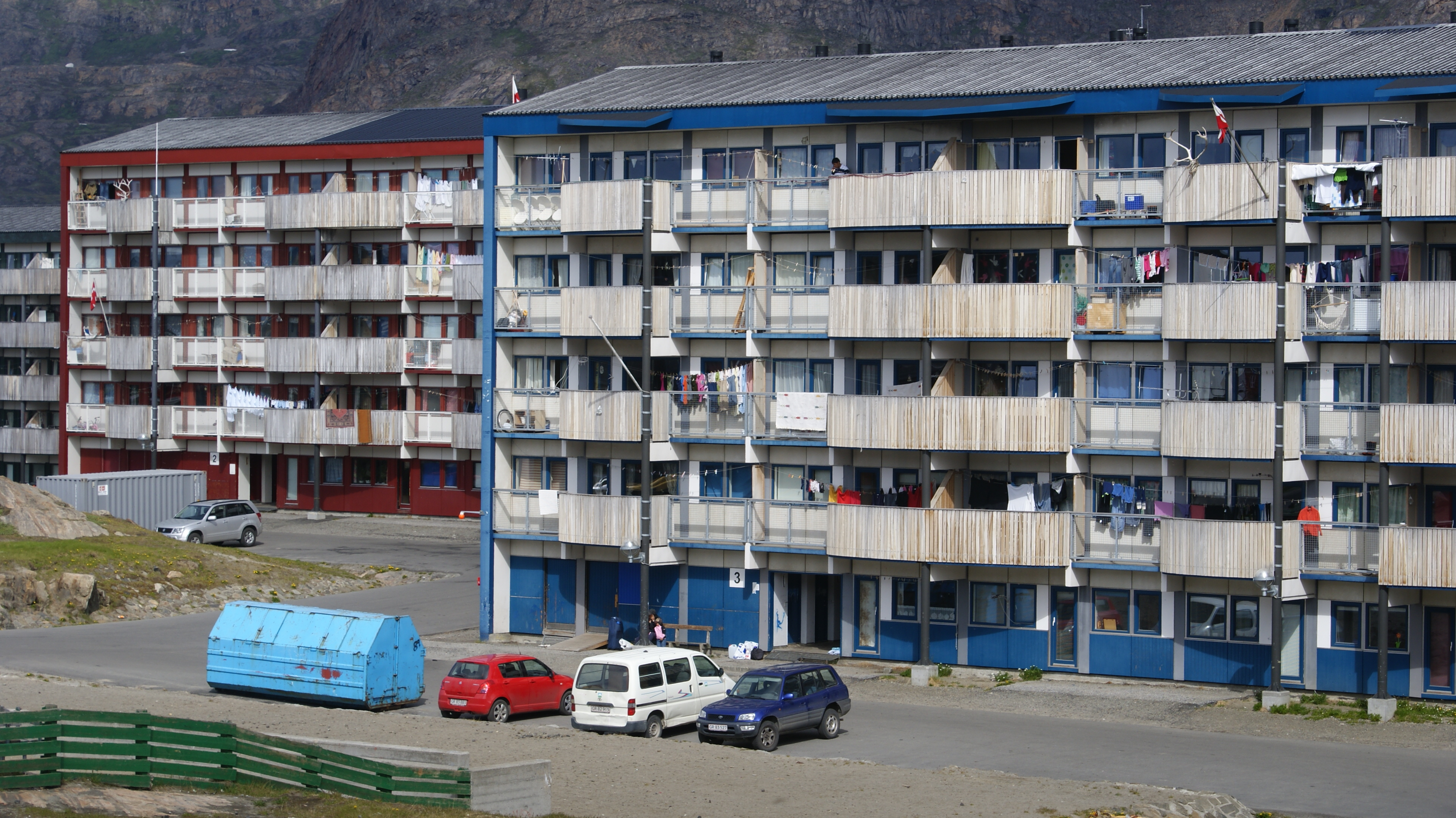
Contrasting types of housing in Sisimiut: a prefabricated, single-family house (left), and apartment blocks from the 1960s (right).

Unlike in Nuuk, the modern environmentally friendly construction technologies have not yet arrived to Sisimiut, and in 2010 the existing communal-block district remained in a state of partial disrepair. The Qeqqata municipality however is planning the town expansion in the 2010s, with the area north of the Kangerluarsunnguaq Bay reserved for real estate.

== Economy and infrastructure ==
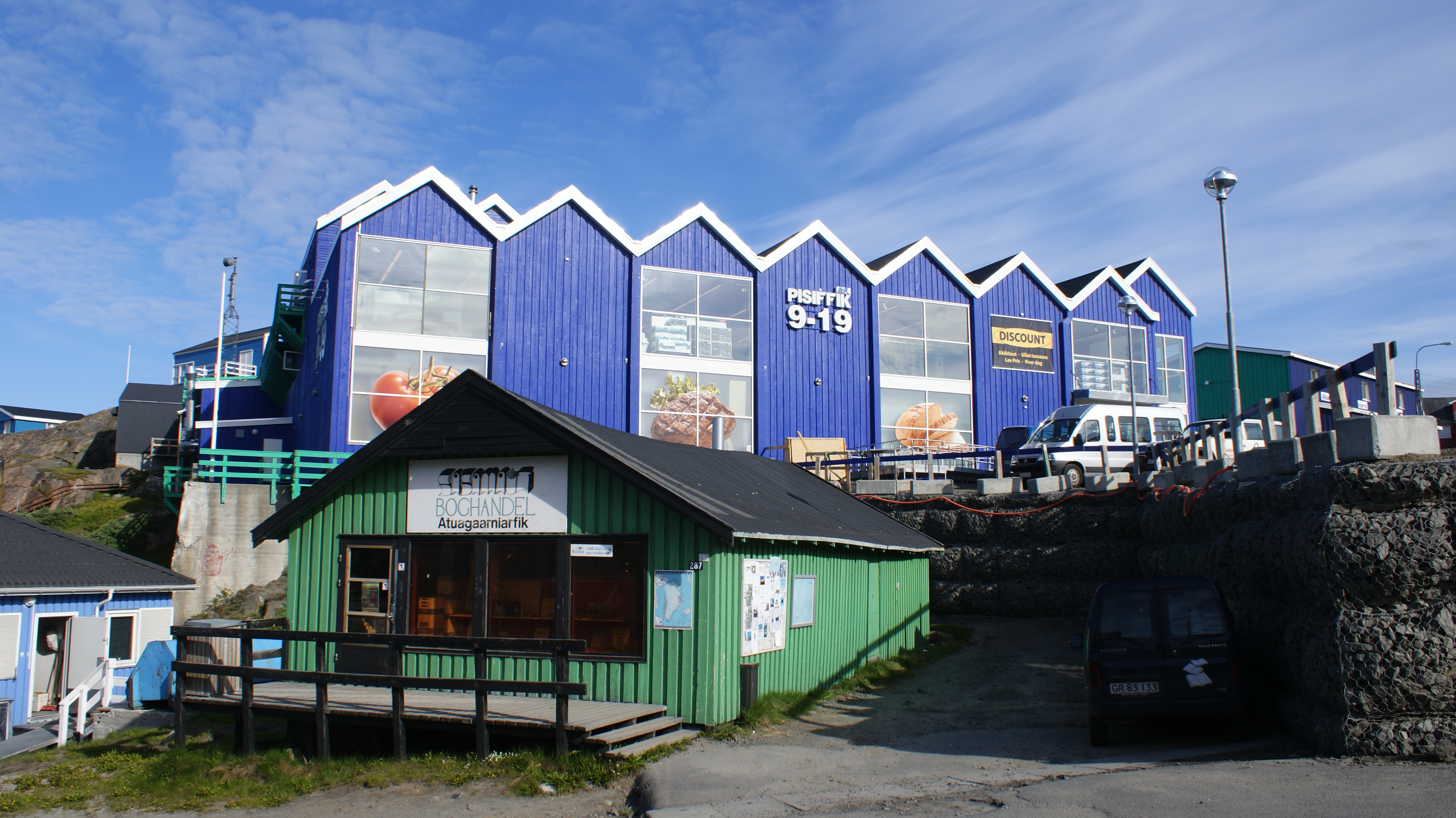
Pisiffik supermarket

=== Industry and services ===
Fishing is the principal industry in Sisimiut, with harvested stocks of shrimp, salmon, halibut and cod. The Royal Greenland fish processing plant at the port is the largest within Greenland and is amongst the most modern shrimp-shelling factories in the world. In 2008, supplied by 8 boats and the factory trawlers, the plant processed an annual amount of 20,180 tons of shrimp, around 1,680 tons per month. This was roughly constant throughout the year, although when fish catches were larger the fish was frozen. The plant eventually sold around 6,019 tonnes of shrimp. Hunting is also important to some of the local livelihoods, mainly seals, walrus, beluga whale, narwhal, reindeer and muskoxen.

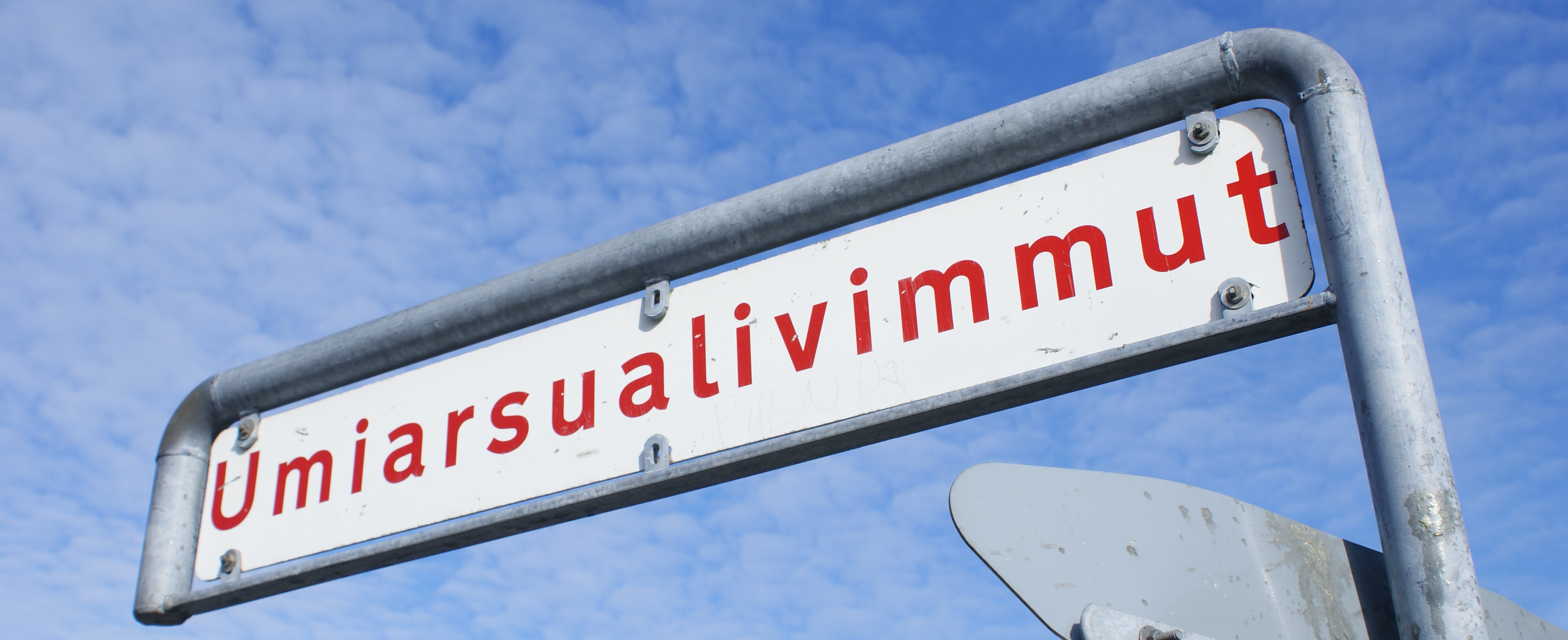
A street name sign in Greenlandic near the port (Note: The name derives from the word umiaq (women's boat) with the -suaq suffix (the big boat). These in turn form the word umiarsualivik (the place of big boats, or port), which leads to the final word, umiarsualivimmut (to the port, or simply the port road).)

KNI and its subsidiary Pilersuisoq, a state-owned chain of all-purpose general stores in Greenland, are based in Sisimiut. The Pilersuisoq chain operates in all small settlements in the country, as well as smaller towns which are not covered by supermarket chains. A range of shops operate in Sisimiut, from chain supermarkets of Pisiffik and Brugsen to independent outlets, also serving supplies to the smaller settlements in the region. Polaroil, a liquid fuel distribution company, is headquartered in Sisimiut. It employs 70 staff and operates 70 stations in Greenland. The headquarters were moved from Maniitsoq to Sisimiut in the late 2000s. In 2010 KNI announced plans to also move the operational base of Polaroil from Maniitsoq to Sisimiut, causing protests in the former community already experiencing depopulation. Sisimiut also has a small hospital/health centre with 19 beds.

There are advanced plans for the Alcoa aluminium smelting plant. As it is a vital decision for the town, wide public consultations were carried out in 2008–2010 by both the town authorities and the Government of Greenland in order to address potential environmental and social concerns.

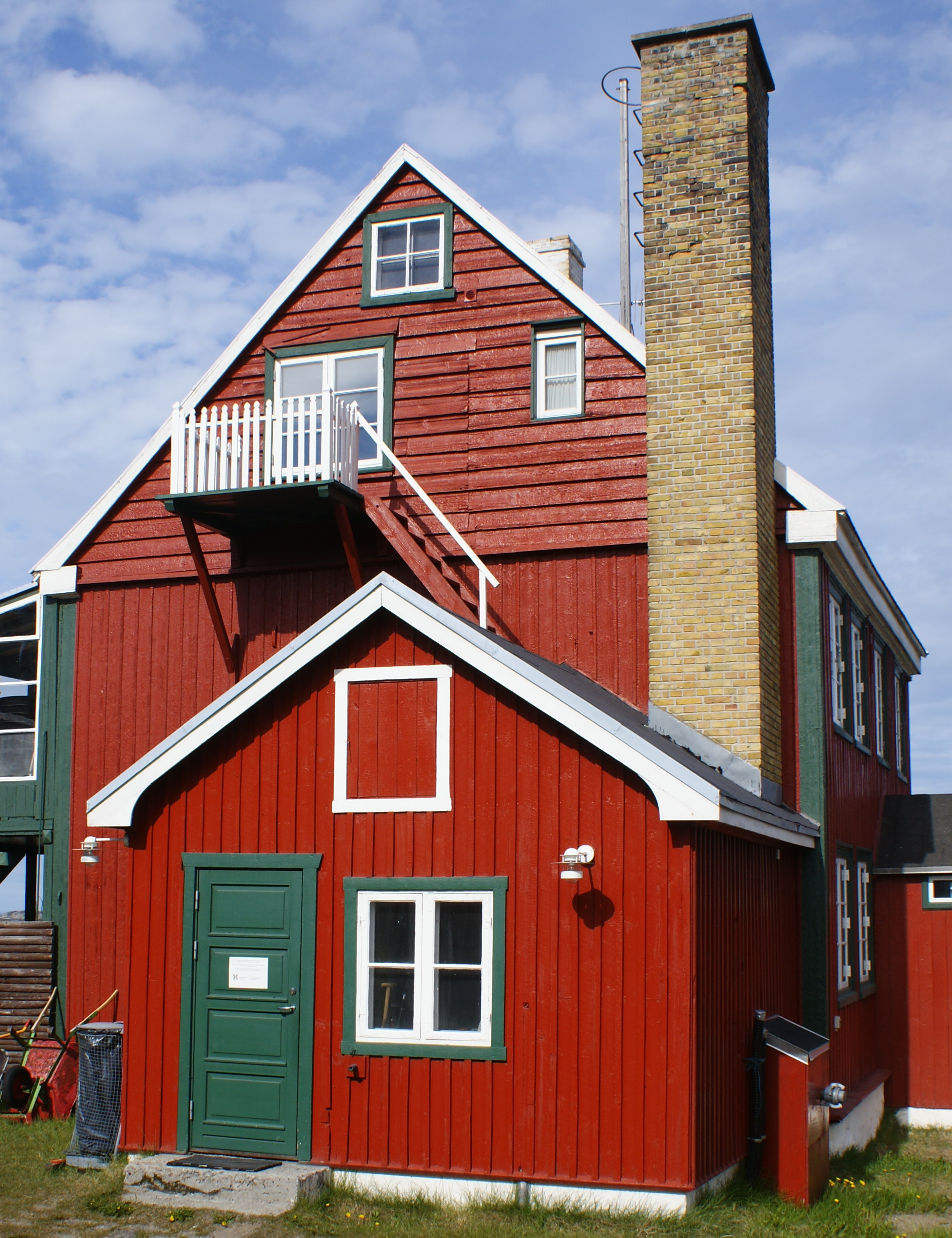
The former Colonial Manager's Home, now part of the Sisimiut Museum

Although rainfall is low, Sismiut has abundant natural supplies of fresh, drinkable surface water, collected from a reservoir under Alanngorsuaq. Water is also pumped to the waterworks from another lake around 2.5 kilometers away in the mountains. The water mains are preinsulated and electrically heated to supply the residents during the winter months. The water supply network is capable of producing some 882,000 cubic meters of water per year; two water-supplying lakes by the town have a combined annual minimum capacity of more than 7.2 million cubic meters.

=== Tourism ===
Tourist facilities in Sisimiut include several youth hostels and hotels. The town also has a heated open-air swimming pool, which is supported on stilts so that the heat does not melt the permafrost. Several camping sites are located in Sisimiut valley and near the Kangerluarsunnguaq bay. During winter, a ski lift operates at the foot of the Alanngorsuaq mountain, at the base of the northern slopes of Nasaasaaq.

Tourism is becoming increasingly important, with several outfitter companies based in town. Year-round operations offered include dogsledding, heliskiing, guided hiking, mountaineering, kayaking, and boating. The tough, 160 km (99 mi) long Arctic Circle Race takes place each winter, with the trail partially overlapping with the Polar Route from Sisimiut to Kangerlussuaq. The race was inaugurated in 1998, since then becoming an international competition.

== Education and culture ==
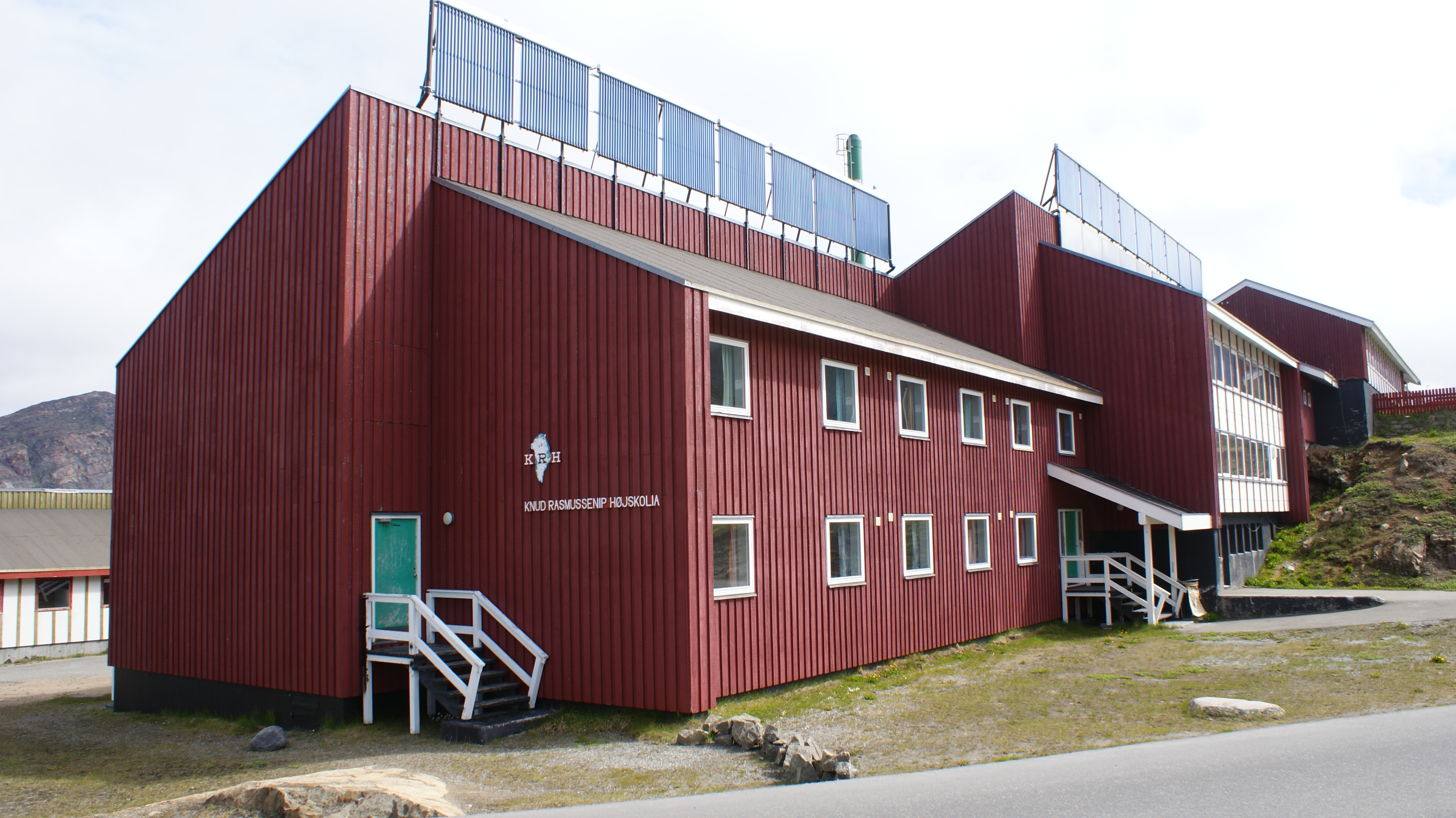
Knud Rasmussen High School

The Knud Rasmussen High School (Knud Rasmussenip Højskolia), founded in 1962, is located on the eastern outskirts of the town, west of the old heliport site. Apart from the traditional curriculum, it provides specialized courses in Greenland history and culture including skin preparation and ski instruction. The school is also notable for its special unit, the Women's High School (Greenlandic: Arnat ilinniarfiat) added in 1977, and focusing on traditional arts. During summer, the school building is used as a hostel. In autumn 2002, the school was responsible for erecting a series of stone sculptures around Sisimiut: near the airport, in the municipal building, at the Gertrud Rask Minde children's home, at Arnat Ilinniarfiat and around the school itself.

Sisimiut is home to Sanaartornermik Ilinniarfik, the construction engineering school with capacity for 200 students.

=== Sisimiut Museum ===
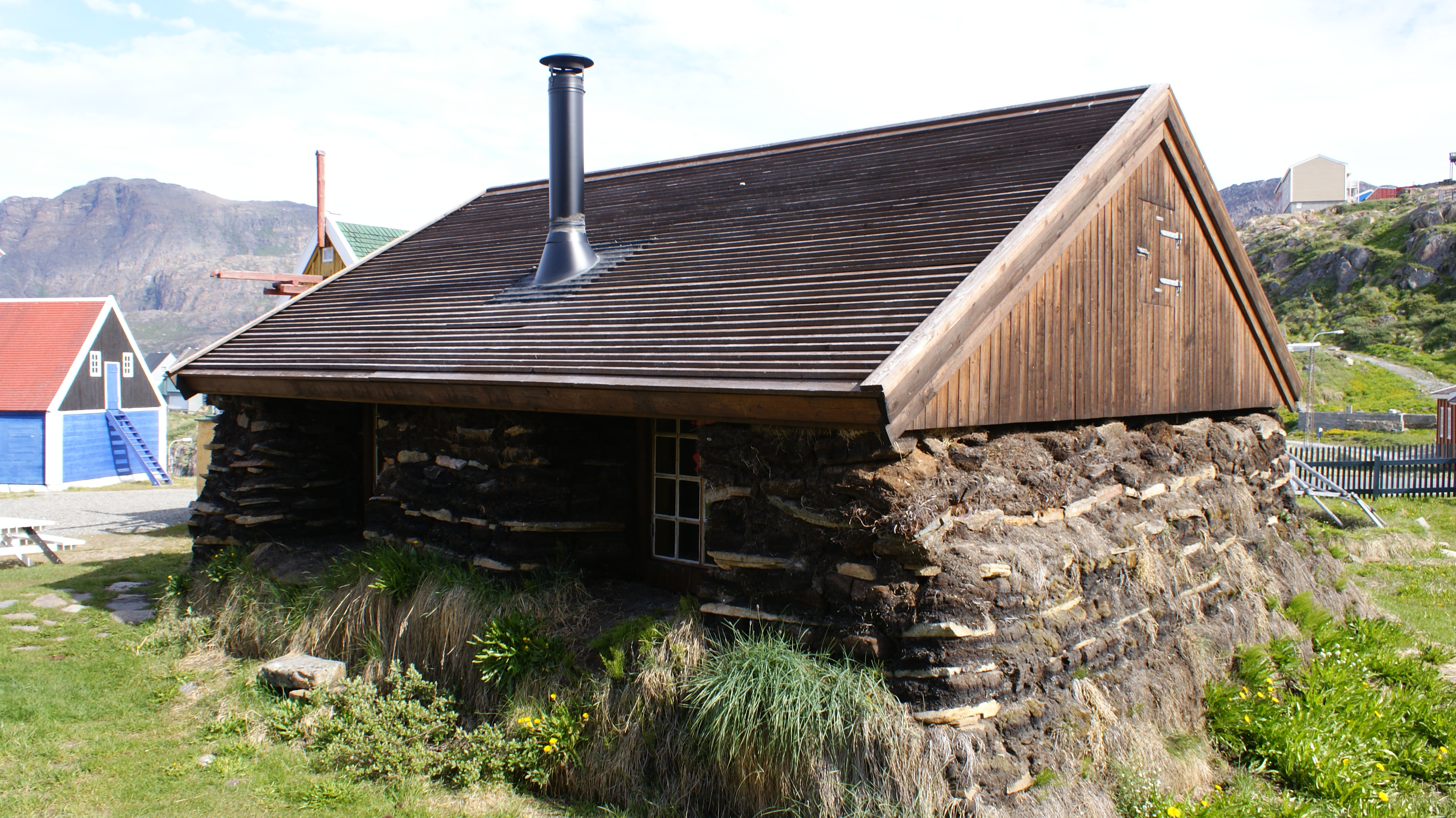
A traditional Greenlandic peat house, reconstructed at the Sisimiut Museum

Located in a historical building near the harbor, the Sisimiut Museum specializes in Greenlandic trade, industry and shipping, with artifacts based on ten years of archaeological research and excavations of the ancient Saqqaq culture settlements near the town, offering an insight into the culture of the region of 4,000 years ago.

The museum also hosts a collection of tools and domestic items collected during 1902–22, an inventory from the Old Church with the original altarpiece dated to approximately 1650, and paintings from the 1790s. The peat house reconstruction of an early 20th-century Greenlandic residence with domestic furniture is part of an outdoor exhibition. The exhibition includes the remains of a kayak from the 18th century and the Poul Madsen collection, a collection of handcraft, art, house items and ethnographic objects compiled over fifty years. The Greenlandic stone exhibition is housed in the Bygge og Anlægsskolen building.

=== Arts and crafts ===
The modern Taseralik Culture Centre (Greenlandic: Taseralik Kulturikkut) is located in the eastern part of Sisimiut, on the shore of the Nalunnguarfik lake. The centre often hosts traveling theatre troupes, as well as concerts, from classical to folk music. The Sisimiut Culture Day on 21 November is also celebrated at Taseralik. Greenlandic handicrafts, created in a workshop located in an old warehouse on the old harbor, are sold in the Greenland Travel Incoming's Arts n' Craft, and in several small shops along the main street. Greenland stones and sealskin products are created in the Natseq and Panigiit workshops.

== Transport ==
=== Air ===
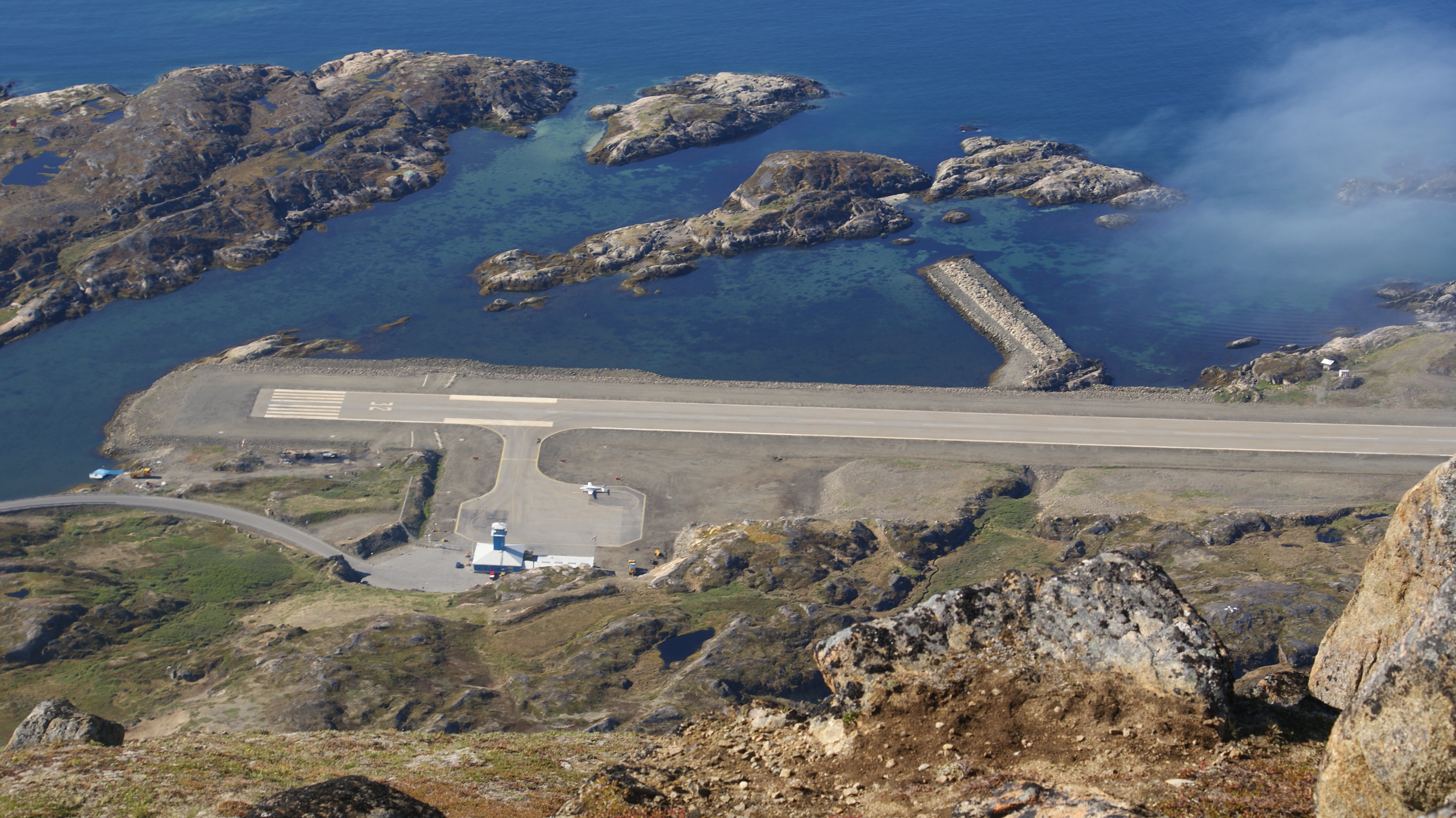
Sisimiut Airport runway

Sisimiut Airport is located 4.1 km (2.5 mi) to the northwest of the town, at the mouth of the Kangerluarsunnguaq Bay. Before the airport was opened in the 1990s, Sisimiut had been served by the now-closed heliport, located on the eastern outskirts of the town, in the Sisimiut valley. The airport has a short, 799 m (2,621 ft) runway suitable only for STOL airplanes. Air Greenland operates scheduled services to Nuuk, Ilulissat and Kangerlussuaq, all of which offer onward international travel. Taxis are available at the airport.

=== Sea ===
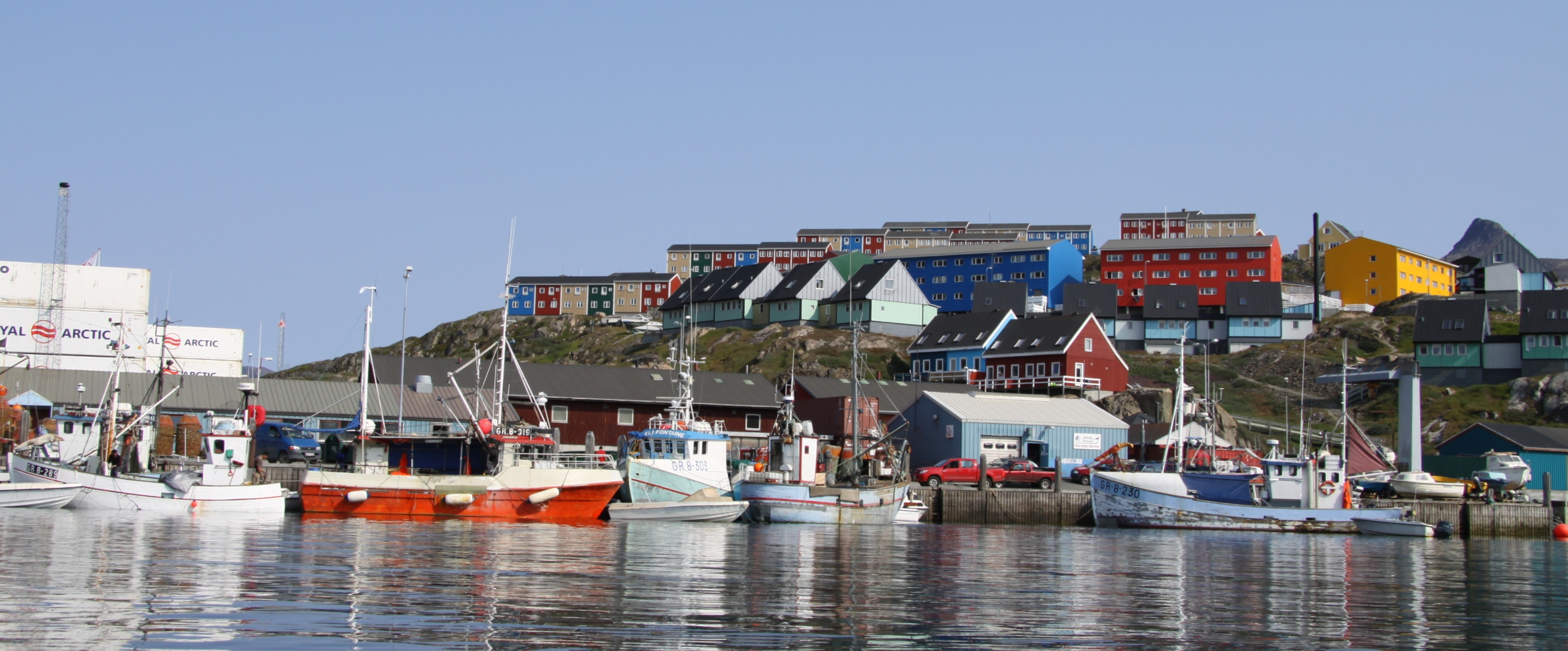
Port of Sisimiut.

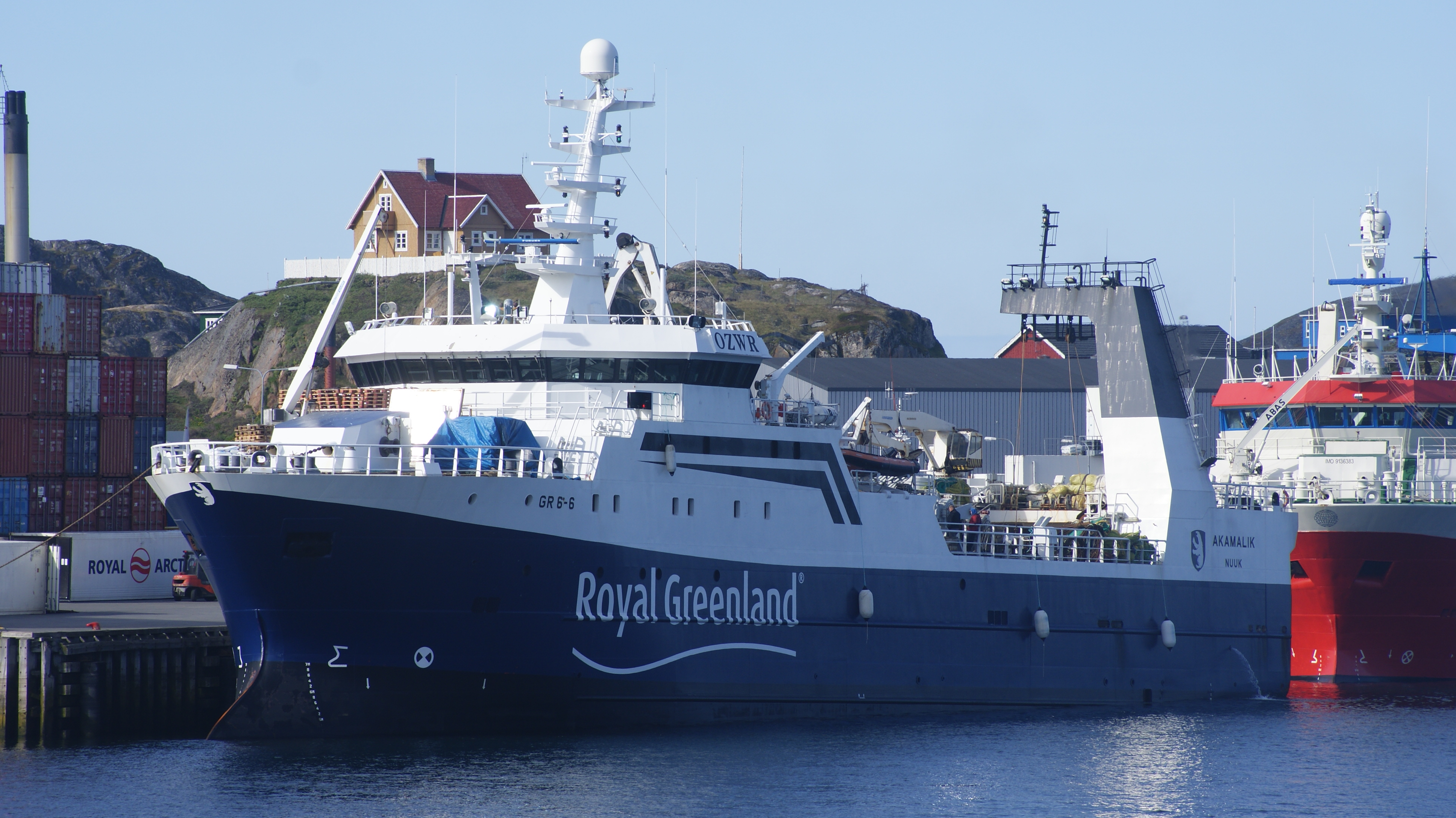
Akamalik, a Royal Greenland vessel based in Sisimiut, anchored in the port

There is a weekly Royal Arctic Line ferry to Nuuk, Itilleq and Sarfannguit. The port in Sisimiut is the northernmost year-round ice-free port in Greenland. M/S Akamalik, one of the largest ships in the fleet of Royal Greenland, is based in Sisimiut. Sisimiut is also home to the first shipyard of Greenland dating from 1931.The local kayak club operates at the bay harbor east of the port.

=== Ground ===
Roads in Sisimiut, including the road to the airport, are surfaced, but there is no proper road linking Sisimiut to any other settlement, like in all of Greenland. The town has its own bus network. In winter, dog sled routes are used to link to settlements farther north. Snowmobiles are, as a more modern approach, also used. Transport within a town is usually done by foot, although both private cars and the city bus – which drives loops through town – are popular.

==== ATV track to Kangerlussuaq ====
A 130 kilometre-long (80 mi) track to Kangerlussuaq, traversable by all-terrain vehicles, UTVs and off-road vehicles (Unimog-type vehicles), was opened in 2025. It is dubbed the 'Arctic Circle Track', and follows a similar route to the Arctic Circle Trail. The total distance from Sisimiut to Kangerlussuaq is 153 km (including existing roads). It is the first land based connection between two towns in Greenland, outside of snowmobile and dog-sled transport in winter. The track is very rudimentary in construction and was built in 2021-2025, at a cost of 25 million DKK (€3M).

It is envisioned that this track will be upgraded in the future to a proper gravel road, but at an estimated cost of 500 million Danish krone (€67M), no timeline is in place.

== Twin towns ==
Sisimiut is twinned with:

- – Albertslund Municipality, Denmark
- – Klaksvík, Faroe Islands

Sisimiut has friendship links with:

- – Whitstable, United Kingdom
