= Kangerluarsuk Tulleq =

Fjord in Greenland

Location within Greenland

Kangerluarsuk Tulleq (old spelling: Kangerdluarssuk Tugdleq) is a 28 km (17 mi) long fjord in the Qeqqata municipality in western Greenland. The fjord is of roughly east–west orientation, emptying into Davis Strait in the west.

== Geography ==
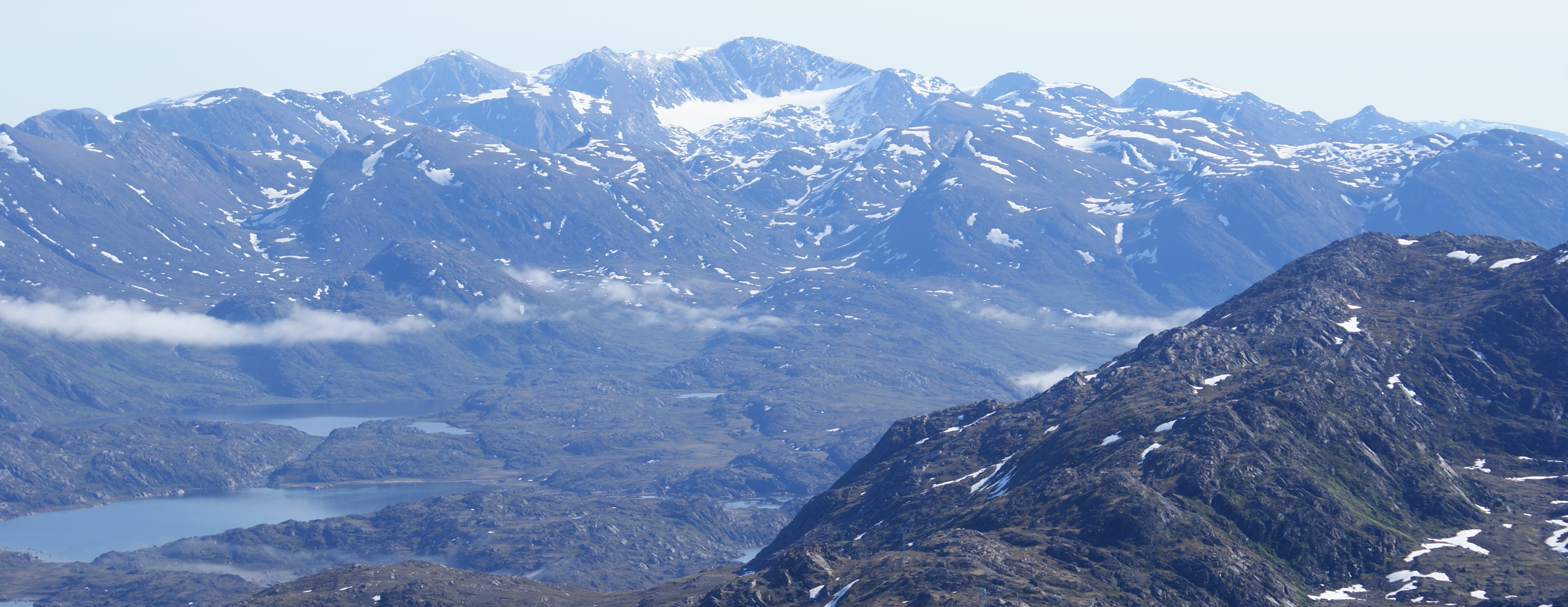
The wide Aqqutikitsoq massif lies to the north of the fjord head.

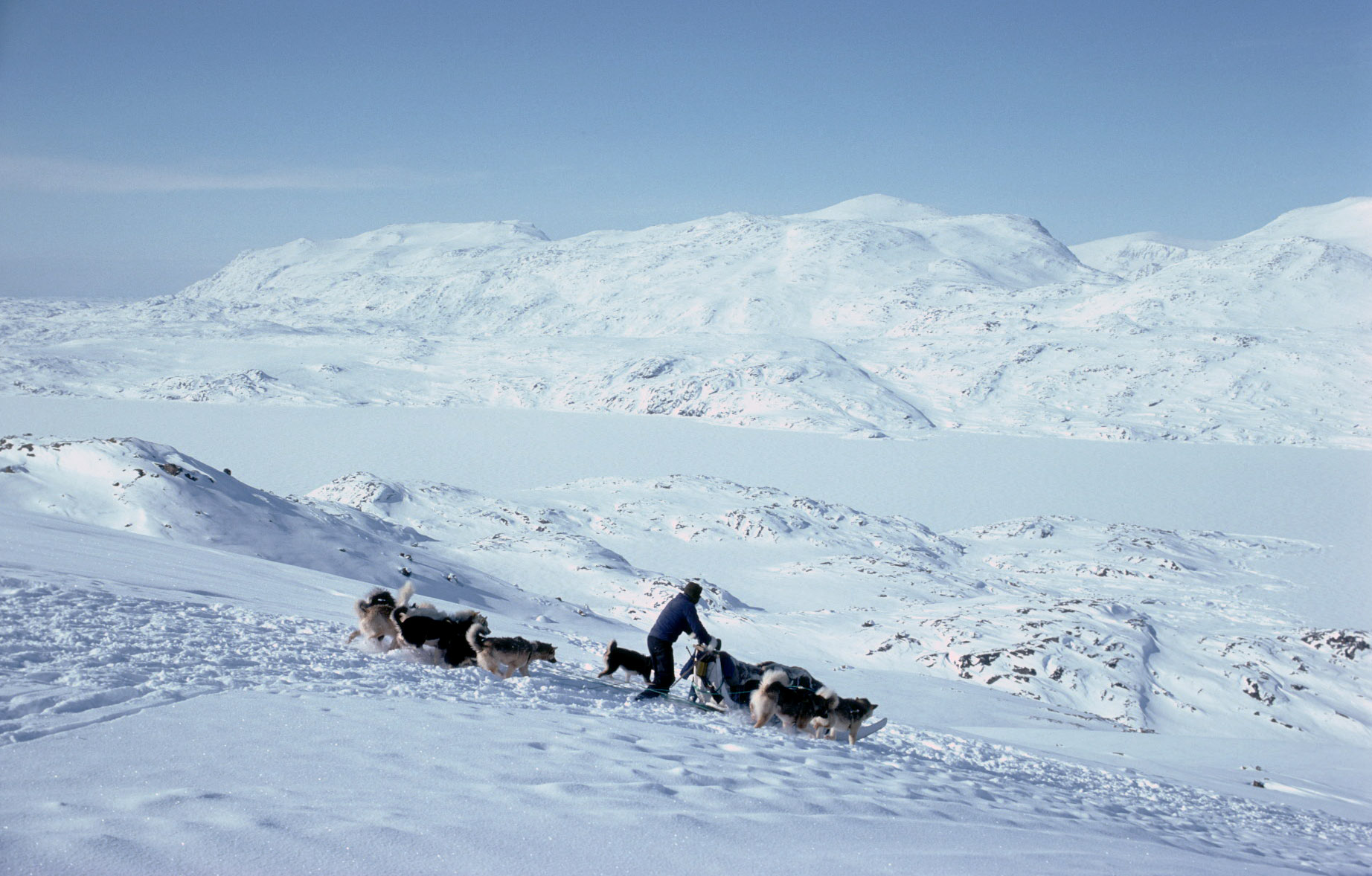
Dog sledge descending into Kangerluarsuk Tulleq in April.

The fjord mouth is located at approximately 67°01′00″N 53°50′00″W, 12 km (7.5 mi) to the northwest of the town of Sisimiut. In the northeast, the fjord is bounded by the partially glaciated Aqqutikitsoq massif, culminating in 1,448 m (4,751 ft). To the northwest, undulating terrain under Akornata Qaqqaa mountain (801 m (2,628 ft)) constitutes the terminal point of a long mountain range extending from the Pingu mountain group halfway between Davis Strait and the Greenland ice sheet (Greenlandic: Sermersuaq). The range flattens considerably towards the east in the area of Kangaamiut dike swarm north of Kangerlussuaq, due to pressure exerted by the icesheet for long periods in the past.

The head of the fjord is located at approximately 66°59′48″N 53°12′04″W. To the south, the fjord is bounded by the long Majoriaq range, culminating in the west in the Ujarasussuliup Qaqqaa (423 m (1,388 ft)) and Palasip Qaqqaa (544 m (1,785 ft)) mountains. The east–west range continues through Aappilattorsuaq massif (907 m (2,976 ft)) to the east, connecting with the northern range to the northeast of the head of the fjord.

== Settlement ==
There are no settlements on the shores of the fjord. The closest settlement is Sisimiut to the southeast of Palasip Qaqqaa.

== Tourism ==
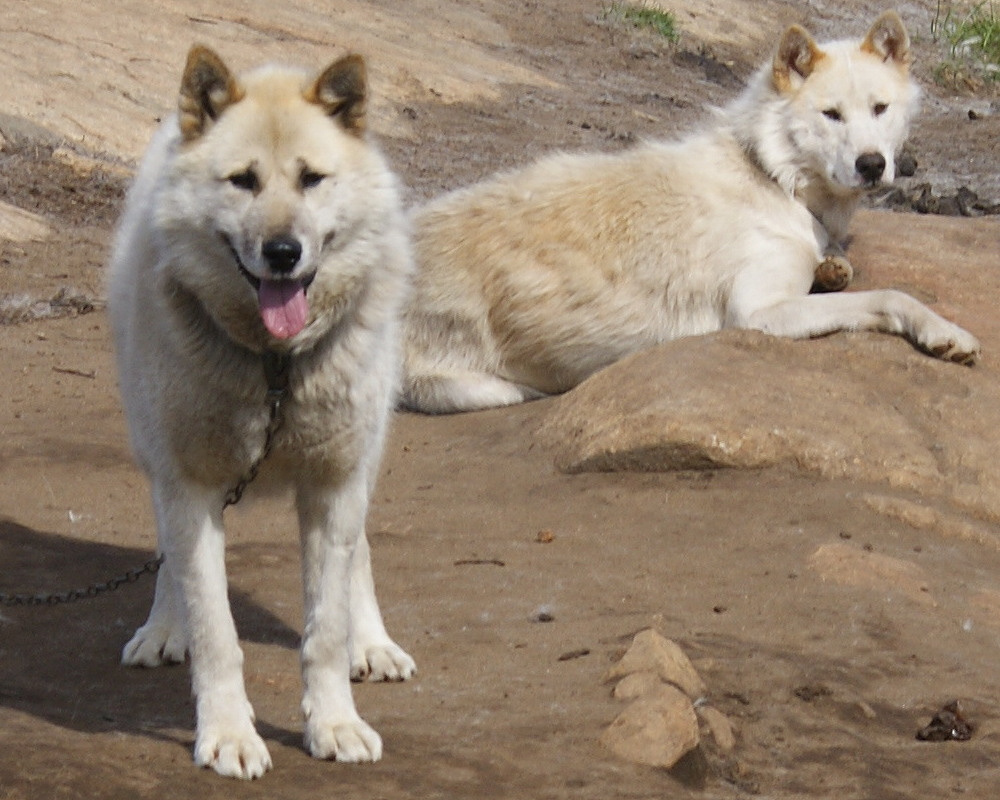
Sled dogs from Sisimiut work only during winter, gathering strength during the summer period of inactivity.

There are two utility huts at the head of the fjord, maintained by the authorities of Sisimiut. They serve as shelter for hikers on the Polar Route from Sisimiut to Kangerlussuaq, and for overnight dogsled trips from the town. The tough, 160 km (99 mi) long Arctic Circle Race takes place each winter, with the trail partially overlapping with the Arctic Circle Trail at the head of the fjord. The race was inaugurated in 1998, since then becoming an international competition.
