= Maniitsoq structure =

Proposed impact structure in Greenland

- Location within Greenland
- Location: Maniitsoq, Greenland; 65°15′N 51°50′W

Impact crater structure
- Confidence: Potential (2)
- Diameter: 100 km (62 mi)
- Age: Mesoarchean; ~3 Ga
- Exposed: Yes

The Maniitsoq structure is a geologic structure resembling a meteorite impact structure located in the Akia terrane of the North Atlantic Craton, centred about 55 km (34 mi) south-east of the town of Maniitsoq, Greenland, at 65°15′N 51°50′W. In spite of this resemblance, the structure is caused by regional geologic processes (magmatism, tectonism and metamorphism) that reworked and stabilized the North Atlantic Craton during the Mesoarchean to Neoarchean eras.

Originally notable for being proposed as the oldest known impact crater on Earth (3 billion years old), the proposal was criticised for not meeting established criteria for impact craters. Subsequent studies demonstrated no evidence for an impact structure, and observations directly contradict the impact structure proposals. The Maniitsoq structure is not recognised as an impact structure by the Earth Impact Database.

== Impact structure proposal ==
Garde et al. suggested the presence of a ~100 kilometres (62 mi) scale impact structure, formed by the impact of a large comet or meteorite, in the Maniitsoq region. They argued that consensus accepted diagnostic criteria for recognising impacts should be relaxed when searching for particularly large, ancient, and eroded impacts, and instead suggested the presence of an impact structure on the basis of the following observations:

- the presence of an irregular aeromagnetic anomaly.
- curved ~100 km scale deformation patterns.
- intense fracturing.
- sheets of crushed rock without the presence of faults.
- a 35 by 50 square kilometres (14 sq mi × 19 sq mi) central domain of homogenised rocks (the Finnefjeld Orthogneiss Complex).
- remelting of rocks around the central domain.
- formation of breccias.
- proposed evidence of direct K-feldspar melting.
- planar elements within minerals.
- presence of shear zones.
- presence of ultramafic sills (the Maniitsoq Norite Belt).
- proposed widespread hydrothermal alteration.
- a coincidence of a zircon U-Pb ages at approximately 2975 million years ago (Ma). The impact was argued to post-date the end of deformation in the Maniitsoq region. The age was subsequently refined to 3000.9 ± 1.9 Ma based on mean age of five orthogneiss samples suggested to represent rocks melted and hydrothermally altered by the impact.

A 2023 study including many of the same authors also considered the morphology of microplanes found in zircons in site as additional evidence of the impact.

The proposal was criticised by Reimold et al. for devising new criteria for recognising an impact, because it failed to meet existing criteria. Furthermore, they argued that the structure was not circular, that there was no evidence for shock metamorphism, and no geochemical evidence for an impact. In particular, they demonstrated that Garde et al. had mistaken features commonly found in deformed and metamorphosed terranes, such as migmatites and inclusion trails in quartz, for shock features, such as microbreccias and planar deformation features.

== Evidence against an impact ==
Subsequent studies in the Maniitsoq region demonstrated that deformation in the region continued after the proposed impact age, with major metamorphic and deformation events at ~2.86–2.70 Ga and ~2.55 Ga. Extensive deformation was noted both near the proposed impact centre and in ultramafic rocks previously suggested to be post-tectonic. Kirkland et al. noted that it was difficult to reconcile the preservation of a circular impact structure and other proposed impact related features with the severe deformation that followed, and instead interpreted the 'impact' features as the result of multiple phases of high-grade metamorphism and partial melting.

Further zircon U-Pb dating also contradicts an impact model. The ages of rocks interpreted as impact melts within the impact structure are indistinguishable from the ages of the unaffected rocks from outside the impact structure. This requires that the impact coincidentally occurred at the same time as major (non impact-related) crustal formation in the region, which Gardiner et al. consider unlikely. Furthermore, Gardiner et al. note the presence of a second homogeneous body of orthogneiss further east within the Akia terrane, the Taserssuaq Orthogneiss Complex, which formed at 2982 Ma and contains homogeneous gneisses and magnetic anomalies that are very similar to the Finnefjeld Orthogneiss Complex, interpreted to be the centre of the impact structure. This orthogneiss complex is too young to have formed in response to the proposed impact, and demonstrates that similar orthogneiss complexes and magnetic anomalies can be generated without an impact event. Dating of metamorphic zircon and rocks formed during high temperature metamorphism at ~3 Ga, indicate that the metamorphic event lasted for >40 million years, which is too long to have been caused by a single impact. Instead, the metamorphism and deformation is better explained by endogenic (terrestrial) processes, such as stagnant lid processes or an ultra-hot orogenic event. Finally, new dating of the ultramafic intrusions of the Maniitsoq Norite Belt shows that these formed at 3013 Ma, and are therefore too old to have been generated by the impact event.

Further evidence against an impact origin comes from analyses of oxygen isotopes within the ultramafic intrusions of the Maniitsoq Norite Belt, which show no evidence of the widespread hydrothermal alteration asserted to have been caused by the impact. This is supported by geochemical and petrographical observations from the same rocks, which show that most rocks were largely dry, with only limited local hydrothermal alteration occurring adjacent to intrusions of much younger granitic rocks.

Due to the reasons outlined above, the Maniitsoq Structure is widely believed not to have formed due to a giant impact, and is instead interpreted to reflect terrestrial tectonic processes.

== See also ==
- List of possible impact structures on Earth
