= Impact event =

Collision of two astronomical objects

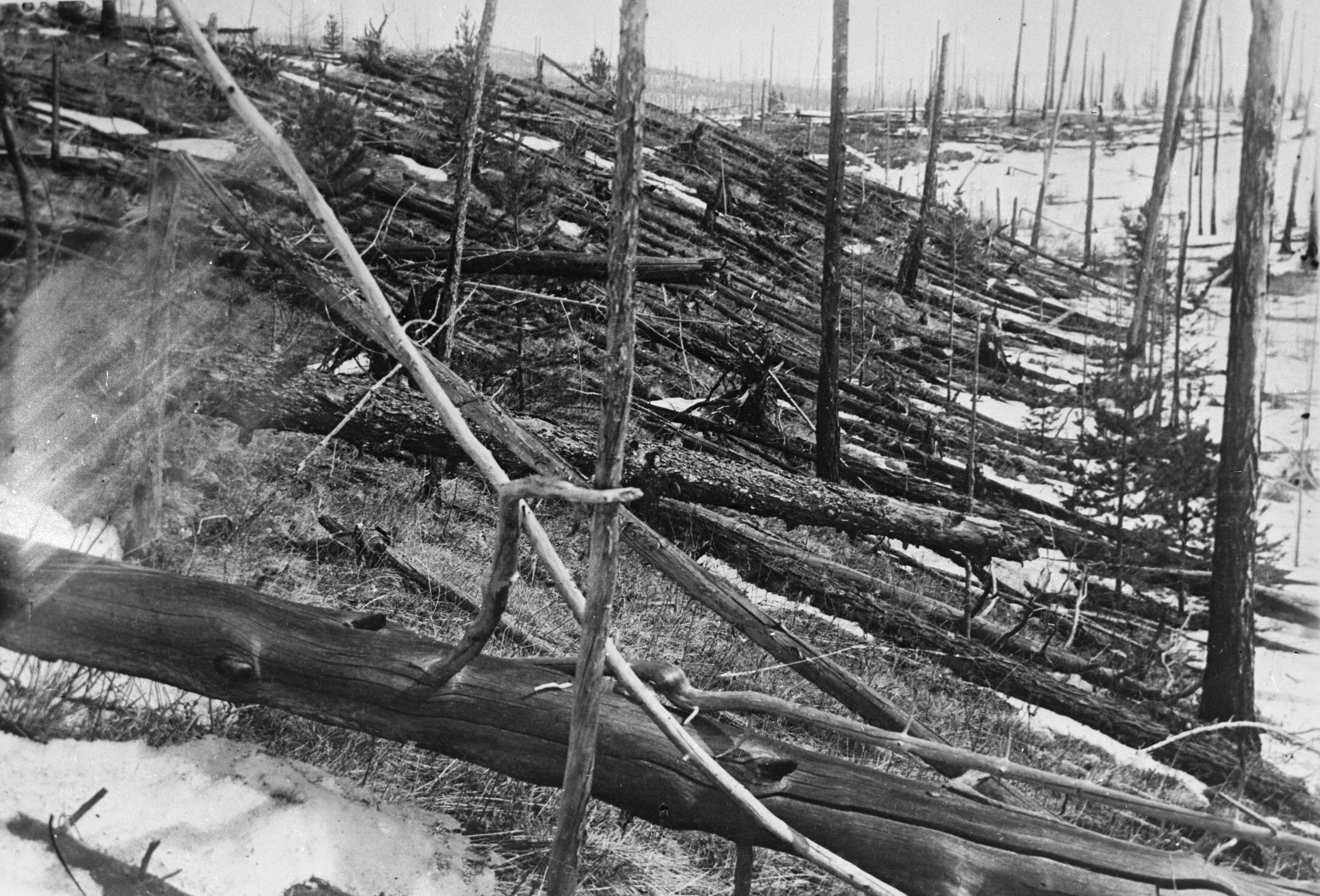
Damage to trees caused by the Tunguska event. The object, just 50–80 metres (160–260 ft) across, exploded 6–10 km (3.7–6.2 mi) above the surface, shattering windows hundreds of kilometres away.

An impact event is a collision between astronomical objects causing measurable effects. Impact events have been found to regularly occur in planetary systems, though the most frequent involve asteroids, comets or meteoroids and have minimal effect. When large objects impact terrestrial planets such as the Earth, there can be significant physical and biospheric consequences, as the impacting body is usually traveling at several kilometres per second (km/s). The minimum impact speed for bodies striking Earth is 11.2 km/s (25,054 mph; 40,320 km/h), the Escape velocity of the Earth. While planetary atmospheres can mitigate some of these impacts through the effects of atmospheric entry, many large bodies retain sufficient energy to reach the surface and cause substantial damage. This results in the formation of impact craters and structures, shaping the dominant landforms found across various types of solid objects found in the Solar System. Their prevalence and ubiquity present the strongest empirical evidence of the frequency and scale of these events.

Impact events appear to have played a significant role in the evolution of the Solar System since its formation. Major impact events have significantly shaped Earth's history, and the formation of the Earth–Moon system has been hypothesized to be the result of a giant impact. Interplanetary impacts have also been proposed to explain the retrograde rotation of Uranus and Venus. Impact events also appear to have played a significant role in the evolutionary history of life. Impacts may have helped deliver the building blocks for life (the panspermia theory relies on this premise). Impacts have been suggested as the origin of water on Earth. They have also been implicated in several mass extinctions. The prehistoric Chicxulub impact, 66 million years ago, is believed to be the cause not only of the Cretaceous–Paleogene extinction event but acceleration of the evolution of mammals, leading to their dominance and, in turn, setting in place conditions for the eventual rise of humans.

Throughout recorded history, hundreds of Earth impacts (and exploding bolides) have been reported, with some occurrences causing deaths, injuries, property damage, or other significant localised consequences. One of the best-known events recorded in modern times was the Tunguska event, which occurred in 1908 in a very sparsely populated part of Siberia, Russia. The 2013 Chelyabinsk meteor event is the only known such incident in modern times to result in numerous injuries. Its meteor is the largest recorded object to have encountered the Earth since the Tunguska event. The Comet Shoemaker–Levy 9 impact provided the first direct observation of an extraterrestrial collision of Solar System objects, when the comet broke apart and collided with Jupiter in July 1994. An extrasolar impact was observed in 2013, when a massive terrestrial planet impact was detected around the star ID8 in the star cluster NGC 2547 by NASA's Spitzer Space Telescope and confirmed by ground observations. Impact events have been a plot and background element in science fiction.

In April 2018, the B612 Foundation reported: "It's 100 percent certain we'll be hit [by a devastating asteroid], but we're not 100 percent certain when." Also in 2018, physicist Stephen Hawking considered in his final book Brief Answers to the Big Questions that an asteroid collision was the biggest threat to the planet. In June 2018, the US National Science and Technology Council warned that America is unprepared for an asteroid impact event, and has developed and released the "National Near-Earth Object Preparedness Strategy Action Plan" to better prepare. According to expert testimony in the United States Congress in 2013, NASA would require at least five years of preparation before a mission to intercept an asteroid could be launched. On 26 September 2022, the Double Asteroid Redirection Test demonstrated the deflection of an asteroid. It was the first such experiment to be carried out by humankind and was considered to be highly successful. The orbital period of the target body was changed by 32 minutes. The criterion for success was a change of more than 73 seconds.

== Impacts and the Earth ==
World map in equirectangular projection of the impact structures on the Earth Impact Database as of November 2017 (in the SVG file, hover over a structure to show its details)

Several major impact events have significantly shaped Earth's history, having been implicated in the formation of the Earth–Moon system, the evolutionary history of life, the origin of water on Earth, and several mass extinctions. Impact structures are the result of impact events on solid objects and, as the dominant landforms on many of the System's solid objects, present the most solid evidence of prehistoric events. Notable impact events include the hypothesized Late Heavy Bombardment, which would have occurred early in the history of the Earth–Moon system, and the confirmed Chicxulub impact 66 million years ago, believed to be the cause of the Cretaceous–Paleogene extinction event.

=== Frequency and risk ===
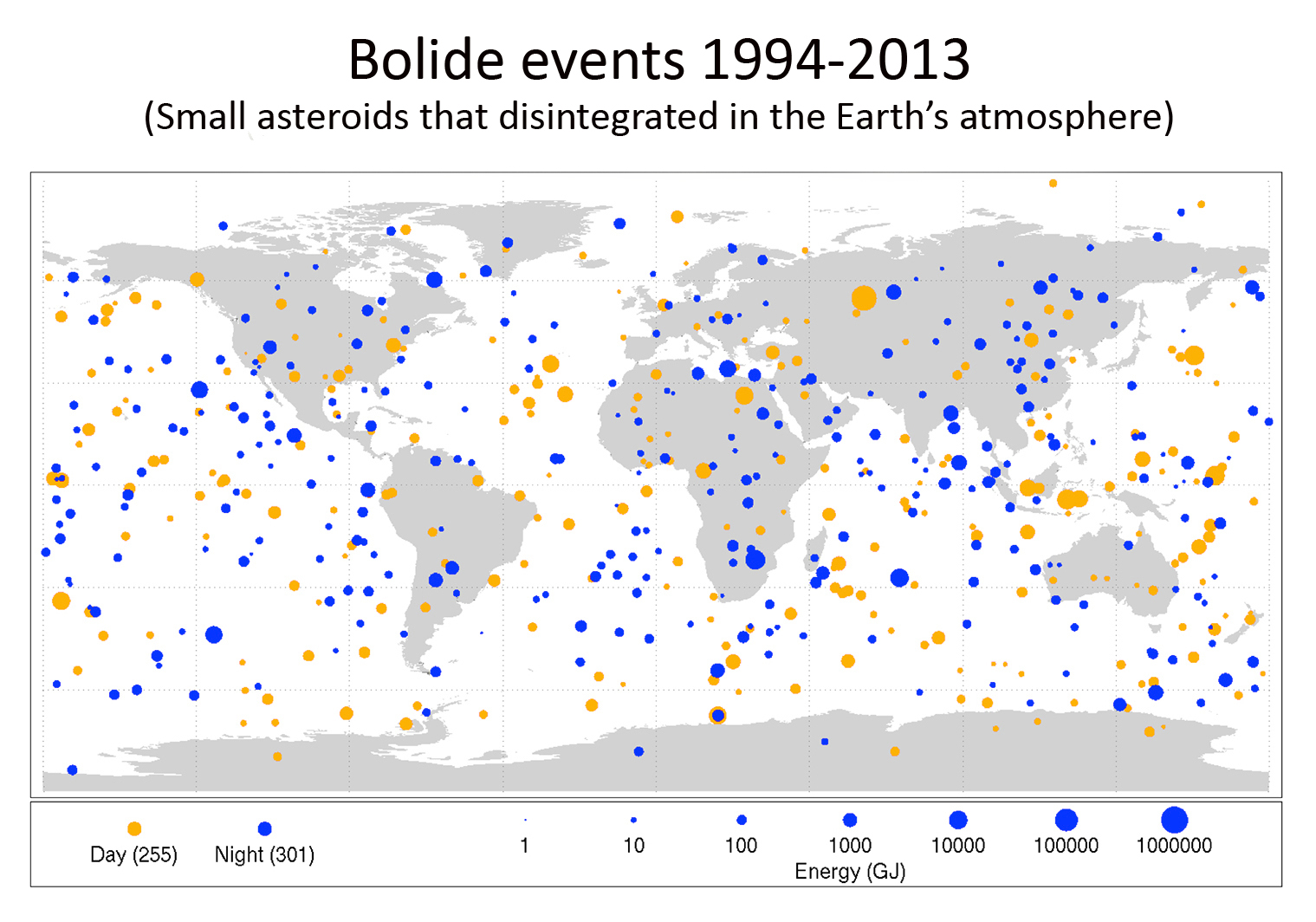
Frequency of small asteroids roughly 1 to 20 meters in diameter impacting Earth's atmosphere.

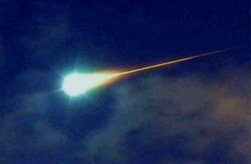
A bolide undergoing atmospheric entry

Small objects frequently collide with Earth. There is an inverse relationship between the size of the object and the frequency of such events. The lunar cratering record shows that the frequency of impacts decreases as approximately the cube of the resulting crater's diameter, which is on average proportional to the diameter of the impactor. Asteroids with a 1 km (3,280 ft) diameter strike Earth every 500,000 years on average. Large collisions – with 5 km (3.1 mi) objects – happen approximately once every twenty million years. The last known impact of an object of 10 km (6.2 mi) or more in diameter was at the Cretaceous–Paleogene extinction event 66 million years ago.

The energy released by an impactor depends on diameter, density, velocity, and angle. The diameter of most near-Earth asteroids that have not been studied by radar or infrared can generally only be estimated within about a factor of two, by basing it on the asteroid's brightness. The density is generally assumed, because the diameter and mass, from which density can be calculated, are also generally estimated. Due to Earth's escape velocity, the minimum impact velocity is 11 km/s with asteroid impacts averaging around 17 kilometres per second (38,000 mph; 61,000 km/h) on the Earth. The most probable impact angle is 45 degrees.

Impact conditions such as asteroid size and speed, but also density and impact angle determine the kinetic energy released in an impact event. The more energy is released, the more damage is likely to occur on the ground due to the environmental effects triggered by the impact. Such effects can be shock waves, heat radiation, the formation of craters with associated earthquakes, and tsunamis if bodies of water are hit. Human populations are vulnerable to these effects if they live within the affected zone. Large seiche waves arising from earthquakes and large-scale deposit of debris can also occur within minutes of impact, thousands of kilometres from impact.

==== Airbursts ====
Stony asteroids with a diameter of 4 meters (13 ft) enter Earth's atmosphere about once a year. Asteroids with a diameter of 7 m (23 ft) enter the atmosphere about every 5 years with as much kinetic energy as the atomic bomb dropped on Hiroshima (approximately 16 kilotons of TNT), but the air burst is reduced to just 5 kilotons. These ordinarily explode in the upper atmosphere and most or all of the solids are vaporized. However, asteroids with a diameter of 20 m (66 ft), and which strike Earth approximately twice every century, produce more powerful airbursts. The 2013 Chelyabinsk meteor was estimated to be about 20 m in diameter with an airburst of around 500 kilotons, an explosion 30 times the Hiroshima bomb impact. Much larger objects may impact the solid earth and create a crater.

Stony asteroid impacts that generate an airburst
Impactor diameter	Kinetic energy at		Airburst altitude	Average frequency (years)	Recorded fireballs (CNEOS) (1988–2018)
Impactor diameter	atmospheric entry	airburst	Airburst altitude	Average frequency (years)	Recorded fireballs (CNEOS) (1988–2018)
4 m (13 ft)	3 kt	0.75 kt	42.5 km (139,000 ft)	1.3	54
7 m (23 ft)	16 kt	5 kt	36.3 km (119,000 ft)	4.6	15
10 m (33 ft)	47 kt	19 kt	31.9 km (105,000 ft)	10	2
15 m (49 ft)	159 kt	82 kt	26.4 km (87,000 ft)	27	1
20 m (66 ft)	376 kt	230 kt	22.4 km (73,000 ft)	60	1
30 m (98 ft)	1.3 Mt	930 kt	16.5 km (54,000 ft)	185	0
50 m (160 ft)	5.9 Mt	5.2 Mt	8.7 km (29,000 ft)	764	0
70 m (230 ft)	16 Mt	15.2 Mt	3.6 km (12,000 ft)	1,900	0
85 m (279 ft)	29 Mt	28 Mt	0.58 km (1,900 ft)	3,300	0
Based on density of 2600 kg/m^{3}, speed of 17 km/s, and an impact angle of 45°

Stony asteroids that impact sedimentary rock and create a crater
Impactor diameter	Kinetic energy at		Crater diameter	Frequency (years)
Impactor diameter	atmospheric entry	impact	Crater diameter	Frequency (years)
100 m (330 ft)	47 Mt	3.4 Mt	1.2 km (0.75 mi)	5,200
130 m (430 ft)	103 Mt	31.4 Mt	2 km (1.2 mi)	11,000
150 m (490 ft)	159 Mt	71.5 Mt	2.4 km (1.5 mi)	16,000
200 m (660 ft)	376 Mt	261 Mt	3 km (1.9 mi)	36,000
250 m (820 ft)	734 Mt	598 Mt	3.8 km (2.4 mi)	59,000
300 m (980 ft)	1270 Mt	1110 Mt	4.6 km (2.9 mi)	73,000
400 m (1,300 ft)	3010 Mt	2800 Mt	6 km (3.7 mi)	100,000
700 m (2,300 ft)	16100 Mt	15700 Mt	10 km (6.2 mi)	190,000
1,000 m (3,300 ft)	47000 Mt	46300 Mt	13.6 km (8.5 mi)	440,000
Based on ρ = 2600 kg/m^{3}; v = 17 km/s; and an angle of 45°

Objects with a diameter less than 1 m (3.3 ft) are called meteoroids and seldom make it to the ground to become meteorites. An estimated 500 meteorites reach the surface each year, but only 5 or 6 of these typically create a weather radar signature with a strewn field large enough to be recovered and be made known to scientists.

The late Eugene Shoemaker of the U.S. Geological Survey estimated the rate of Earth impacts, concluding that an event about the size of the nuclear weapon that destroyed Hiroshima occurs about once a year. Such events would seem to be spectacularly obvious, but they generally go unnoticed for a number of reasons: the majority of the Earth's surface is covered by water; a good portion of the land surface is uninhabited; and the explosions generally occur at relatively high altitude, resulting in a huge flash and thunderclap but no real damage.

Although no human is known to have been killed directly by an impact, over 1000 people were injured by the Chelyabinsk meteor airburst event over Russia in 2013. In 2005 it was estimated that the chance of a single person born today dying of an impact is around 1 in 200,000 (due to the potential for a single event killing a large fraction of the world population). The two to four-meter-sized asteroids 2008 TC3, 2014 AA, 2018 LA, 2019 MO, 2022 EB5, and the suspected artificial satellite WT1190F are the only known objects to be detected before impacting the Earth.

Air bursts have been recognized as a significant impact threat by the planetary defense community since at least 2010, when the National Academy of Sciences, citing Boslough and Crawford, recommended that "Because recent studies of meteor airbursts have suggested that near-Earth objects as small as 30 to 50 meters in diameter could be highly destructive, surveys should attempt to detect as many 30- to 50-meter-diameter objects as possible."

=== Geological significance ===
Impacts have had, during the history of the Earth, a significant geological and climatic influence.

The Moon's existence is widely attributed to a huge impact early in Earth's history. Impact events earlier in the history of Earth have been credited with creative as well as destructive events; it has been proposed that impacting comets delivered the Earth's water, and some have suggested that the origins of life may have been influenced by impacting objects by bringing organic chemicals or lifeforms to the Earth's surface, a theory known as exogenesis.

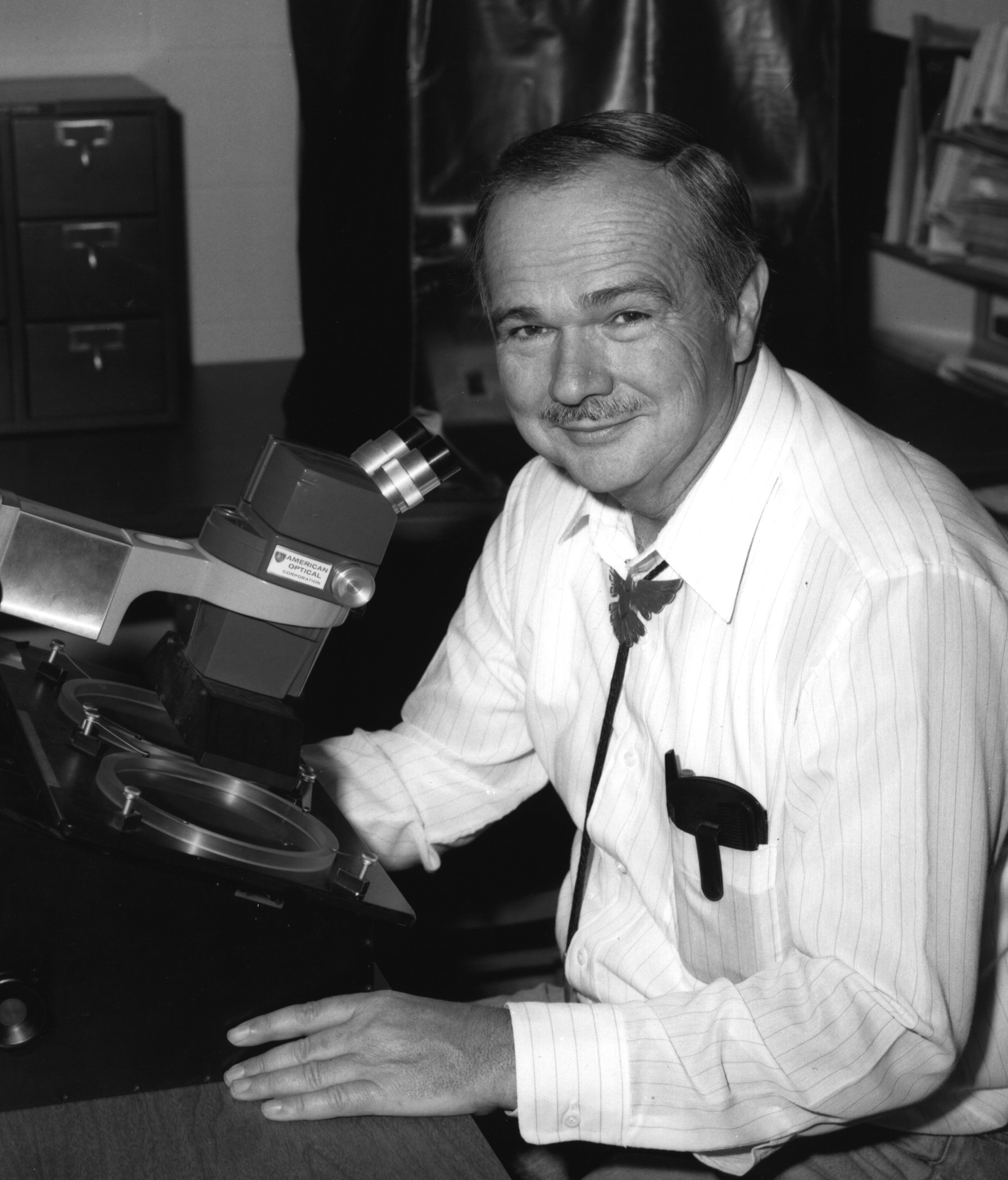
Eugene Merle Shoemaker was first to prove that meteorite impacts have affected the Earth.

These modified views of Earth's history did not emerge until relatively recently, chiefly due to a lack of direct observations and the difficulty in recognizing the signs of an Earth impact because of erosion and weathering. Large-scale terrestrial impacts of the sort that produced the Barringer Crater, locally known as Meteor Crater, east of Flagstaff, Arizona, are rare. Instead, it was widely thought that cratering was the result of volcanism: the Barringer Crater, for example, was ascribed to a prehistoric volcanic explosion (not an unreasonable hypothesis, given that the volcanic San Francisco Peaks stand only 48 km or 30 mi to the west). Similarly, the craters on the surface of the Moon were ascribed to volcanism.

It was not until 1903–1905 that the Barringer Crater was correctly identified as an impact crater, and it was not until as recently as 1963 that research by Eugene Merle Shoemaker conclusively proved this hypothesis. The findings of late 20th-century space exploration and the work of scientists such as Shoemaker demonstrated that impact cratering was by far the most widespread geological process at work on the Solar System's solid bodies. Every surveyed solid body in the Solar System was found to be cratered, and there was no reason to believe that the Earth had somehow escaped bombardment from space. In the last few decades of the 20th century, a large number of highly modified impact craters began to be identified. The first direct observation of a major impact event occurred in 1994: the collision of the comet Shoemaker-Levy 9 with Jupiter.

Based on crater formation rates determined from the Earth's closest celestial partner, the Moon, astrogeologists have determined that during the last 600 million years, the Earth has been struck by 60 objects of a diameter of 5 km (3 mi) or more. The smallest of these impactors would leave a crater almost 100 km (60 mi) across. Only three confirmed craters from that time period with that size or greater have been found: Chicxulub, Popigai, and Manicouagan, and all three have been suspected of being linked to extinction events though only Chicxulub, the largest of the three, has been consistently considered. The impact that caused Mistastin crater generated temperatures exceeding 2,370 °C, the highest known to have occurred on the surface of the Earth.

Besides the direct effect of asteroid impacts on a planet's surface topography, global climate and life, recent studies have shown that several consecutive impacts might have an effect on the dynamo mechanism at a planet's core responsible for maintaining the magnetic field of the planet, and may have contributed to Mars' lack of current magnetic field. An impact event may cause a mantle plume (volcanism) at the antipodal point of the impact. The Chicxulub impact may have increased volcanism at mid-ocean ridges and has been proposed to have triggered flood basalt volcanism at the Deccan Traps.

While numerous impact craters have been confirmed on land or in the shallow seas over continental shelves, no impact craters in the deep ocean have been widely accepted by the scientific community. Impacts of projectiles as large as one km in diameter are generally thought to explode before reaching the sea floor, but it is unknown what would happen if a much larger impactor struck the deep ocean. The lack of a crater, however, does not mean that an ocean impact would not have dangerous implications for humanity. Some scholars have argued that an impact event in an ocean or sea may create a megatsunami, which can cause destruction both at sea and on land along the coast, but this is disputed. The Eltanin impact into the Pacific Ocean 2.5 Mya is thought to involve an object about 1 to 4 kilometres (0.62 to 2.49 mi) across but remains craterless.

=== Biospheric effects ===
The effect of impact events on the biosphere has been the subject of scientific debate. Several theories of impact-related mass extinction have been developed. In the past 500 million years there have been five generally accepted major mass extinctions that on average extinguished half of all species. One of the largest mass extinctions to have affected life on Earth was the Permian-Triassic, which ended the Permian period 250 million years ago and killed off 90 percent of all species; life on Earth took 30 million years to recover. The cause of the Permian-Triassic extinction is still a matter of debate; the age and origin of proposed impact craters, i.e. the Bedout High structure, hypothesized to be associated with it are still controversial. The last such mass extinction led to the demise of the non-avian dinosaurs and coincided with a large meteorite impact; this is the Cretaceous–Paleogene extinction event (also known as the K–T or K–Pg extinction event), which occurred 66 million years ago. There is no definitive evidence of impacts leading to the three other major mass extinctions.

In 1980, physicist Luis Alvarez; his son, geologist Walter Alvarez; and nuclear chemists Frank Asaro and Helen V. Michael from the University of California, Berkeley discovered unusually high concentrations of iridium in a specific layer of rock strata in the Earth's crust. Iridium is an element that is rare on Earth but relatively abundant in many meteorites. From the amount and distribution of iridium present in the 65-million-year-old "iridium layer", the Alvarez team later estimated that an asteroid of 10 to 14 km (6 to 9 mi) must have collided with Earth. This iridium layer at the Cretaceous–Paleogene boundary has been found worldwide at 100 different sites. Multidirectionally shocked quartz (coesite), which is normally associated with large impact events or atomic bomb explosions, has also been found in the same layer at more than 30 sites. Soot and ash at levels tens of thousands times normal levels were found with the above.

Anomalies in chromium isotopic ratios found within the K-T boundary layer strongly support the impact theory. Chromium isotopic ratios are homogeneous within the earth, and therefore these isotopic anomalies exclude a volcanic origin, which has also been proposed as a cause for the iridium enrichment. Further, the chromium isotopic ratios measured in the K-T boundary are similar to the chromium isotopic ratios found in carbonaceous chondrites. Thus a probable candidate for the impactor is a carbonaceous asteroid, but a comet is also possible because comets are assumed to consist of material similar to carbonaceous chondrites.

Probably the most convincing evidence for a worldwide catastrophe was the discovery of the crater which has since been named Chicxulub Crater. This crater is centered on the Yucatán Peninsula of Mexico and was discovered by Tony Camargo and Glen Penfield while working as geophysicists for the Mexican oil company PEMEX. What they reported as a circular feature later turned out to be a crater estimated to be 180 km (110 mi) in diameter. This convinced the vast majority of scientists that this extinction resulted from a point event that is most probably an extraterrestrial impact and not from increased volcanism and climate change (which would spread its main effect over a much longer time period).

Although there is now general agreement that there was a huge impact at the end of the Cretaceous that led to the iridium enrichment of the K-T boundary layer, remnants have been found of other, smaller impacts, some nearing half the size of the Chicxulub crater, which did not result in any mass extinctions, and there is no clear linkage between an impact and any other incident of mass extinction.

Paleontologists David M. Raup and Jack Sepkoski have proposed that an excess of extinction events occurs roughly every 26 million years (though many are relatively minor). This led physicist Richard A. Muller to suggest that these extinctions could be due to a hypothetical companion star to the Sun called Nemesis periodically disrupting the orbits of comets in the Oort cloud, leading to a large increase in the number of comets reaching the inner Solar System where they might hit Earth. Physicist Adrian Melott and paleontologist Richard Bambach have more recently verified the Raup and Sepkoski finding, but argue that it is not consistent with the characteristics expected of a Nemesis-style periodicity.

=== Sociological and cultural effects ===
An impact event is commonly seen as a scenario that would bring about the end of civilization. In 2000, Discover magazine published a list of 20 possible sudden doomsday scenarios with an impact event listed as the most likely to occur.

A joint Pew Research Center/Smithsonian survey from April 21 to 26, 2010 found that 31 percent of Americans believed that an asteroid will collide with Earth by 2050. A majority (61 percent) disagreed.

=== Earth impacts in history ===
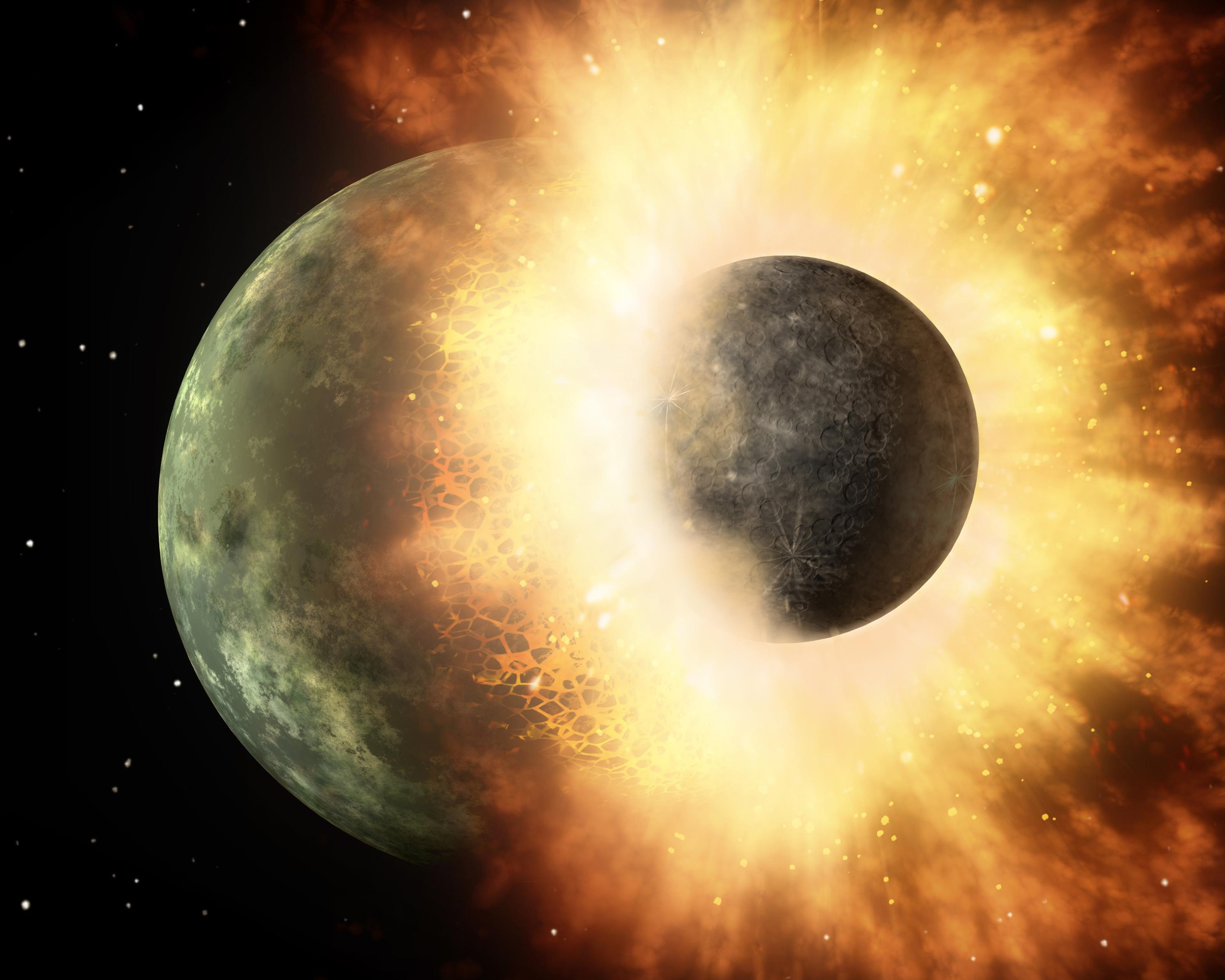
Artist's depiction of a collision between two planetary bodies. Such an impact between the Earth and a Mars-sized object likely formed the Moon.

In the early history of the Earth (about four billion years ago), bolide impacts were almost certainly common since the Solar System contained far more discrete bodies than at present. Such impacts could have included strikes by asteroids hundreds of kilometers in diameter, with explosions so powerful that they vaporized all the Earth's oceans. It was not until this heavy bombardment slackened that life appears to have begun to evolve on Earth.

==== Precambrian ====
The leading theory of the Moon's origin is the giant-impact hypothesis, which postulates that Earth was once hit by a planetoid the size of Mars; such a theory is able to explain the size and composition of the Moon, something not done by other theories of lunar formation.

According to the theory of the Late Heavy Bombardment, there should have been 22,000 or more impact craters with diameters >20 km (12 mi), about 40 impact basins with diameters about 1,000 km (620 mi), and several impact basins with diameters about 5,000 km (3,100 mi). However, hundreds of millions of years of deformation at the Earth's crust pose significant challenges to conclusively identifying impacts from this period. Only two pieces of pristine lithosphere are believed to remain from this era: Kaapvaal craton (in contemporary South Africa) and Pilbara Craton (in contemporary Western Australia) to search within which may potentially reveal evidence in the form of physical craters. Other methods may be used to identify impacts from this period, for example, indirect gravitational or magnetic analysis of the mantle, but may prove inconclusive.

In 2021, evidence for a probable impact 3.46 billion-years ago at Pilbara Craton has been found in the form of a 150 kilometres (93 mi) crater created by the impact of a 10 kilometres (6.2 mi) asteroid (named "The Apex Asteroid") into the sea at a depth of 2.5 kilometres (1.6 mi) (near the site of Marble Bar, Western Australia). The event caused global tsunamis. It is also coincidental to some of the earliest evidence of life on Earth, fossilized Stromatolites.

Evidence for at least 4 impact events have been found in spherule layers (dubbed S1 through S8) from the Barberton Greenstone Belt in South Africa, spanning around 3.5–3.2 billion years ago. The sites of the impacts are thought to have been distant from the location of the belt. The impactors that generated these events are thought to have been much larger than those that created the largest known still existing craters/impact structures on Earth, with the impactors having estimated diameters of ~20–50 kilometres (12–31 mi), with the craters generated by these impacts having an estimated diameter of 400–1,000 kilometres (250–620 mi). The largest impacts like those represented by the S2 layer are likely to have had far-reaching effects, such as the boiling of the surface layer of the oceans. A review in 2024, presenting the state of the art of the most ancient and larger impact on Earth during the archean era, show a total of 36 layers deposited between 3.47–3.22 Ga and 2.63–2.49 Ga in a "tail" of the late heavy bombardment and as evidence of it on Earth; the dichotomy in the age could be represent a simple gap or a peak of the meteorite flux. Considering the possible presence of duplicates, 15 ± 4 "basin-forming" impacts (so far larger than Chicxulub) and 68 ± 8 Chicxulub-scale impacts are expected by models, but it is clear the record is incomplete, both because very large impacts create more melt than shocked rocks, raising preservation issues, and because the Earth is geologically active.

The Maniitsoq structure, dated to around 3 billion years old (3 Ga), was once thought to be the result of an impact; however, follow-up studies have not confirmed its nature as an impact structure. The Maniitsoq structure is not recognised as an impact structure by the Earth Impact Database.

In 2020, scientists discovered the world's oldest confirmed impact crater, the Yarrabubba crater, caused by an impact that occurred in Yilgarn craton (what is now Western Australia), dated at more than 2.2 billion years ago with the impactor estimated to be around 7 kilometres (4.3 mi) wide. It is believed that, at this time, the Earth was mostly or completely frozen, commonly called the Huronian glaciation.

The Vredefort impact event, which occurred around 2 billion years ago in Kaapvaal craton (what is now South Africa), caused the largest verified crater, a multi-ringed structure 160–300 km (100–200 mi) across, forming from an impactor approximately 10–15 km (6.2–9.3 mi) in diameter.

The Sudbury impact event occurred on the Nuna supercontinent (now Canada) from a bolide approximately 10–15 km (6.2–9.3 mi) in diameter approximately 1.849 billion years ago Debris from the event would have been scattered across the globe.

==== Paleozoic and Mesozoic ====
Two 10-kilometre sized (6.2 mi) asteroids may have struck Australia between 360 and 300 million years ago at the West Warburton and East Warburton Basins, creating a 400-kilometre impact zone (250 mi). According to evidence found in 2015, it would be the largest ever recorded. A third, possible impact was also identified in 2015 to the north, on the upper Diamantina River, also believed to have been caused by an asteroid 10 km across about 300 million years ago, but further studies are needed to establish that this crustal anomaly was indeed the result of an impact event.

An animation modelling the impact, and subsequent crater formation of the Chicxulub impact (University of Arizona, Space Imagery Center)

The prehistoric Chicxulub impact, 66 million years ago, believed to be the cause of the Cretaceous–Paleogene extinction event, was caused by an asteroid estimated to be about 10 kilometres (6.2 mi) wide.

==== Cenozoic ====
===== Paleogene =====
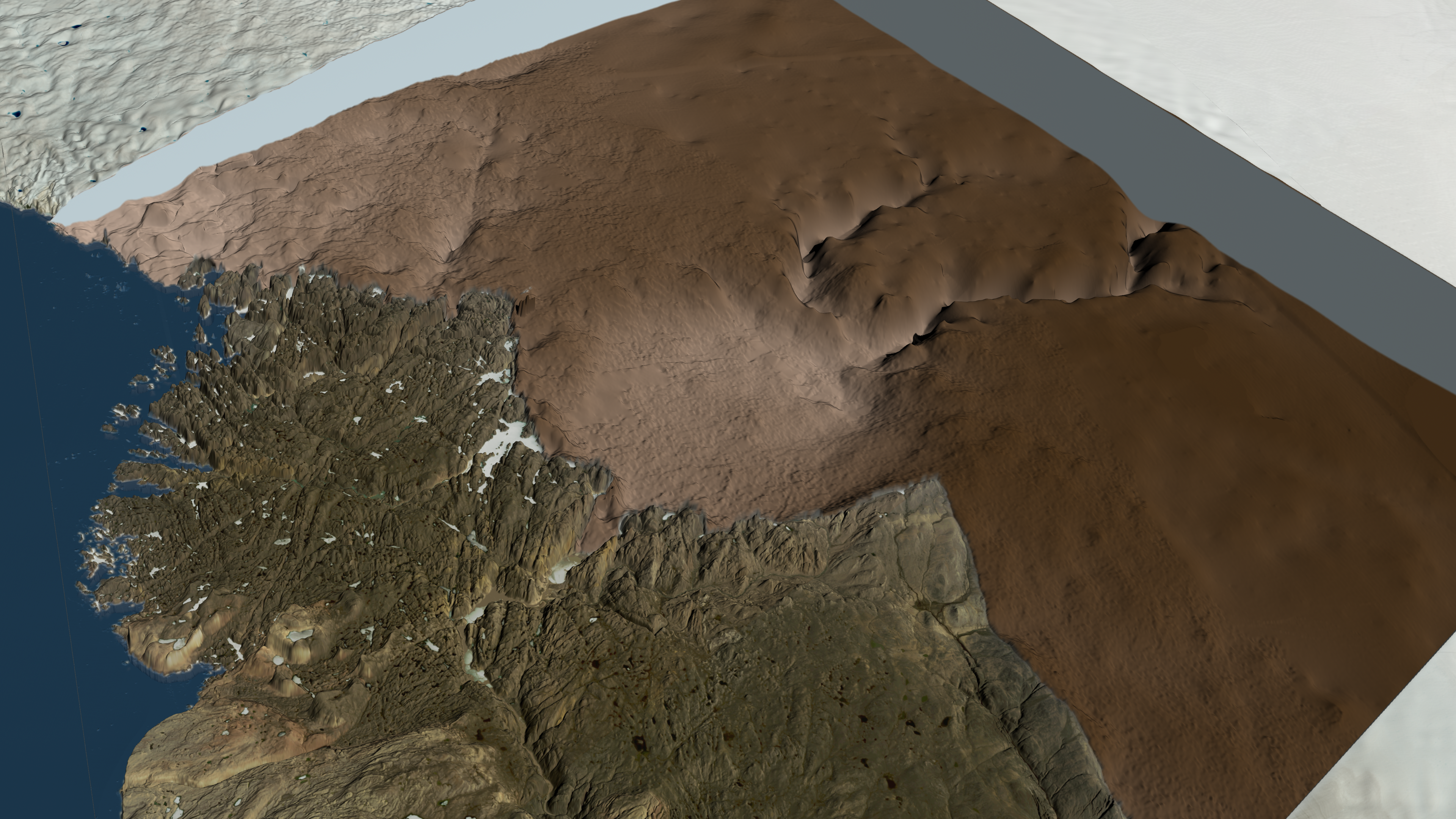
The Hiawatha impact crater in Greenland is buried under more than a kilometre of ice

Analysis of the Hiawatha Glacier reveals the presence of a 31 km wide impact crater dated at 58 million years of age, less than 10 million years after the Cretaceous–Paleogene extinction event, scientists believe that the impactor was a metallic asteroid with a diameter in the order of 1.5 kilometres (0.93 miles). The impact would have had global effects.

===== Pleistocene =====
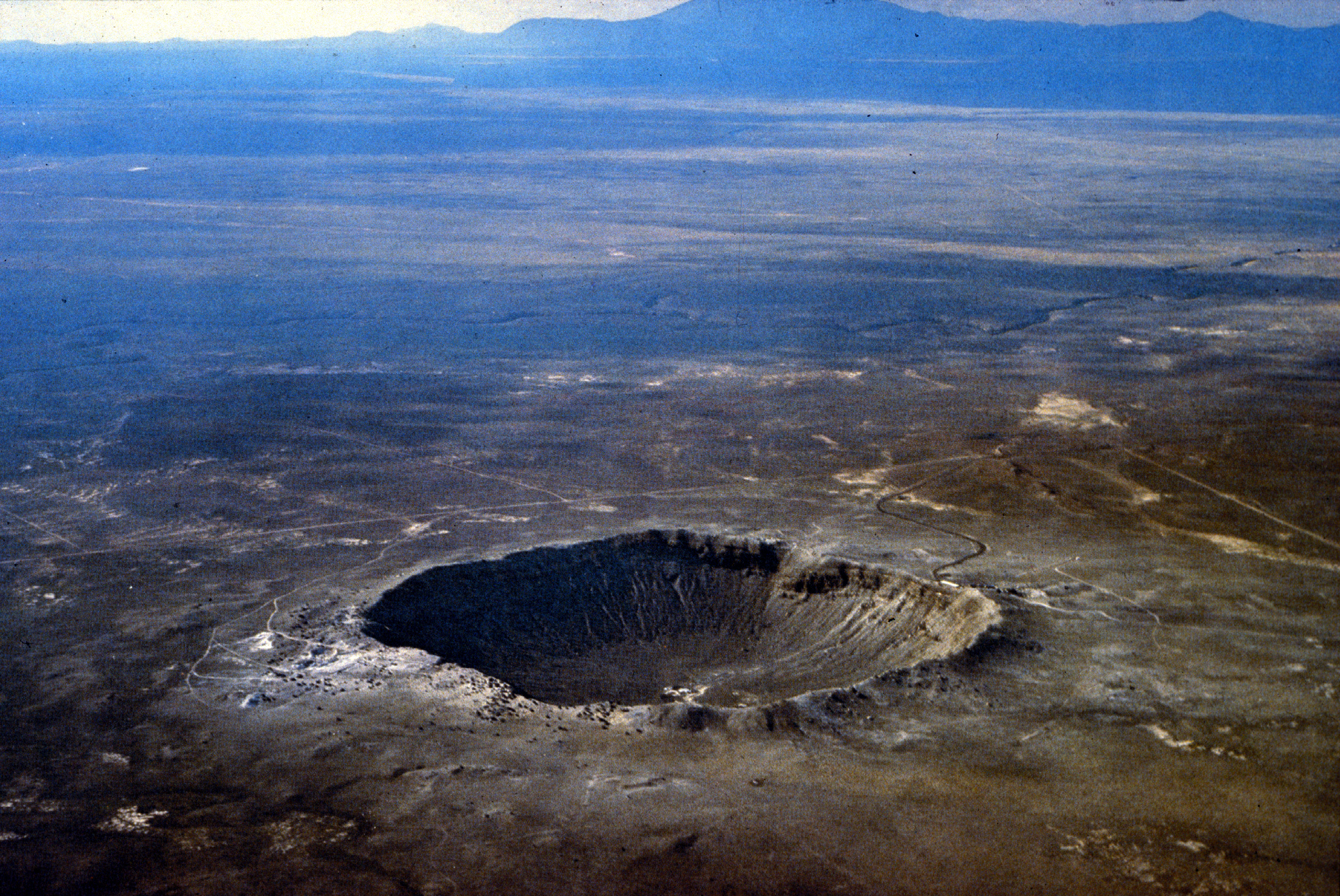
Aerial view of Barringer Crater in Arizona

Artifacts recovered with tektites from the 803,000-year-old Australasian strewnfield event in Asia link a Homo erectus population to a significant meteorite impact and its aftermath. Significant examples of Pleistocene impacts include the Lonar crater lake in India, approximately 52,000 years old (though a study published in 2010 gives a much greater age), which now has a flourishing semi-tropical jungle around it.

===== Holocene =====
The Rio Cuarto craters in Argentina were produced approximately 10,000 years ago, at the beginning of the Holocene. If proved to be impact craters, they would be the first impact of the Holocene.

The Campo del Cielo ("Field of Heaven") refers to an area bordering Argentina's Chaco Province where a group of iron meteorites were found, estimated as dating to 4,000–5,000 years ago. It first came to attention of Spanish authorities in 1576; in 2015, police arrested four alleged smugglers trying to steal more than a ton of protected meteorites. The Henbury craters in Australia (~5,000 years old) and Kaali craters in Estonia (~2,700 years old) were apparently produced by objects that broke up before impact.

Whitecourt crater in Alberta, Canada is estimated to be between 1,080 and 1,130 years old. The crater is approximately 36 metres (118 feet) in diameter and 9 metres (30 feet) deep, is heavily forested and was discovered in 2007 when a metal detector revealed fragments of meteoric iron scattered around the area.

A Chinese record states that 10,000 people were killed in the 1490 Qingyang event with the deaths caused by a hail of "falling stones"; some astronomers hypothesize that this may describe an actual meteorite fall, although they find the number of deaths implausible.

Kamil Crater, discovered from Google Earth image review in Egypt, 45 m (148 ft) in diameter and 10 m (33 ft) deep, is thought to have been formed less than 3,500 years ago in a then-unpopulated region of western Egypt. It was found February 19, 2009 by V. de Michelle on a Google Earth image of the East Uweinat Desert, Egypt.

==== 20th-century impacts ====
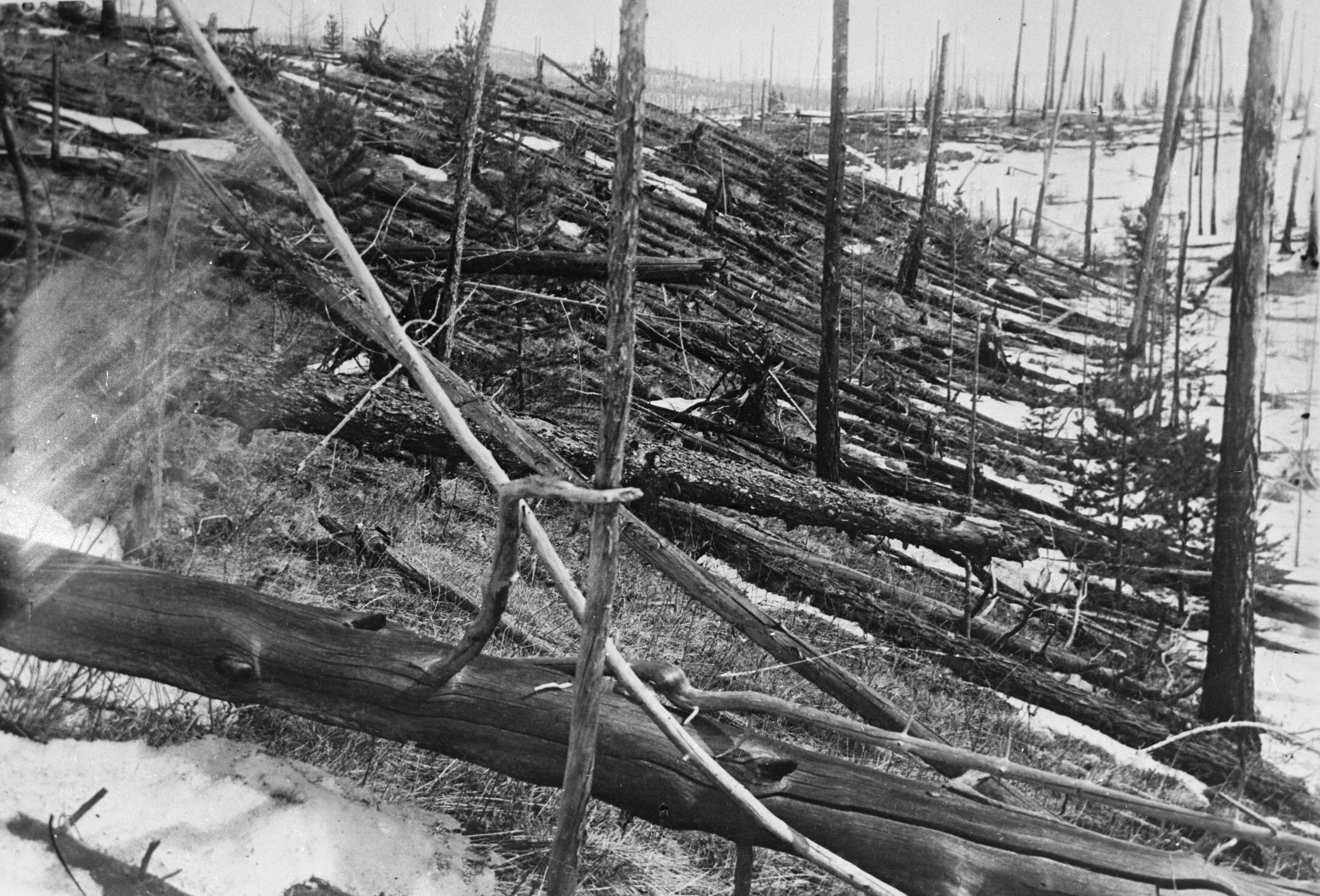
Trees knocked over by the Tunguska blast

One of the best-known recorded impacts in modern times was the Tunguska event, which occurred in Siberia, Russia, in 1908. This incident involved an explosion that was probably caused by the airburst of an asteroid or comet 5 to 10 km (3.1 to 6.2 mi) above the Earth's surface, felling an estimated 30 million trees over a 2,150 km^{2} (830 sq mi) area.

In February 1947, another large bolide impacted the Earth in the Sikhote-Alin Mountains, Primorye, Soviet Union. It was during daytime hours and was witnessed by many people, which allowed V. G. Fesenkov, then chairman of the meteorite committee of the USSR Academy of Science, to estimate the meteoroid's orbit before it encountered the Earth. Sikhote-Alin is a massive fall with the overall size of the meteoroid estimated at 90,000 kg (200,000 lb). A more recent estimate by Tsvetkov (and others) puts the mass at around 100,000 kg (220,000 lb). It was an iron meteorite belonging to the chemical group IIAB and with a coarse octahedrite structure. More than 70 tonnes (metric tons) of material survived the collision.

A case of a human injured by a space rock occurred on November 30, 1954, in Sylacauga, Alabama. There a 4 kg (8.8 lb) stone chondrite crashed through a roof and hit Ann Hodges in her living room after it bounced off her radio. She was badly bruised by the fragments. Several persons have since claimed to have been struck by "meteorites" but no verifiable meteorites have resulted.

A small number of meteorite falls have been observed with automated cameras and recovered following calculation of the impact point. The first was the Příbram meteorite, which fell in Czechoslovakia (now the Czech Republic) in 1959. In this case, two cameras used to photograph meteors captured images of the fireball. The images were used both to determine the location of the stones on the ground and, more significantly, to calculate for the first time an accurate orbit for a recovered meteorite.

Following the Příbram fall, other nations established automated observing programs aimed at studying infalling meteorites. One of these was the Prairie Meteorite Network, operated by the Smithsonian Astrophysical Observatory from 1963 to 1975 in the midwestern U.S. This program also observed a meteorite fall, the "Lost City" chondrite, allowing its recovery and a calculation of its orbit. Another program in Canada, the Meteorite Observation and Recovery Project, ran from 1971 to 1985. It too recovered a single meteorite, "Innisfree", in 1977. Finally, observations by the European Fireball Network, a descendant of the original Czech program that recorded Příbram and Ischgl meteorite falls, led to the discovery and orbit calculations for the Neuschwanstein meteorite in 2002.

On August 10, 1972, a meteor which became known as the 1972 Great Daylight Fireball was witnessed by many people as it moved north over the Rocky Mountains from the U.S. Southwest to Canada. It was filmed by a tourist at the Grand Teton National Park in Wyoming with an 8-millimeter color movie camera. In size range the object was roughly between a car and a house, and while it could have ended its life in a Hiroshima-sized blast, there was never any explosion. Analysis of the trajectory indicated that it never came much lower than 58 km (36 mi) off the ground, and the conclusion was that it had grazed Earth's atmosphere for about 100 seconds, then skipped back out of the atmosphere and returned to its orbit around the Sun.

Many impact events occur without being observed by anyone on the ground. Between 1975 and 1992, American missile early warning satellites picked up 136 major explosions in the upper atmosphere. In the November 21, 2002, edition of the journal Nature, Peter Brown of the University of Western Ontario reported on his study of U.S. early warning satellite records for the preceding eight years. He identified 300 flashes caused by 1 to 10 m (3 to 33 ft) meteors in that time period and estimated the rate of Tunguska-sized events as once in 400 years. Eugene Shoemaker estimated that an event of such magnitude occurs about once every 300 years, though more recent analyses have suggested he may have overestimated by an order of magnitude.

In the dark morning hours of January 18, 2000, a fireball exploded over the city of Whitehorse, Yukon Territory at an altitude of about 26 km (16 mi), lighting up the night like day. The meteor that produced the fireball was estimated to be about 4.6 m (15 ft) in diameter, with a weight of 180 tonnes. This blast was also featured on the Science Channel series Killer Asteroids, with several witness reports from residents in Atlin, British Columbia.

==== 21st-century impacts ====
On 7 June 2006, a meteor was observed striking a location in the Reisadalen valley in Nordreisa Municipality in Troms County, Norway. Although initial witness reports stated that the resultant fireball was equivalent to the Hiroshima nuclear explosion, scientific analysis places the force of the blast at anywhere from 100 to 500 tonnes TNT equivalent, around three percent of Hiroshima's yield.

On 15 September 2007, a chondritic meteor crashed near the village of Carancas in southeastern Peru near Lake Titicaca, leaving a water-filled hole and spewing gases across the surrounding area. Many residents became ill, apparently from the noxious gases shortly after the impact.

On 7 October 2008, an approximately 4 meter asteroid labeled 2008 TC3 was tracked for 20 hours as it approached Earth and as it fell through the atmosphere and impacted in Sudan. This was the first time an object was detected before it reached the atmosphere and hundreds of pieces of the meteorite were recovered from the Nubian Desert.

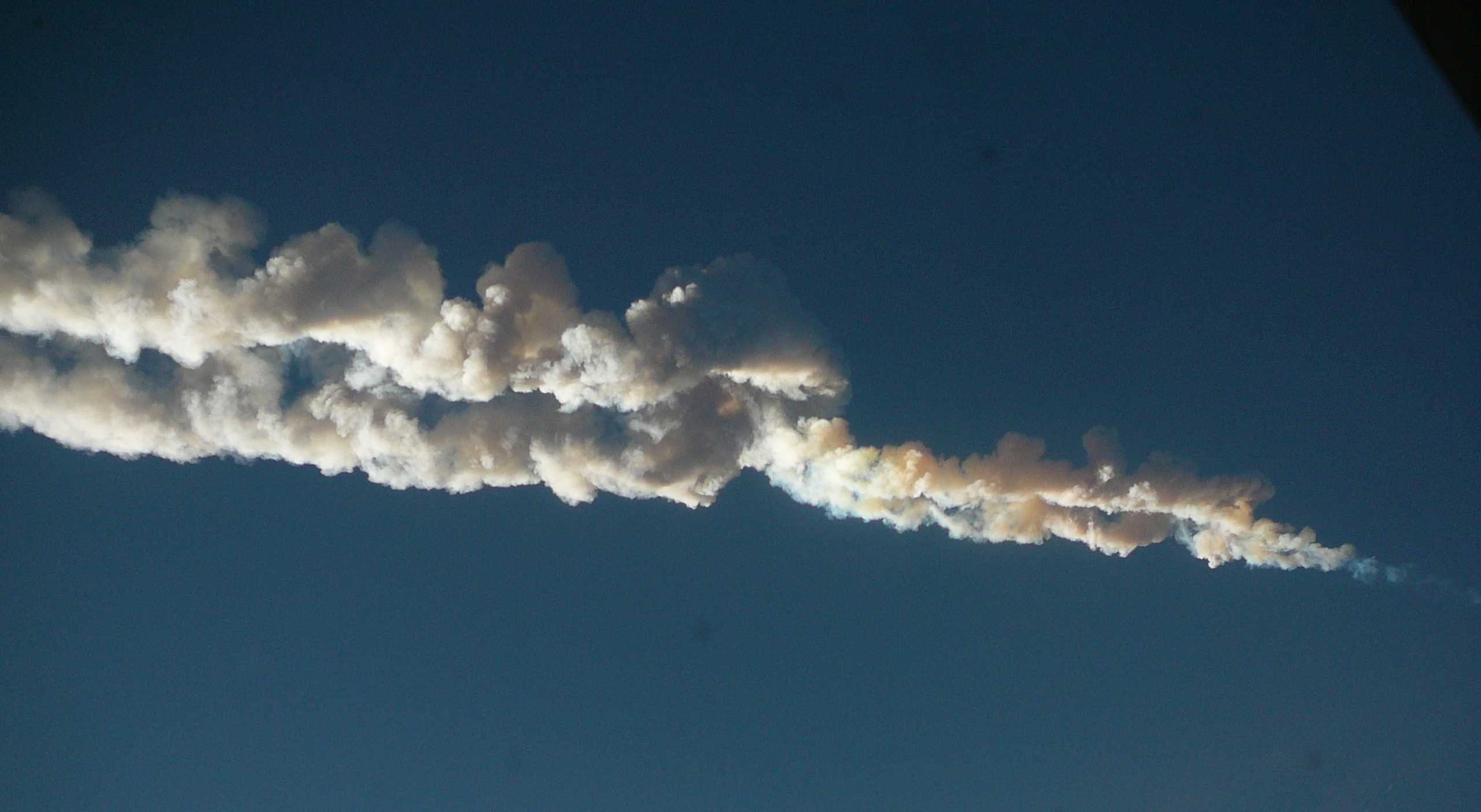
Trail left by the exploding Chelyabinsk meteor as it passed over the city.

On 15 February 2013, an asteroid entered Earth's atmosphere over Russia as a fireball and exploded above the city of Chelyabinsk during its passage through the Ural Mountains region at 09:13 YEKT (03:13 UTC). The object's air burst occurred at an altitude between 30 and 50 km (19 and 31 mi) above the ground, and about 1,500 people were injured, mainly by broken window glass shattered by the shock wave. Two were reported in serious condition; however, there were no fatalities. Initially some 3,000 buildings in six cities across the region were reported damaged due to the explosion's shock wave, a figure which rose to over 7,200 in the following weeks. The Chelyabinsk meteor was estimated to have caused over $30 million in damage. It is the largest recorded object to have encountered the Earth since the 1908 Tunguska event. The meteor is estimated to have an initial diameter of 17–20 metres and a mass of roughly 10,000 tonnes. On 16 October 2013, a team from Ural Federal University led by Victor Grokhovsky recovered a large fragment of the meteor from the bottom of Russia's Lake Chebarkul, about 80 km west of the city.

On 1 January 2014, a 3-meter (9.8-foot) asteroid, 2014 AA was discovered by the Mount Lemmon Survey and observed over the next hour, and was soon found to be on a collision course with Earth. The exact location was uncertain, constrained to a line between Panama, the central Atlantic Ocean, The Gambia, and Ethiopia. Around roughly the time expected (2 January 3:06 UTC) an infrasound burst was detected near the center of the impact range, in the middle of the Atlantic Ocean. This marks the second time a natural object was identified prior to impacting earth after 2008 TC3.

Nearly two years later, on October 3, WT1190F was detected orbiting Earth on a highly eccentric orbit, taking it from well within the Geocentric satellite ring to nearly twice the orbit of the Moon. It was estimated to be perturbed by the Moon onto a collision course with Earth on November 13. With over a month of observations, as well as precovery observations found dating back to 2009, it was found to be far less dense than a natural asteroid should be, suggesting that it was most likely an unidentified artificial satellite. As predicted, it fell over Sri Lanka at 6:18 UTC (11:48 local time). The sky in the region was very overcast, so only an airborne observation team was able to successfully observe it falling above the clouds. It is now thought to be a remnant of the Lunar Prospector mission in 1998, and is the third time any previously unknown object – natural or artificial – was identified prior to impact.

On 22 January 2018, an object, A106fgF, was discovered by the Asteroid Terrestrial-impact Last Alert System (ATLAS) and identified as having a small chance of impacting Earth later that day. As it was very dim, and only identified hours before its approach, no more than the initial 4 observations covering a 39-minute period were made of the object. It is unknown if it impacted Earth or not, but no fireball was detected in either infrared or infrasound, so if it did, it would have been very small, and likely near the eastern end of its potential impact area – in the western Pacific Ocean.

On 2 June 2018, the Mount Lemmon Survey detected 2018 LA (ZLAF9B2), a small 2–5 meter asteroid which further observations soon found had an 85% chance of impacting Earth. Soon after the impact, a fireball report from Botswana arrived to the American Meteor Society. Further observations with ATLAS extended the observation arc from 1 hour to 4 hours and confirmed that the asteroid orbit indeed impacted Earth in southern Africa, fully closing the loop with the fireball report and making this the third natural object confirmed to impact Earth, and the second on land after 2008 TC_{3}.

On 8 March 2019, NASA announced the detection of a large airburst that occurred on 18 December 2018 at 11:48 local time off the eastern coast of the Kamchatka Peninsula. The Kamchatka superbolide is estimated to have had a mass of roughly 1600 tons, and a diameter of 9 to 14 meters depending on its density, making it the third largest asteroid to impact Earth since 1900, after the Chelyabinsk meteor and the Tunguska event. The fireball exploded in an airburst 25.6 kilometres (15.9 mi) above Earth's surface.

2019 MO, an approximately 4m asteroid, was detected by ATLAS a few hours before it impacted the Caribbean Sea near Puerto Rico in June 2019.

In 2023, a small meteorite is believed to have crashed through the roof of a home in Trenton, New Jersey. The metallic rock was approximately 4 inches by 6 inches and weighed 4 pounds. The item was seized by police and tested for radioactivity. The object was later confirmed to be a meteorite by scientists at The College of New Jersey, as well as meteorite expert Jerry Delaney, who previously worked at Rutgers University and the American Museum of Natural History.

On 25 July 2024, the Charlottetown meteorite fell into a backyard in Prince Edward Island, Canada, becoming the first terrestrial impact event recorded on camera and the only impact event with an audio recording.

===== Asteroid impact prediction =====
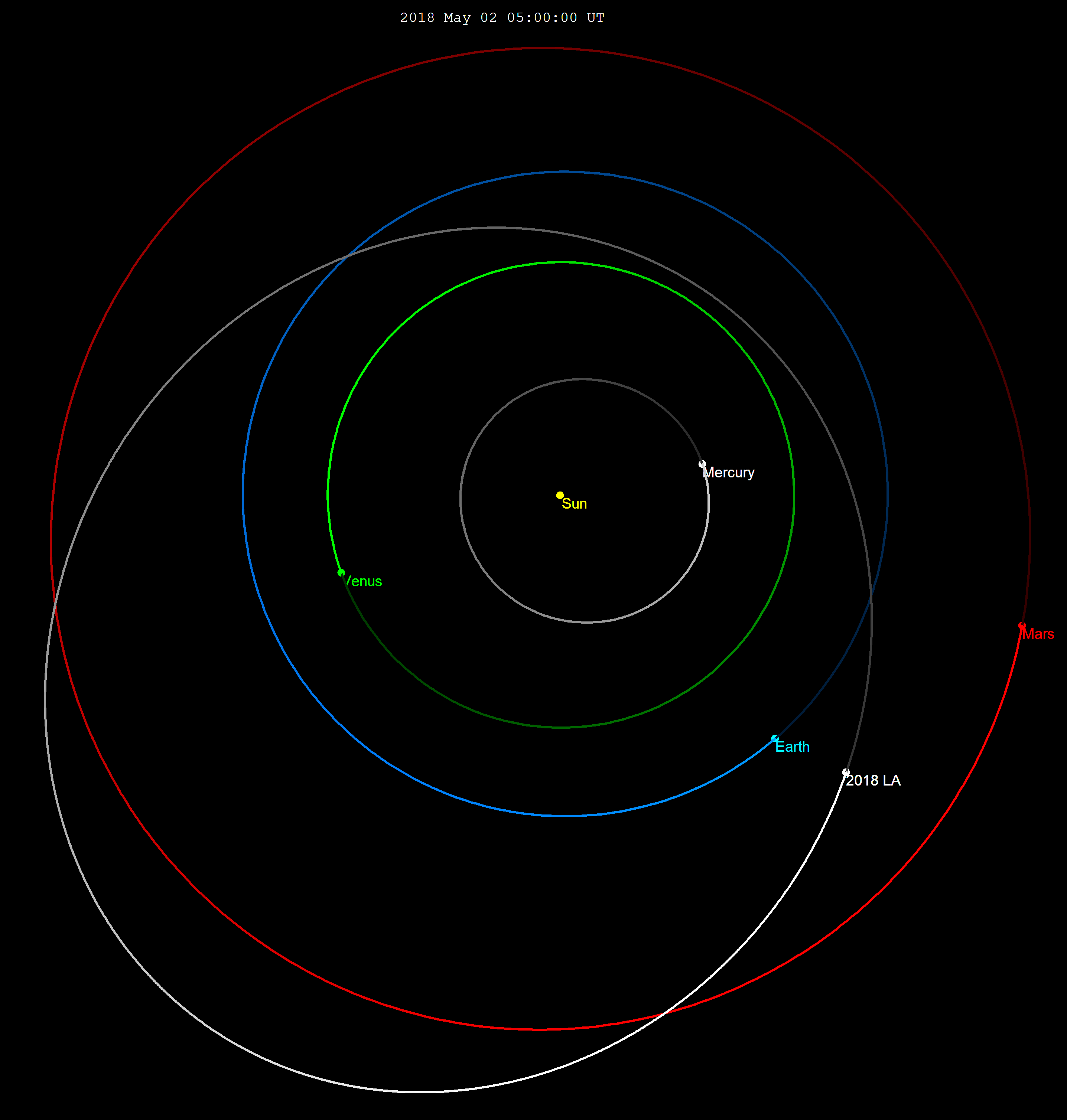
Orbit and positions of 2018 LA and Earth, 30 days before impact. The diagram illustrates how orbit data can be used to predict impacts well in advance. Note that in this particular instance the asteroid's orbit was not known until a few hours before impact. The diagram was constructed afterwards for illustration.

In the late 20th and early 21st century scientists put in place measures to detect Near Earth objects, and predict the dates and times of asteroids impacting Earth, along with the locations at which they will impact. The International Astronomical Union Minor Planet Center (MPC) is the global clearing house for information on asteroid orbits. NASA's Sentry System continually scans the MPC catalog of known asteroids, analyzing their orbits for any possible future impacts. Currently none are predicted (the single highest probability impact currently listed is ~7 m asteroid 2010 RF12, which is due to pass Earth in September 2095 with only a 5% predicted chance of impacting).

Currently prediction is mainly based on cataloging asteroids years before they are due to impact. This works well for larger asteroids (> 1 km across) as they are easily seen from a long distance. Over 95% of them are already known and their orbits have been measured, so any future impacts can be predicted long before they are on their final approach to Earth. Smaller objects are too faint to observe except when they come very close and so most cannot be observed before their final approach. Current mechanisms for detecting asteroids on final approach rely on wide-field ground based telescopes, such as the ATLAS system. However, current telescopes only cover part of the Earth and even more importantly cannot detect asteroids on the day-side of the planet, which is why so few of the smaller asteroids that commonly impact Earth are detected during the few hours that they would be visible. So far only four impact events have been successfully predicted, all from innocuous 2–5 m diameter asteroids and detected a few hours in advance.

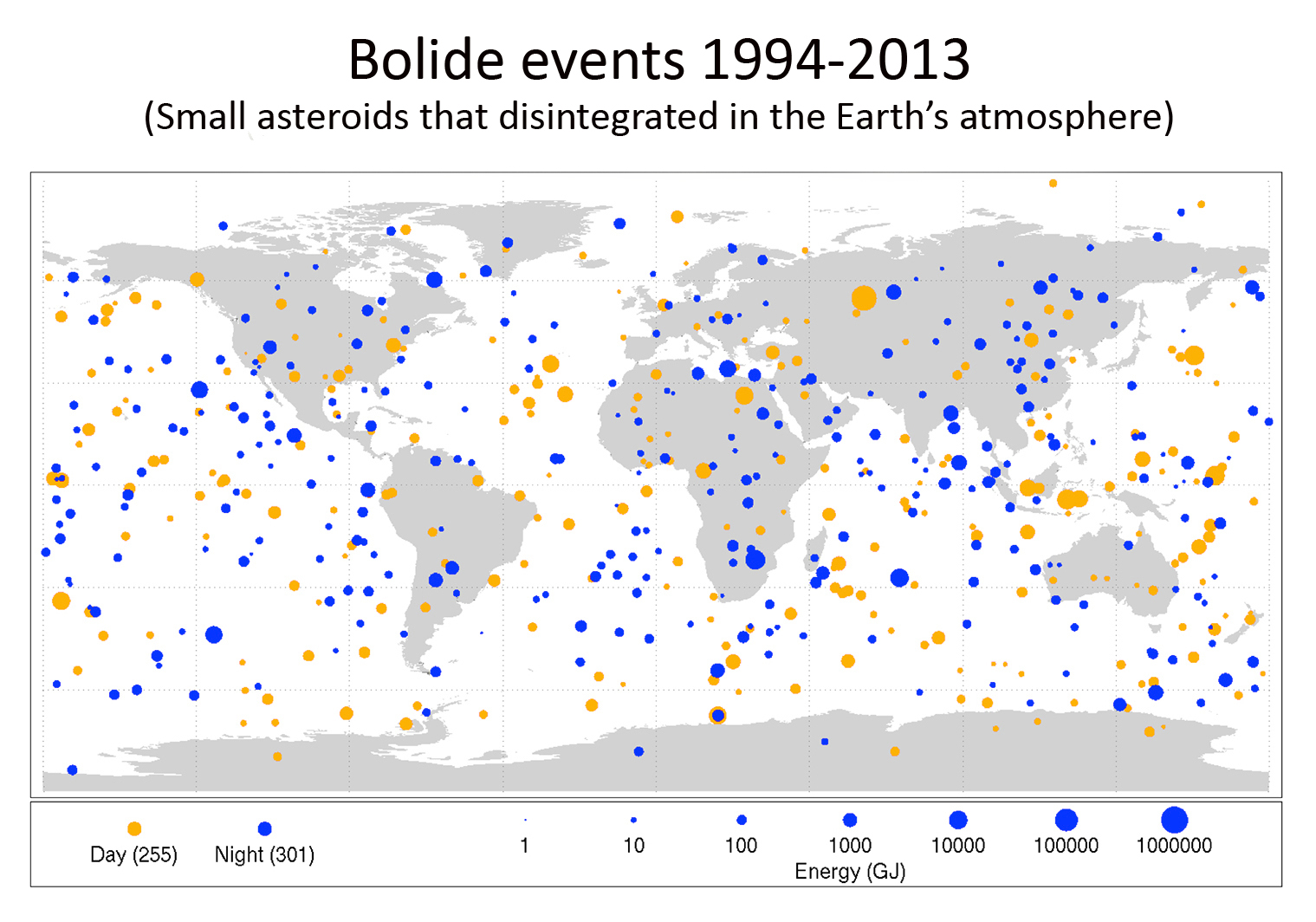
Ground based telescopes can only detect objects approaching on the night-side of the planet, away from the Sun. Roughly half of impacts occur on the day-side of the planet.

=== Current response status ===
In April 2018, the B612 Foundation reported "It's 100 per cent certain we'll be hit [by a devastating asteroid], but we're not 100 per cent certain when." Also in 2018, physicist Stephen Hawking, in his final book Brief Answers to the Big Questions, considered an asteroid collision to be the biggest threat to the planet. In June 2018, the US National Science and Technology Council warned that America is unprepared for an asteroid impact event, and has developed and released the "National Near-Earth Object Preparedness Strategy Action Plan" to better prepare. According to expert testimony in the United States Congress in 2013, NASA would require at least five years of preparation to launch a mission to intercept an asteroid. The preferred method is to deflect rather than disrupt an asteroid.

== Elsewhere in the Solar System ==
=== Evidence of massive past impact events ===
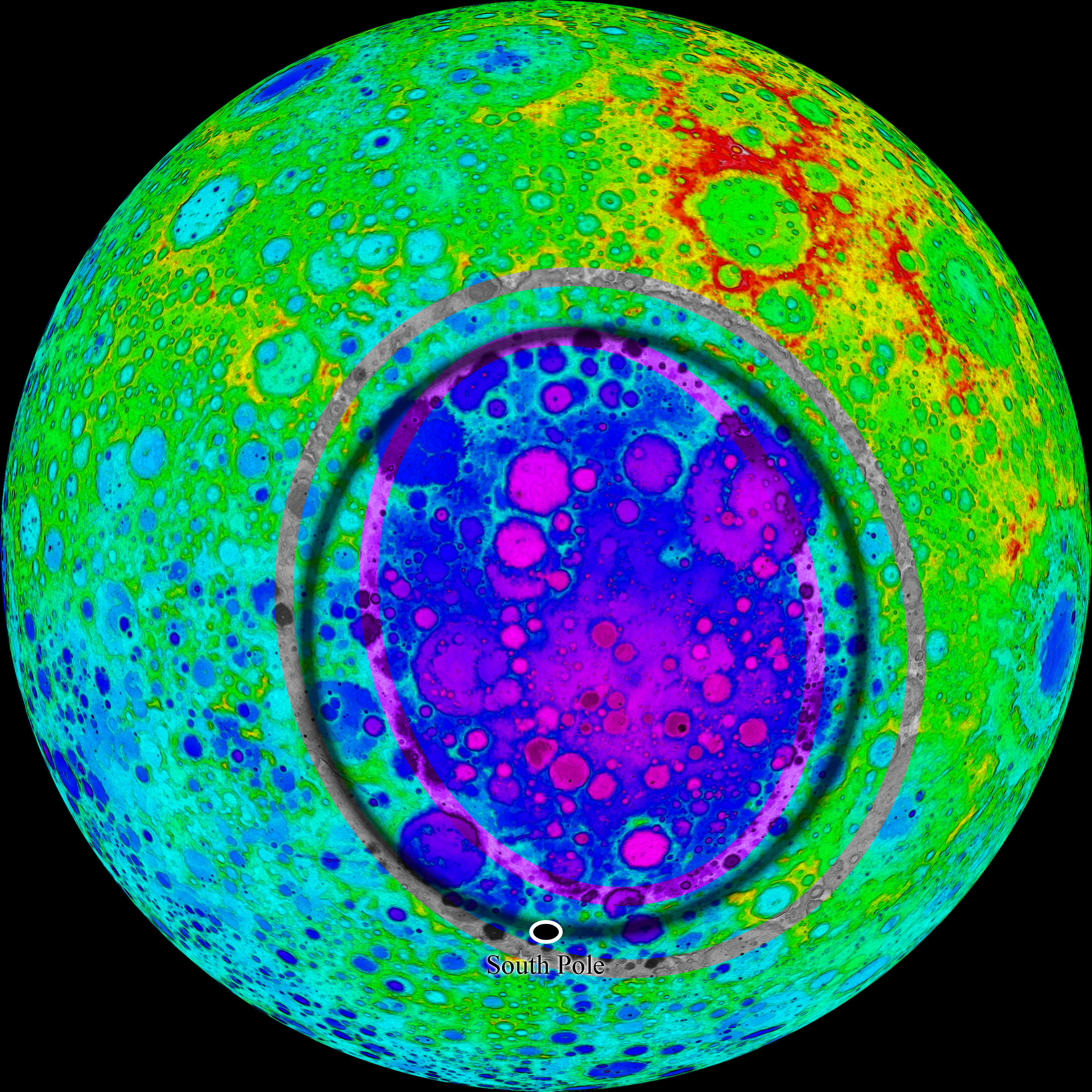
Topographical map of the South Pole–Aitken basin based on Kaguya data provides evidence of a massive impact event on the Moon some 4.3 billion years ago

Impact craters provide evidence of past impacts on other planets in the Solar System, including possible interplanetary terrestrial impacts. Without carbon dating, other points of reference are used to estimate the timing of these impact events. Mars provides some significant evidence of possible interplanetary collisions. The North Polar Basin on Mars is speculated by some to be evidence for a planet-sized impact on the surface of Mars between 3.8 and 3.9 billion years ago, while Utopia Planitia is the largest confirmed impact and Hellas Planitia is the largest visible crater in the Solar System. The Moon provides similar evidence of massive impacts, with the South Pole–Aitken basin being the biggest. Mercury's Caloris Basin is another example of a crater formed by a massive impact event. Rheasilvia on Vesta is an example of a crater formed by an impact capable of, based on ratio of impact to size, severely deforming a planetary-mass object. Impact craters on the moons of Saturn such as Engelier and Gerin on Iapetus, Mamaldi on Rhea and Odysseus on Tethys and Herschel on Mimas form significant surface features. Models developed in 2018 to explain the unusual spin of Uranus support a long-held hypothesis that this was caused by an oblique collision with a massive object twice the size of Earth.

=== Observed events ===
==== Jupiter ====
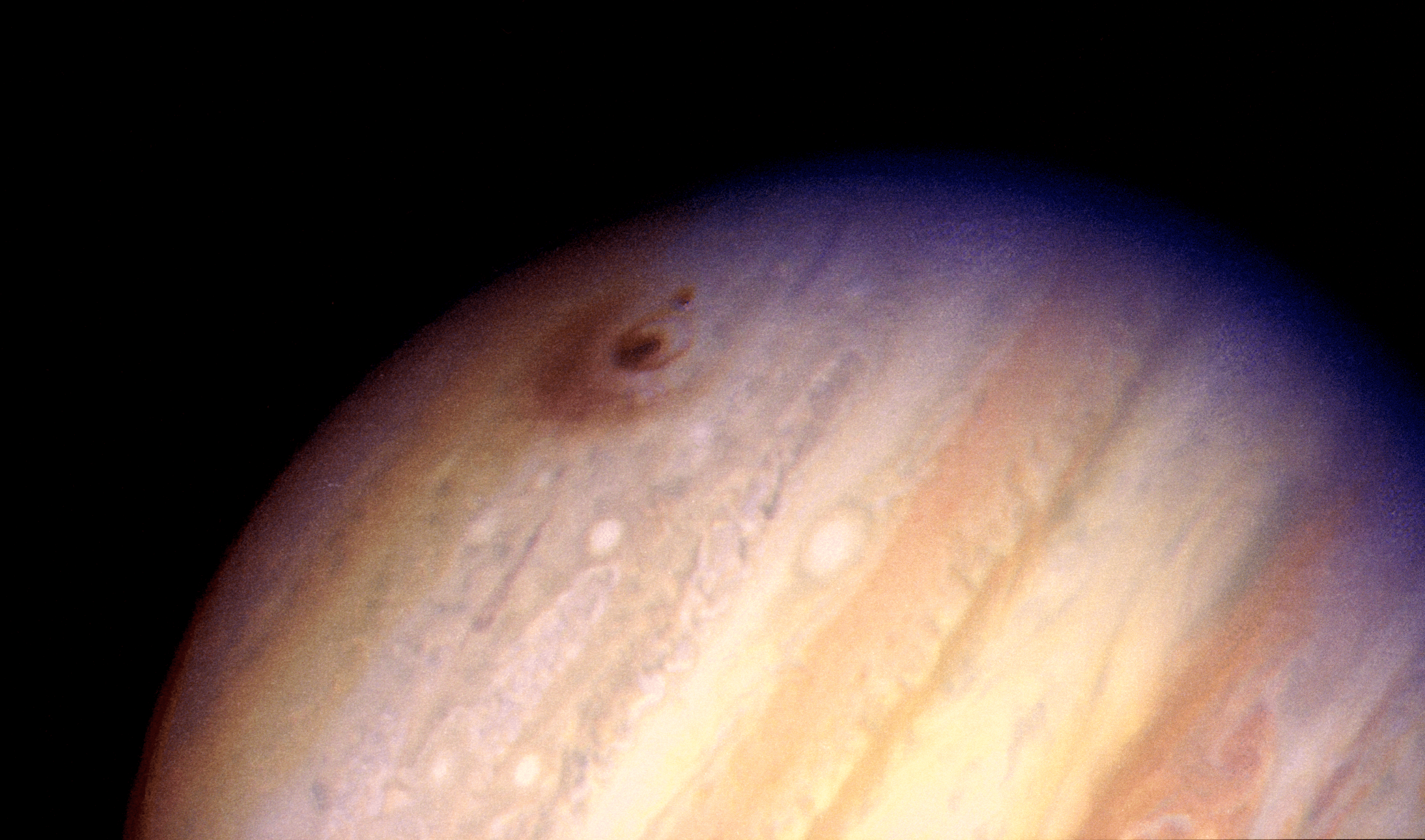
Comet Shoemaker-Levy 9's scar on Jupiter (dark area near Jupiter's limb)

Jupiter is the most massive planet in the Solar System, and because of its large mass it has a vast sphere of gravitational influence, the region of space where an asteroid capture can take place under favorable conditions.

Jupiter is able to capture comets in orbit around the Sun with a certain frequency. In general, these comets travel some revolutions around the planet following unstable orbits as highly elliptical and perturbable by solar gravity. While some of them eventually recover a heliocentric orbit, others crash on the planet or, more rarely, on its satellites.

In addition to the mass factor, its relative proximity to the inner solar system allows Jupiter to influence the distribution of minor bodies there. For a long time it was believed that these characteristics led the gas giant to expel from the system or to attract most of the wandering objects in its vicinity and, consequently, to determine a reduction in the number of potentially dangerous objects for the Earth. Subsequent dynamic studies have shown that in reality the situation is more complex: the presence of Jupiter, in fact, tends to reduce the frequency of impact on the Earth of objects coming from the Oort cloud, while it increases it in the case of asteroids and short period comets.

For this reason Jupiter is the planet of the Solar System characterized by the highest frequency of impacts, which justifies its reputation as the "sweeper" or "cosmic vacuum cleaner" of the Solar System. 2009 studies suggest an impact frequency of one every 50–350 years, for an object of 0.5–1 km in diameter; impacts with smaller objects would occur more frequently. Another study estimated that comets 0.3 km (0.19 mi) in diameter impact the planet once in approximately 500 years and those 1.6 km (0.99 mi) in diameter do so just once in every 6,000 years.

In July 1994, Comet Shoemaker–Levy 9 was a comet that broke apart and collided with Jupiter, providing the first direct observation of an extraterrestrial collision of Solar System objects. The event served as a "wake-up call", and astronomers responded by starting programs such as Lincoln Near-Earth Asteroid Research (LINEAR), Near-Earth Asteroid Tracking (NEAT), Lowell Observatory Near-Earth Object Search (LONEOS) and several others which have drastically increased the rate of asteroid discovery.

The 2009 impact event happened on July 19 when a new black spot about the size of Earth was discovered in Jupiter's southern hemisphere by amateur astronomer Anthony Wesley. Thermal infrared analysis showed it was warm and spectroscopic methods detected ammonia. JPL scientists confirmed that there was another impact event on Jupiter, probably involving a small undiscovered comet or other icy body. The impactor is estimated to have been about 200–500 meters in diameter.

Later minor impacts were observed by amateur astronomers in 2010, 2012, 2016, and 2017; one impact was observed by Juno in 2020.

==== Other impacts ====
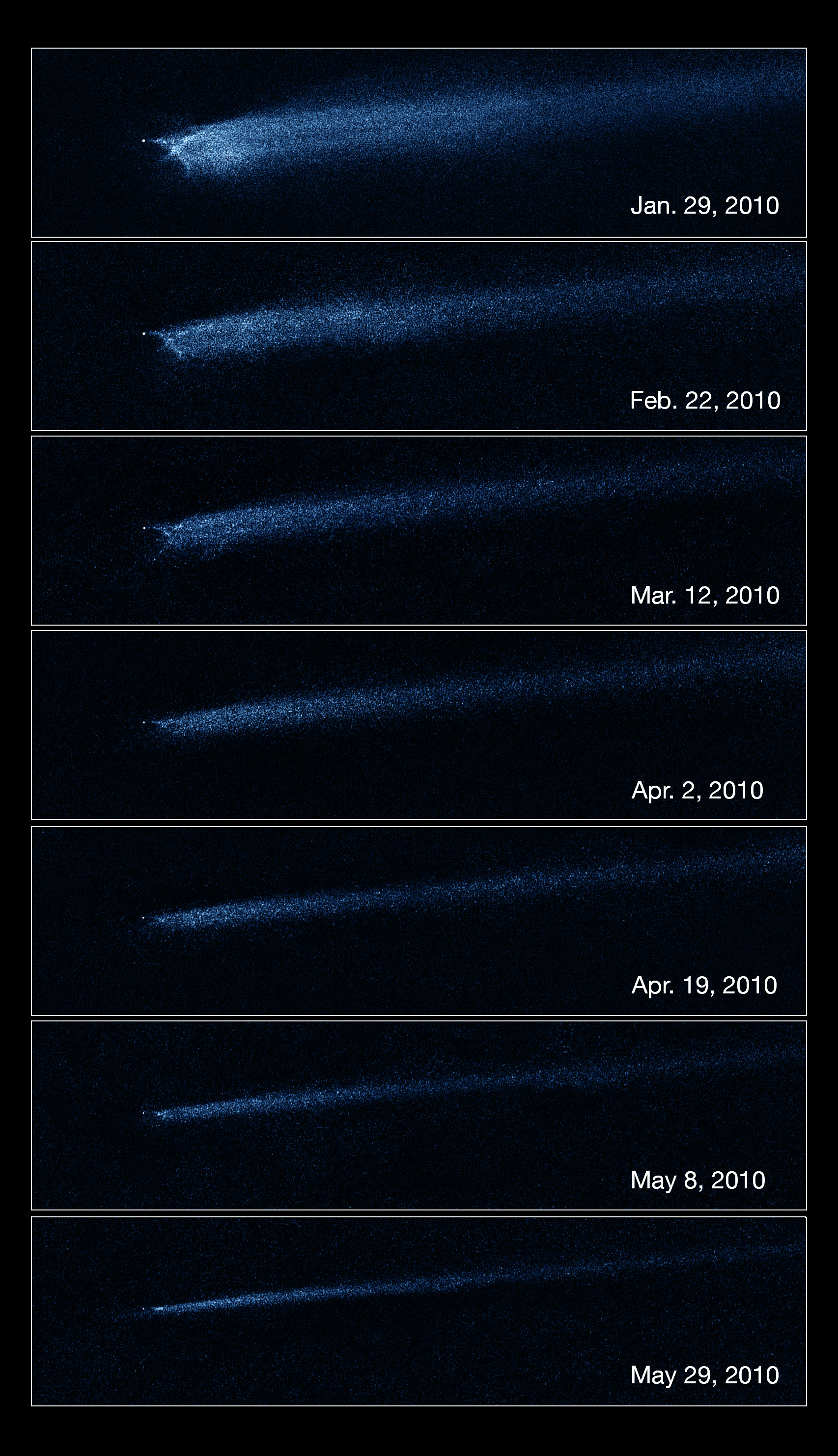
Hubble's Wide Field Camera 3 clearly shows the slow evolution of the debris coming from asteroid P/2010 A2, assumed to be due to a collision with a smaller asteroid.

In 1998, two comets were observed plunging toward the Sun in close succession. The first of these was on June 1 and the second the next day. A video of this, followed by a dramatic ejection of solar gas (unrelated to the impacts), can be found at the NASA website. Both of these comets evaporated before coming into contact with the surface of the Sun. According to a theory by NASA Jet Propulsion Laboratory scientist Zdeněk Sekanina, the latest impactor to actually make contact with the Sun was the "supercomet" Howard-Koomen-Michels, also known as Solwind 1, on August 30, 1979. (See also sungrazer.)

In 2010, between January and May, Hubble's Wide Field Camera 3 took images of an unusual X shape originated in the aftermath of the collision between asteroid P/2010 A2 with a smaller asteroid.

Around March 27, 2012, based on evidence, there were signs of an impact on Mars. Images from the Mars Reconnaissance Orbiter provide compelling evidence of the largest impact observed to date on Mars in the form of fresh craters, the largest measuring 48.5 by 43.5 meters. It is estimated to be caused by an impactor 3 to 5 meters long.

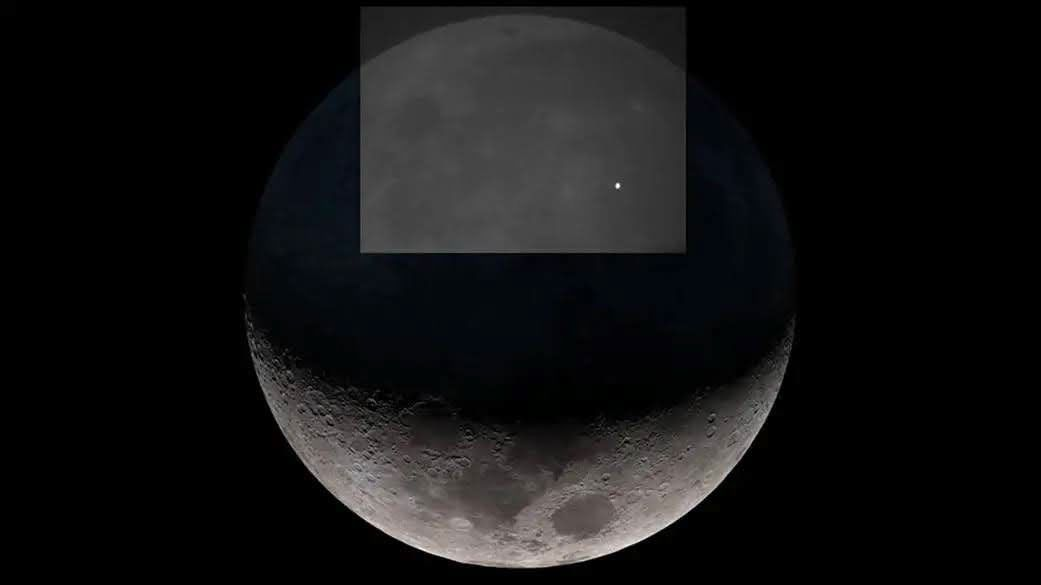
Lunar impact flash image shown superimposed on the Moon

NASA has actively monitored lunar impacts since 2005, tracking hundreds of candidate events. On March 19, 2013, an impact occurred on the Moon that was visible from Earth, when a boulder-sized 30 cm meteoroid slammed into the lunar surface at 90,000 km/h (25 km/s; 56,000 mph) creating a 20-meter crater.

On 18 September 2021 an impact event on Mars formed a cluster of craters, the largest being 130m in diameter. On 24 December 2021 an impact created a 150m-wide crater. Debris was ejected up to 35 km (22 mi) from the impact site.

===== Human caused impacts =====
Double Asteroid Redirection Test impact and its corresponding plume as seen by using the Mookodi instrument on the SAAO's 1-m Lesedi telescope

In recent decades, human made probes have impacted either intentionally or unintentionally on several objects. Most of these probes were destroyed with little observable damage to their target. Some such probes on the Moon and Mars have left observable craters and debris. This includes landings such as the 1969 Apollo 11 Moon Landing Site. High velocity crashes such as the 1972 Apollo 16 S-IVB rocket, 2019 Schiaparelli EDM and 2023 Luna 25 have also made physical changes to the landscape in the form of impact craters.

Specific missions designed to study effects including ejecta on target objects included 2005 Deep Impact mission on Tempel 1 which caused an 100+ meter diameter crater, 2019 Hayabusa2 mission on 162173 Ryugu, 2020 OSIRIS-REx mission on 101955 Bennu and 2022 Double Asteroid Redirection Test on Dimorphos. Observations show that Dimorphos lost approximately 1 million kilograms of mass and had its orbit changed as a result of the deliberate impact with the human made probe.

== Extrasolar impacts ==
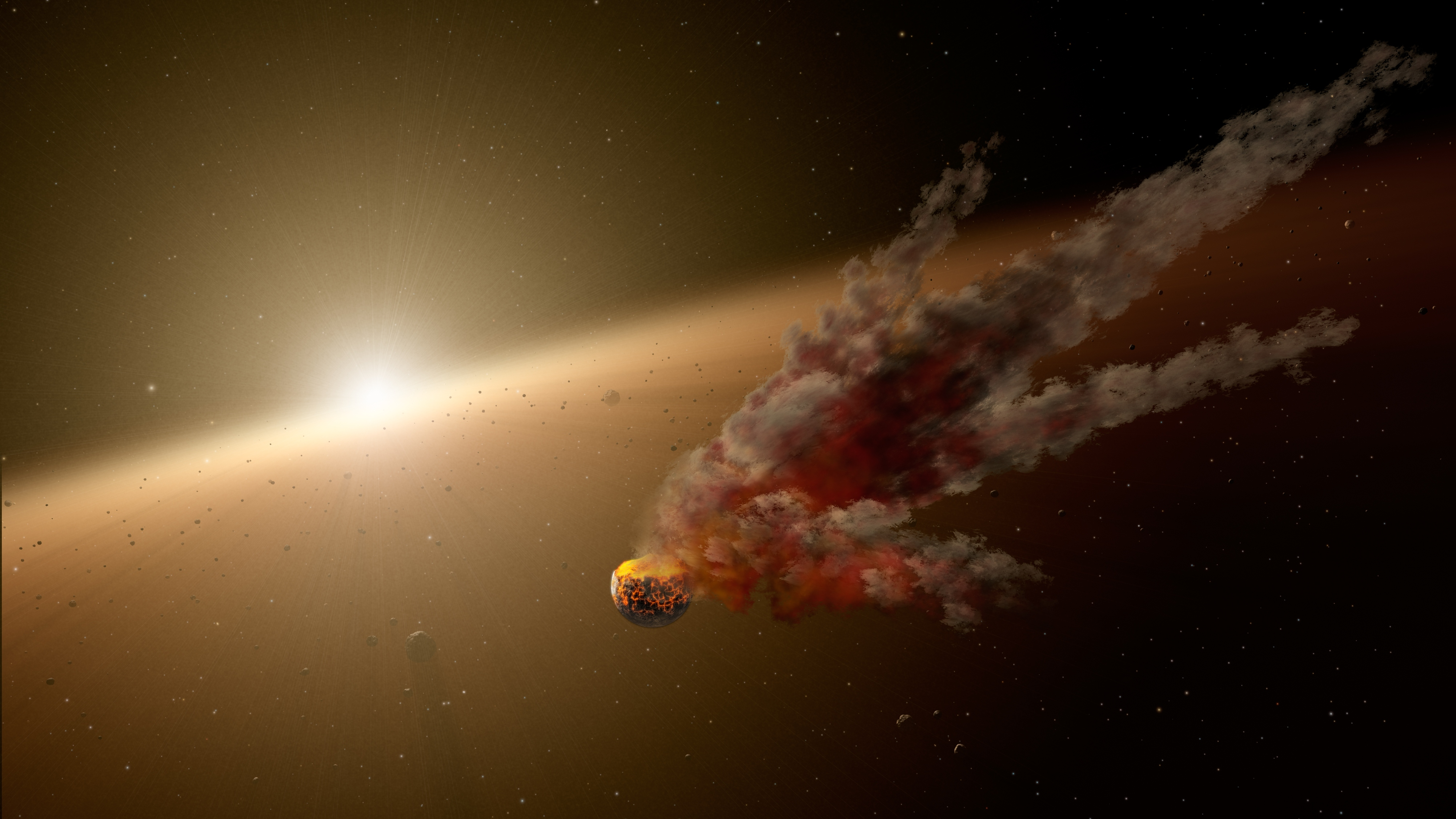
Asteroid collision led to the building of planets near star NGC 2547-ID8 (artist concept).

Collisions between galaxies, or galaxy mergers, have been observed directly by space telescopes such as Hubble and Spitzer. However, collisions in planetary systems including stellar collisions, while long speculated, have only recently begun to be observed directly.

In 2013, an impact between minor planets was detected around the star NGC 2547 ID 8 by Spitzer and confirmed by ground observations. Computer modelling suggests that the impact involved large asteroids or protoplanets similar to the events believed to have led to the formation of terrestrial planets like the Earth.

== See also ==
- Asteroid capture – Orbital insertion of an asteroid around a larger planetary body
- Asteroid impact avoidance – Methods to prevent destructive asteroid hits
- Asteroids in fiction
- B612 Foundation – Planetary defense nonprofit organization
- Central-peak crater – Large impact craters with uplifted centres
- Earth Impact Database – Database of impact structures on Earth
- Global catastrophic risk – Hypothetical global-scale disaster risk
- Impact events in fiction
- Impact gardening – Effects of astronomic impacts on crusts of moons and planets
- Late Heavy Bombardment – Hypothesized astronomical event
- List of bolides
- List of impact craters on Earth
- List of possible impact structures on Earth
- Meteor air burst – Atmospheric explosion of a meteor
- Near-Earth asteroids – Small Solar System body with an orbit that can bring it close to Earth
- Near-Earth object – Small Solar System body with an orbit that can bring it close to Earth
- Near-Earth Object Camera – Space-based infrared telescope
- Palermo Technical Impact Hazard Scale – Logarithmic scale in astronomy
- Pan-STARRS – Multi-telescope astronomical survey
- Peak ring (crater) – Roughly circular ring within an impact crater
- Potentially hazardous object – Hazardous near-Earth asteroid or comet
- Spaceguard – Efforts to study asteroids that might impact Earth
- Torino scale – Measure for hazard from asteroid or comet impacts on Earth, 0 to 10
