= Maniitsoq Norite Belt =

Geological map of the Maniitsoq Norite Belt showing location of all samples from Waterton et al. (2020). Norite belt U-Pb zircon ages are shown adjacent to their sample locations. Ages are colour coded by whether the sample was classed as plagioclase-rich norite (red), pyroxene-rich melanorite (blue), or unclassified (grey). Approximate extent of the Maniitsoq Norite Belt is delineated by purple curves. S. B. = Supracrustal Belt. Location of map within Greenland shown in inset.

The Maniitsoq Norite Belt is a ~75 km x 15 km J-shaped belt of igneous norite intrusions, located in the Akia Terrane of the North Atlantic Craton, Greenland, near the town of Maniitsoq. The belt is found as enclaves ranging from meter-scale pods to 8 km^{2} large intrusive bodies within the ~3050 to 2990 Ma TTG and dioritic gneisses of the Akia terrane. and formed contemporaneously with the host gneisses between ~3013 and 3001 Ma The norites underwent high grade granulite facies metamorphism at temperatures of ~800 °C and pressures of ~9 kbar (approximately 30 km depth) from ~3010 to 2980 Ma, soon after they were intruded. The norites were metamorphosed twice more at ~2.7 Ga and ~2.5 Ga.

A wide variety of norite types are found within the belt, which can be broadly divided into two main groups with different mineral proportions and chemical compositions; plagioclase-rich 'norites' and pyroxene-rich 'melanorites'. These are believed to have formed from fractional crystallisation of a single type of magma, with accumulation of dense minerals such as pyroxene in the melanorites, and accumulation of less-dense minerals such plagioclase in the norites. Their geochemical compositions indicate that they crystallised from a mafic magma, derived from partial melting of a depleted mantle source, which subsequently assimilated large amounts of continental crust. The Maniitsoq Norite Belt was interpreted to have formed in an ultra-hot orogeny due to the combination of norite formation from depleted mantle melting and crustal assimilation, TTG formation due to melting in the crust, and high temperature metamorphism that immediately followed magmatism.

The Maniitsoq Norite Belt has long been investigated for its nickel-copper-cobalt-platinum group element mineral potential. The belt was first explored by Kryolitselskabet Øresund A/S from 1959 to 1973, and subsequently investigated by Falconbridge Ltd., Nunaoil A/S, Cominco Ltd., NunaMinerals A/S, and most recently by North American Nickel Inc. Exploration was ongoing as of 2019 and planned until 2021.
