= Maniitsoq Airport =

Airport in Greenland

Maniitsoq Airport Mittarfik Maniitsoq
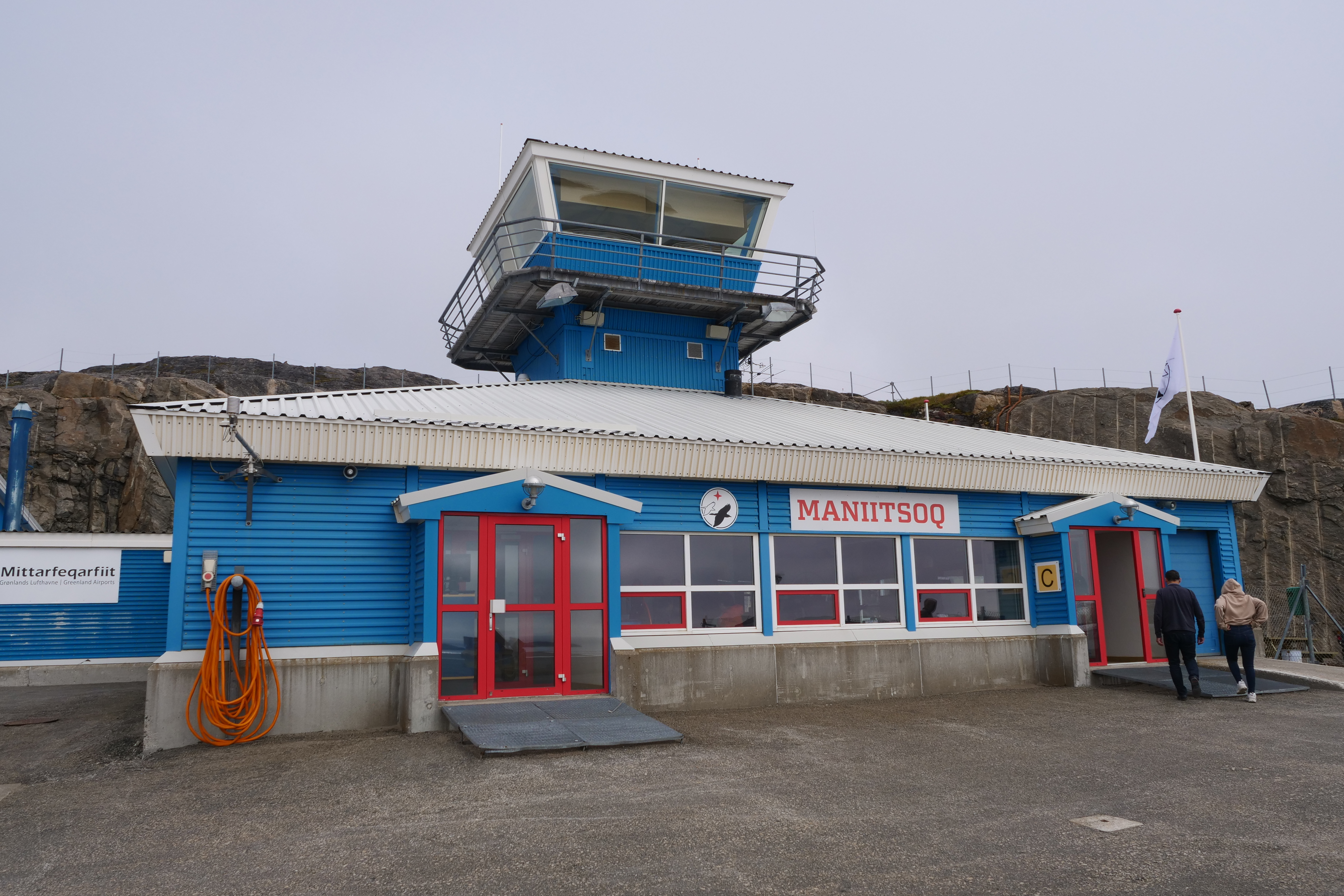
- IATA: JSU; ICAO: BGMQ

Summary
- Airport type: Public
- Operator: Greenland Airport Authority (Mittarfeqarfiit)
- Serves: Maniitsoq, Greenland
- Opened: 2 October 1999
- Elevation AMSL: 91 ft / 28 m
- Coordinates: 65°24′45″N 052°56′22″W
- Website: Maniitsoq Lufthavn

Map
- Location in Greenland

Runways
Direction	Length		Surface
Direction	m	ft	Surface
16/34	799	2,621	Asphalt

Statistics (2012)
- Passengers: 8,829
- Source: Danish AIS

Maniitsoq Airport (Greenlandic: Mittarfik Maniitsoq) (IATA: JSU, ICAO: BGMQ) is an airport located on Maniitsoq Island, 0.5 NM (0.93 km; 0.58 mi) northwest of Maniitsoq, a town in the Qeqqata municipality in central-western Greenland. It can serve STOL aircraft, although there is no deicing equipment at the airport, which is costly and problematic in Greenlandic winter.

== History ==
Maniitsoq Airport was one of the airports built in several Greenlandic towns in the late 1990s. Construction work began in 1996 and due to the extremely mountainous terrain in and around Maniitsoq was complex project. The airport opened on 2 October 1999. The airport replaced a heliport located in the town at 65.417127°N 52.891001°W.

== Airlines and destinations ==
Airlines	Destinations
Air Greenland	Nuuk , Ilulissat
