= Maniitsoq Island =

Island in Greenland

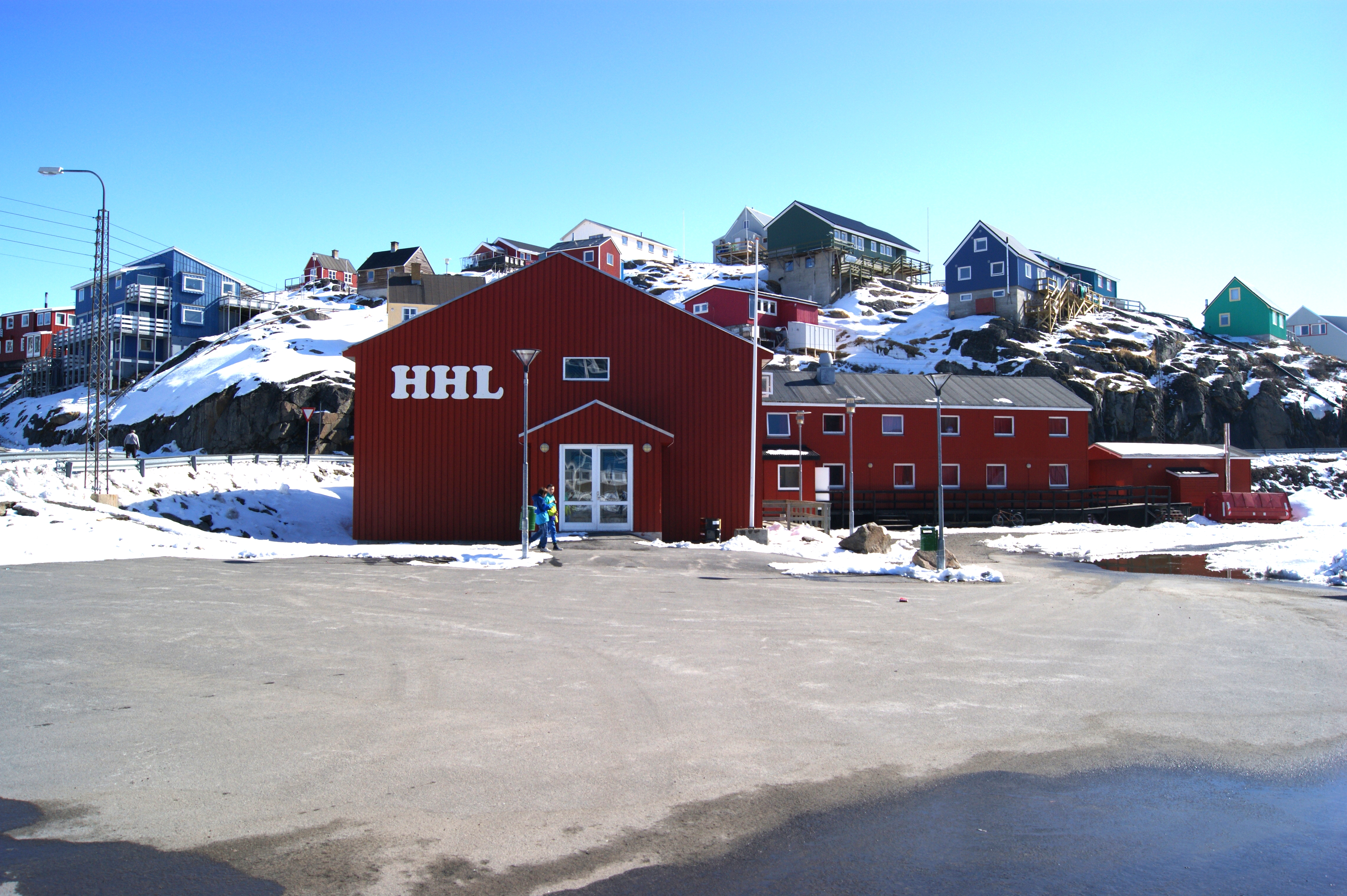
- View of Maniitsoq town

- Location within Greenland

Geography
- Location: Davis Strait
- Coordinates: 65°28′00″N 52°59′00″W
- Highest elevation: 216 m (709 ft)

Administration
- Greenland
- Municipality: Qeqqata

Demographics
- Population: 2670 (2013)

Maniitsoq Island is an island in the Qeqqata municipality in western Greenland.

== Geography ==
The island is located on the shores of Davis Strait, separated from Sermersuut Island in the north by the Ammarqoq Sound. The island is roughly triangular in shape and many little islets and rocks dot its eastern and southwestern coastline.

Located at the southern end of the island, Maniitsoq was formerly known as Sukkertoppen. It is the only settlement in the area and is served by the Maniitsoq Airport.

== See also ==
- List of islands of Greenland
