= Sermersuut Island =

Island in Greenland

Sermersuut
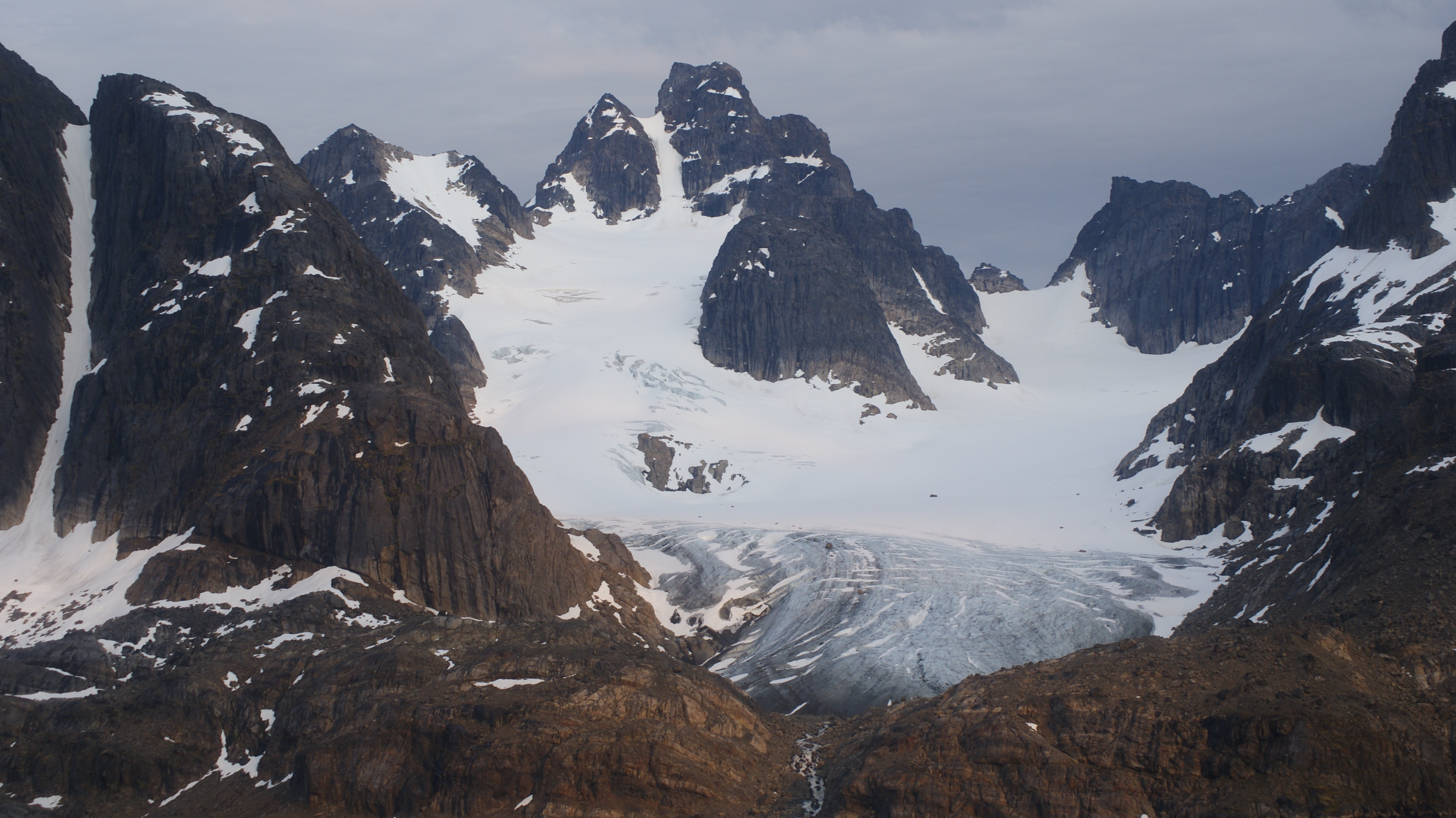
- Glaciers on Sermersuut island

- Location within Greenland

Geography
- Location: Davis Strait
- Coordinates: 65°35′00″N 53°05′00″W

Administration
- Greenland
- Municipality: Qeqqata

Sermersuut Island (old spelling: Sermersût, Danish: Hamborgerland) is an uninhabited island in the Qeqqata municipality in western Greenland.

== Geography ==
Map of Sermersuut Island

The island is located on the shores of Davis Strait, separated from Maniitsoq Island in the south by the Ammarqoq Sound, and from the mainland in the east by the Ikamiut Kangerluarsuat fjord. The island is very mountainous and glaciated in the north, with several distinct mountain peaks. The highest point on the island is 1,031 metres (3,383 ft).
