= Maniitsoq =

Town in Greenland

Maniitsoq Sukkertoppen
- Town
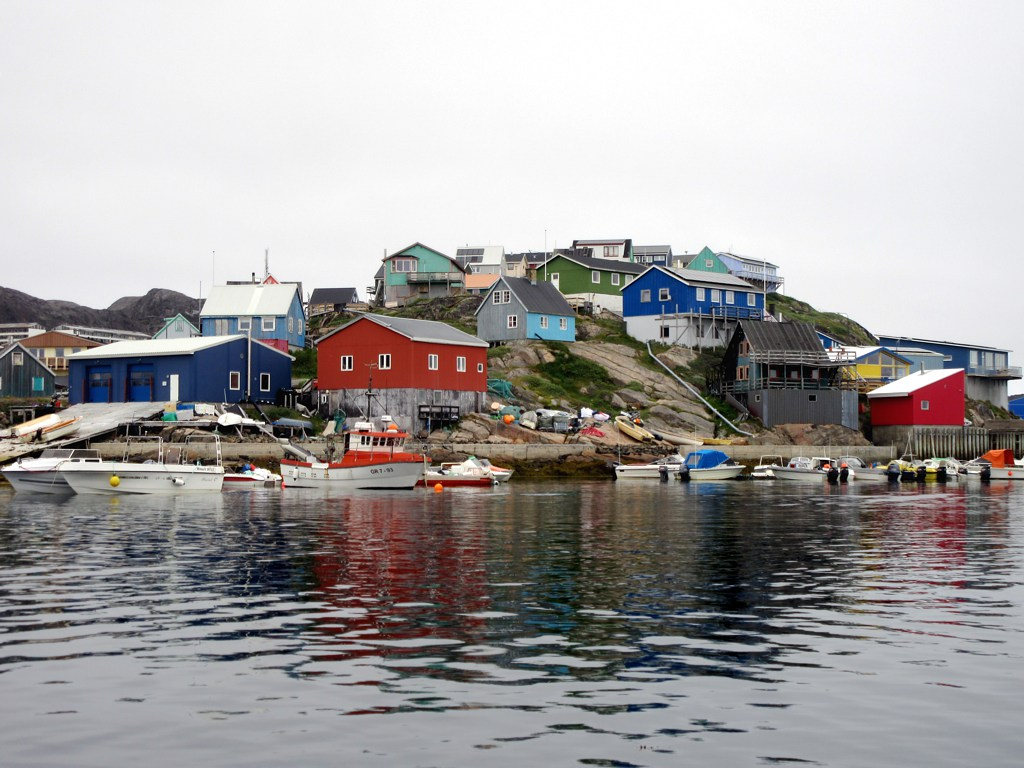
- Maniitsoq

- Location within Greenland
- Coordinates: 65°25′00″N 52°54′00″W
- State: Kingdom of Denmark
- Constituent country: Greenland
- Municipality: Qeqqata
- Founded: 1782

Population (2025)
  - Total: 2,482
- Time zone: UTC−02:00 (Western Greenland Time)
  - Summer (DST): UTC−01:00 (Western Greenland Summer Time)
- Postal code: 3912
- Website: maniitsoq.gl

Maniitsoq (Greenlandic pronunciation: [maniːtsːɔq]) or Sukkertoppen is a town on Maniitsoq Island, western Greenland located in the Qeqqata municipality. With 2,534 inhabitants as of 2020, it is the sixth-largest town in Greenland.

== History ==
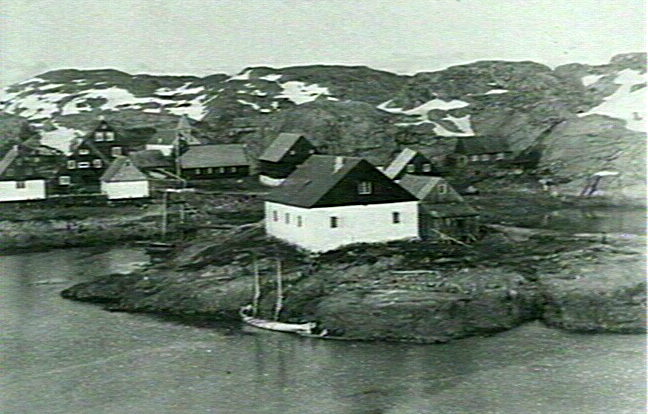

Archaeological finds indicate that the area has been settled for more than 4,000 years.

The modern town was founded as New or Nye-Maniitsoq in 1782 by Danish colonists relocating from the original Sukkertoppen, a trading post founded in 1755 at the site of present-day Kangaamiut. In time, the original name was taken up again.

In the 19th century, the town served as a major trading post for the Royal Greenland Trading Department's trade in reindeer hides.

Maniitsoq Municipality was a former municipality of Greenland. It is now part of Qeqqata Municipality.

=== Climate ===
Maniitsoq experiences a tundra climate (Köppen: ET); with short, quite cool summers and long, freezing winters. In the climate box below, the temperature extremes were combined from both the 1961-1979 and 1991-2020 observational periods.

Climate data for Maniitsoq Airport (65.40°N 52.93°W) (28 m (92 ft) AMSL) (1961-2020 data)
| Month | Jan | Feb | Mar | Apr | May | Jun | Jul | Aug | Sep | Oct | Nov | Dec | Year |
|---|---|---|---|---|---|---|---|---|---|---|---|---|---|
| Record high °C (°F) | 9.6 (49.3) | 9.7 (49.5) | 12.3 (54.1) | 13.4 (56.1) | 18.4 (65.1) | 21.0 (69.8) | 25.9 (78.6) | 23.3 (73.9) | 22.0 (71.6) | 17.8 (64.0) | 11.6 (52.9) | 9.9 (49.8) | 25.9 (78.6) |
| Mean daily maximum °C (°F) | −5.1 (22.8) | −5.6 (21.9) | −4.4 (24.1) | −0.2 (31.6) | 4.5 (40.1) | 8.6 (47.5) | 11.5 (52.7) | 10.8 (51.4) | 7.1 (44.8) | 3.1 (37.6) | −1.0 (30.2) | −3.6 (25.5) | 2.1 (35.8) |
| Daily mean °C (°F) | −7.3 (18.9) | −8.4 (16.9) | −7.4 (18.7) | −3.0 (26.6) | 1.8 (35.2) | 5.5 (41.9) | 8.2 (46.8) | 8.0 (46.4) | 4.9 (40.8) | 0.9 (33.6) | −3.1 (26.4) | −5.6 (21.9) | −0.5 (31.1) |
| Mean daily minimum °C (°F) | −9.3 (15.3) | −10.7 (12.7) | −10.0 (14.0) | −5.5 (22.1) | −0.6 (30.9) | 3.0 (37.4) | 5.6 (42.1) | 5.7 (42.3) | 3.1 (37.6) | −1.0 (30.2) | −5.0 (23.0) | −7.5 (18.5) | −2.7 (27.1) |
| Record low °C (°F) | −23.5 (−10.3) | −29.1 (−20.4) | −25.4 (−13.7) | −19.8 (−3.6) | −11.9 (10.6) | −3.4 (25.9) | −0.7 (30.7) | −2.2 (28.0) | −4.3 (24.3) | −11.8 (10.8) | −18.4 (−1.1) | −25.0 (−13.0) | −29.1 (−20.4) |
| Average precipitation mm (inches) | 25 (1.0) | 32 (1.3) | 36 (1.4) | 33 (1.3) | 38 (1.5) | 54 (2.1) | 91 (3.6) | 97 (3.8) | 102 (4.0) | 65 (2.6) | 58 (2.3) | 36 (1.4) | 667 (26.3) |
| Average extreme snow depth cm (inches) | 53 (21) | 68 (27) | 77 (30) | 69 (27) | 30 (12) | 3 (1.2) | 0 (0) | 0 (0) | 0 (0) | 5 (2.0) | 20 (7.9) | 37 (15) | 77 (30) |
| Average precipitation days (≥ 1.0 mm) | 7.1 | 7.8 | 8.1 | 6.8 | 7.5 | 7.8 | 9.3 | 9.2 | 11.7 | 10.1 | 9.3 | 8.3 | 102.9 |
| Average snowy days (≥ 0.1 cm) | 11.3 | 12.0 | 13.2 | 10.1 | 7.4 | 3.1 | 0.1 | 0.2 | 3.6 | 8.6 | 11.9 | 11.6 | 93.1 |
| Average relative humidity (%) | 66.9 | 67.2 | 68.1 | 70.9 | 76.9 | 82.4 | 80.8 | 82.7 | 74.8 | 69.3 | 69.4 | 69.4 | 73.2 |
Source: Danish Meteorological Institute (2001-2020 temperature & humidity) (1961-1979 extremes, precipitation & snow)

== Industry ==
There have been plans for an Alcoa aluminium smelting plant either at Maniitsoq or Sisimiut for an extended period, at least since 2008, without progressing to construction. The plant would provide employment for 600–700 people, or more than one percent of the population of Greenland. As it is a vital decision for the town, wide public consultations were carried out in 2008–2010 by both the town authorities and the Greenland Home Rule Government in order to address potential environmental and social concerns.

== Transport ==
=== Air ===
Maniitsoq is served by Air Greenland with flights to Nuuk and Sisimiut.

=== Sea ===
Maniitsoq is a port of call for the Arctic Umiaq ferry.

== Population ==
With 2,534 inhabitants as of 2020, Maniitsoq has experienced a decline in population over a long period of time. The town has lost almost 15% of its population relative to 1990 levels, and nearly 9% relative to 2000 levels.

Migrants from the smaller settlements such as rapidly depopulating Kangaamiut choose to migrate to Sisimiut, the capital in Nuuk, and sometimes to Denmark, rather than Maniitsoq. Kangerlussuaq and Sisimiut are the only settlement in the Qeqqata municipality exhibiting stable growth patterns over the last two decades.

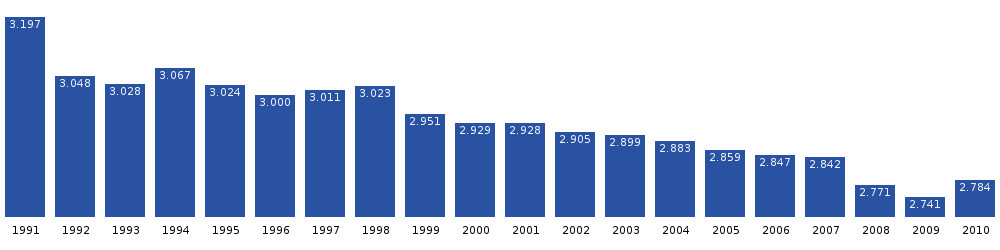
Maniitsoq population dynamics, 1991-2010. Source: Statistics Greenland

== Notable people ==
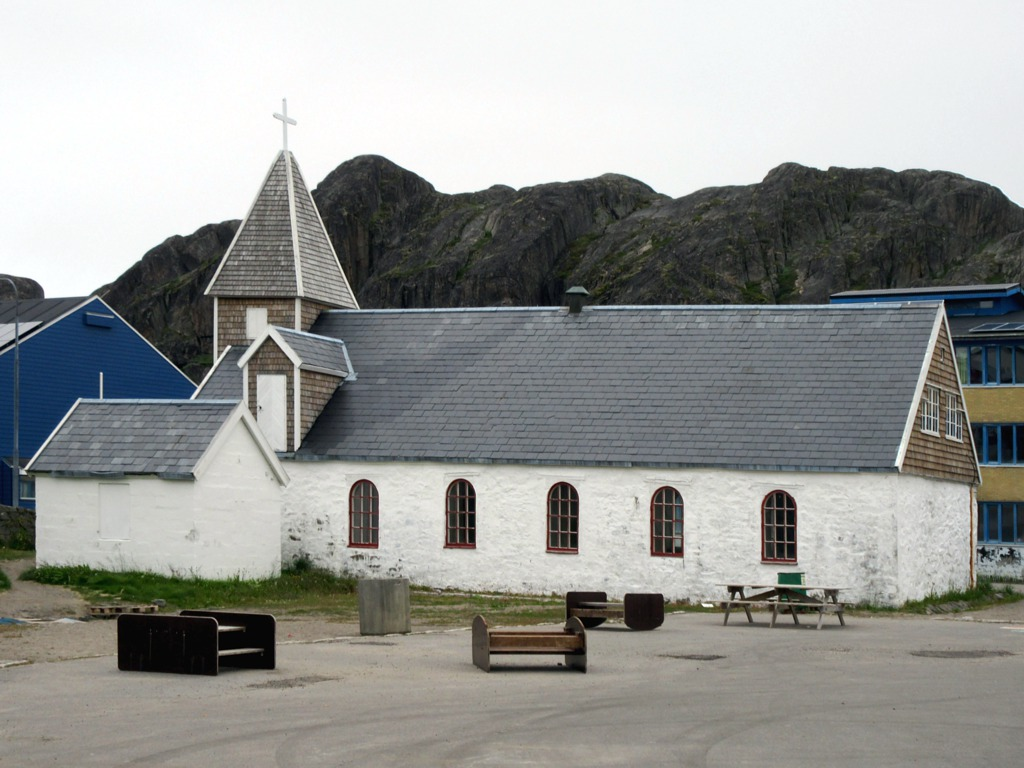
Sukkertoppen Church, Maniitsoq

- Germaine Arnaktauyok (b. 1946), Inuk printmaker, painter, and drawer
- Mimi Karlsen (b. 1957), politician
- Sofie Petersen (b. 1955), Lutheran Bishop of Greenland
- Rasmus Lyberth (b. 1951), singer, actor
- Thue Christiansen (1940–2022), designer of the Greenlandic flag, artist

== Literature ==
The novel The Prophets of Eternal Fjord by Kim Leine is set in Sukkertoppen.

== Maniitsoq structure ==
The Maniitsoq structure is a proposed 3 billion-year-old (3 Ga) impact structure located in the Akia terrane of the North Atlantic Craton, centred about 55 km (34 mi) south-east of the town of Maniitsoq, Greenland, at 65°15′N 51°50′W. Its origin has been debated since it was first proposed as an impact structure in 2012. The Maniitsoq structure is not recognised as an impact structure by the Earth Impact Database.

The proposal was criticised for not meeting established criteria for recognising impact craters. Subsequent studies in the region have demonstrated that there is no evidence for an impact structure, and a number of observations directly contradict the earlier impact structure proposals.

In support of the proposal, a study published in 2023, used electron microscopy to examine zircon grains from seven sites, including the Maniitsoq structure. The study found distinctive shock-induced planar microstructures in the zircon grains from the four recognized impact structure, as well as in the Maniitsoq structure. These microstructures were not found in grains from the two non-impact tectonic deformation structures.

== Twin towns – sister cities ==
Maniitsoq is twinned with:

- Esbjerg, Denmark
- Salzburg, Austria
