= Akia terrane =

The Akia terrane is a tectonostratigraphic terrane located in the North Atlantic Craton in southern West Greenland. The Akia terrane is bounded to the Southeast by the Eo- to Neo-archaean tectonostratigraphic terranes of the Nuuk region, and to the North by the recently recognised Alanngua Complex, which separates the Akia terrane from the Neoarchaean Tuno terrane. The crust in the Akia terrane formed in two major pulses. The first at ~3.2 Ga, predominantly comprises dioritic gneisses, whereas the second, at ~3.0 Ga comprises a more diverse mix of TTG and dioritic gneisses with enclaves of supracrustal rocks and mafic-ultramafic intrusions. Supracrustal rocks are largely tholeiitic and calc-alkaline amphibolites formed at ~3.07 Ga. The mafic-ultramafic intrusions include peridotite cumulates and a belt of noritic intrusions formed at the same time as the TTG gneisses, the Maniitsoq Norite Belt. Various tectonic settings have been proposed for the 3.0 Ga crust forming event, including subduction related magmatism, stagnant lid tectonic processes, and crust and mantle melting in an ultra-hot orogeny.

The terrane underwent high grade granulite facies metamorphism at ~3.0 Ga, immediately after or simultaneous with the second major crust forming event. Further high temperature metamorphism followed at ~2.7 Ga and ~2.5 Ga. The earlier event is marked by widespread formation of pegmatite granite dykes and may be associated with the juxtaposition of the Akia and Tuno terranes.
