= Lid tectonics =

Aspect of planetary geology

Lid tectonics, commonly thought of as stagnant lid tectonics or single lid tectonics, is the type of tectonics that is believed to exist on several silicate planets and moons in the Solar System, and possibly existed on Earth during the very early part of its history. The lid is the equivalent of the lithosphere, formed of solid silicate minerals. The relative stability and immobility of the strong cooler lids leads to stagnant lid tectonics, which has greatly reduced amounts of horizontal tectonics compared with plate tectonics (which can also be described as mobile lid tectonics).

The presence of a stagnant lid above a convecting mantle was recognised as a possible stable regime for convection on early Earth, in contrast to the well-attested mobile plate tectonics of the current eon. The transition to plate tectonics may have occurred 3.2–2.3 billion years ago during the Archean epoch.

== Formation ==
A lid tectonic regime arises when the cold upper lithosphere is too viscous to participate in the underlying flow of the mantle. The lid's yield strength is high enough where the lid cannot brittlely fail. This relationship relies heavily on the ratio of lithospheric strength to natural convective stresses. Hence, if lithospheric strength is greater than convective stresses, then there are stagnant lid tectonics.

== Factors contributing to lid tectonics ==
Many characteristics of a planetary body influence the presence and degree of lid tectonics. The temperature of a body's core–mantle boundary, and the presence of water, strongly affect the rheological, composition, and thermal diagnostics of lid tectonics.

The lid will not participate in the underlying convection of the mantle. At the base of the lithosphere, where the lid is in contact with less viscous material, melts will form at the thermal boundary layer and cause drips, believed to be of peridotite composition. This stagnant lid regime will not effectively mix a mantle.

== Other planetary bodies ==
Stagnant lid regime is the most common tectonic style that exists in the Solar System. Mercury, the Moon, Venus, and Io are all believed to have been dominated by lid tectonics for their entire history. In the mantle of both Mercury and the Moon, heat is mainly lost by conduction across the lid, leading to low heat flows. Solomatov and Moresi used the term "stagnant lid" when they characterized the tectonic style that was present on Venus in 1996. They stated that Venus had plumes similar to Earth, that would rise to the surface, and cold "drips" of lithosphere would sink back down. Mars is also believed to have stagnant lid tectonics, albeit, much slower in comparison to Venus.
