= Maniitsoq Municipality =

Municipality in Greenland

Maniitsoq Municipality was a municipality in Greenland until 31 December 2008. Its administrative center was Maniitsoq. Within its borders were also the settlements of Atammik, Napasoq and Kangaamiut. It was incorporated along with Sisimiut Municipality into the new Qeqqata municipality on 1 January 2009.
