= Palasip Qaqqaa =

Mountain in Greenland

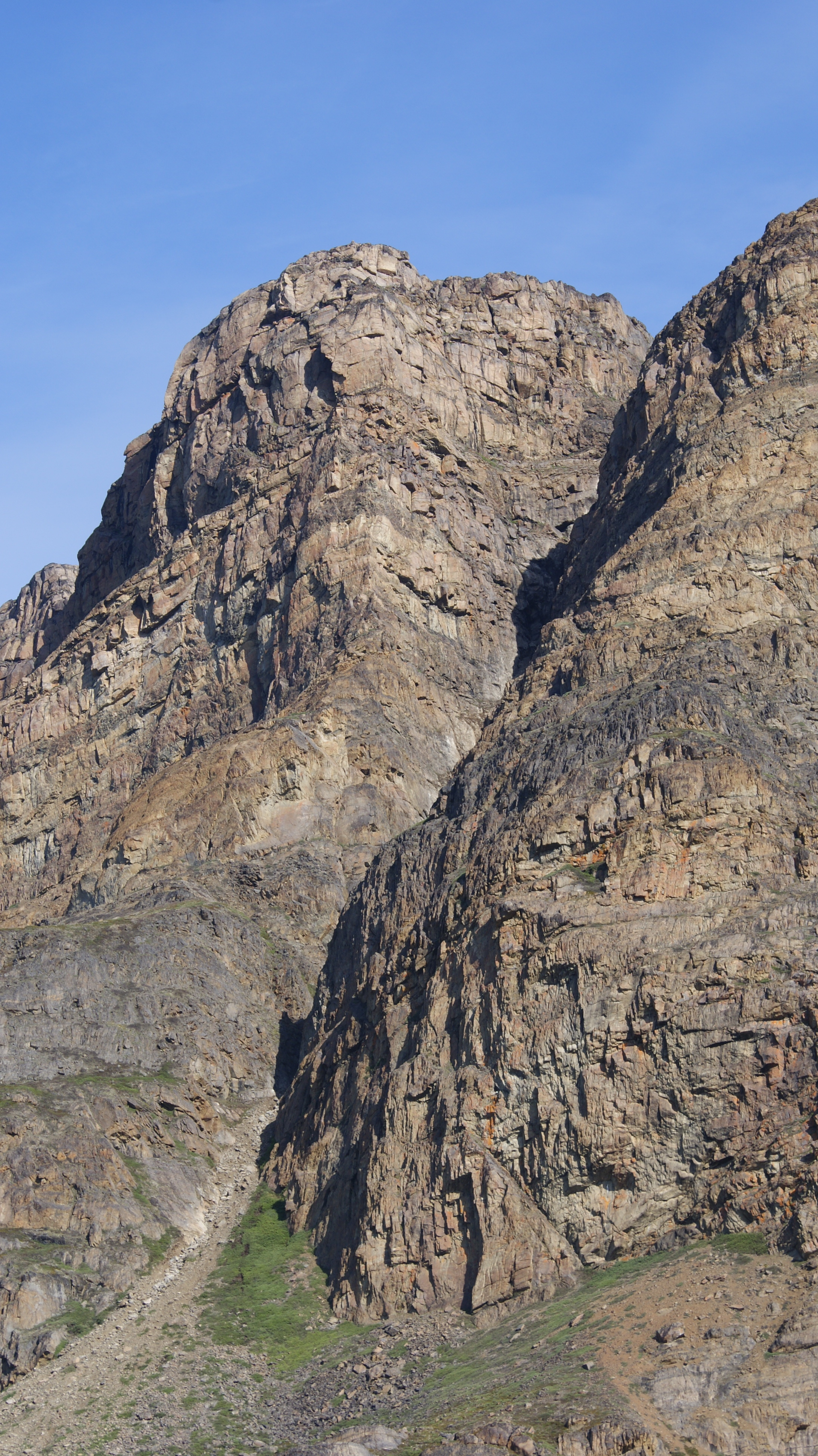
- Southern pillar in the southern wall of the main summit of Palasip Qaqqaa

Highest point
- Elevation: 544 m (1,785 ft)
- Coordinates: 66°57′55″N 53°43′20″W

Geography
- Location within Greenland
- Location: Mainland of Greenland

Palasip Qaqqaa (Danish: Præstefjeldet) is a 544-metre-high (1,785 ft) mountain in the Qeqqata municipality in western Greenland. It is located on the mainland of Greenland on the coast of Davis Strait, immediately to the north of Sisimiut Airport.

The mountain massif is spread out over 4 kilometres (2.5 mi) in the west–east direction, constituting the terminal point of a long mountain range extending from the Pingu mountain group halfway between Davis Strait and the Greenland ice sheet (Greenlandic: Sermersuaq). The range flattens considerably towards the east in the area of Kangaamiut dike swarm north of Kangerlussuaq, due to pressure exerted by the icesheet for long periods in the past.

== Topography ==
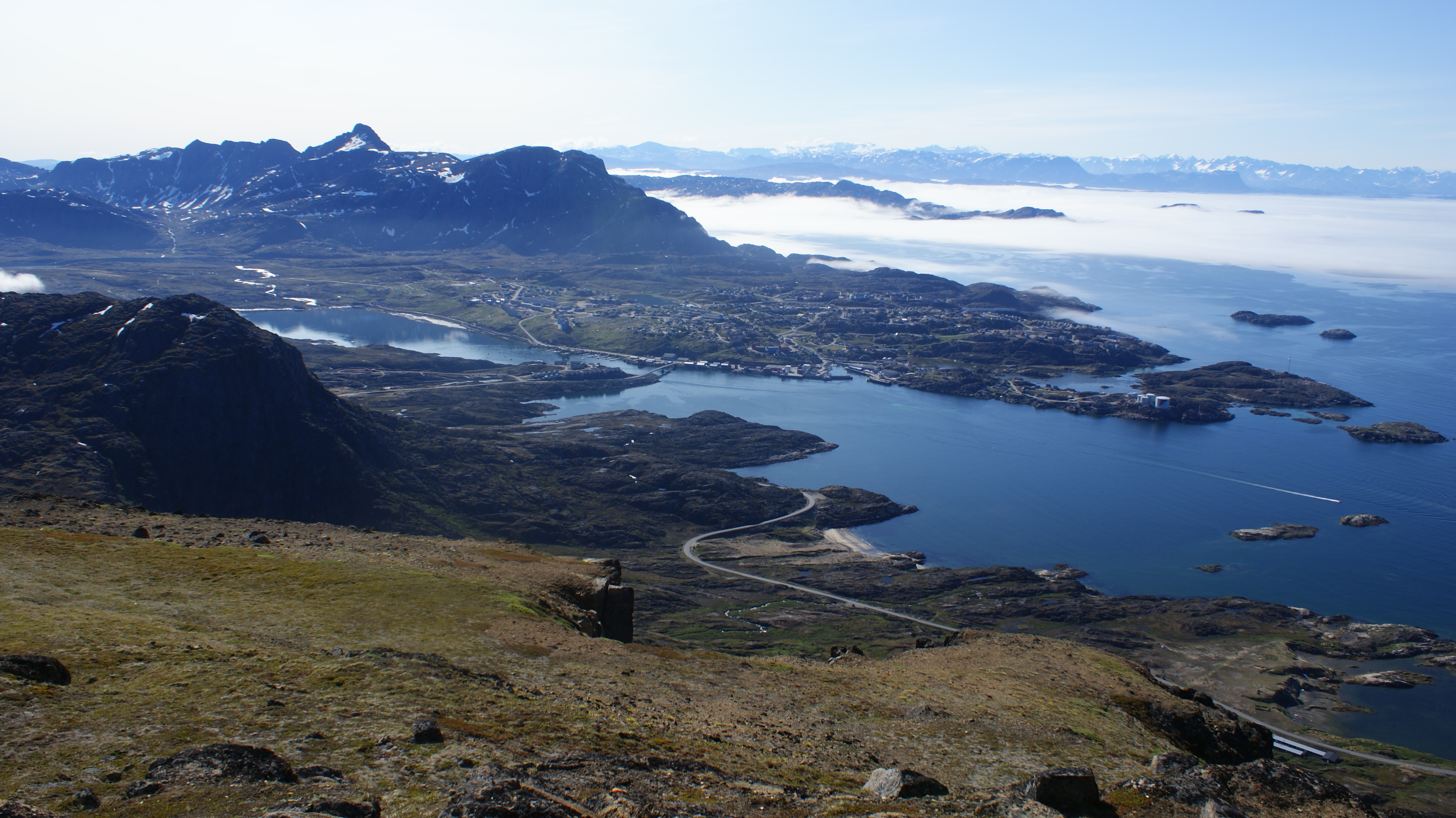
View to the south from the main summit: the road to Sisimiut Airport, Kangerluarsunnguaq Bay, Sisimiut, Nasaasaaq, Amerloq Fjord, Maniitsorsuaq Island, Uummannaarsuk, Ikertooq Fjord, Itilleq, and Paornaqussuit Qavat, the glaciated mountain range bounding Kangerlussuaq Fjord from the northwest.

Palasip Qaqqaa has two distinct summits: the western (466 m (1,529 ft)) and the main, eastern summit, culminating in two peaks at 544 m (1,785 ft). The summits are separated by a depression of a very wide saddle. The massif is separated from the remainder of the ridge via several indistinctive saddles in the east.

The southern wall of Palasip Qaqqaa − the only wall of alpine character in the massif − is bisected by a chimney between the main summit and the slightly lower trabant to the west. It is the only part of the massif of interest to mountaineers.

Past the southern pillar falling directly from the summit, the wall gradually peters out into a progressively less steep rocky and grassy slope. The northern slope is not steep and is accessible via a range of routes.

== Tourism ==
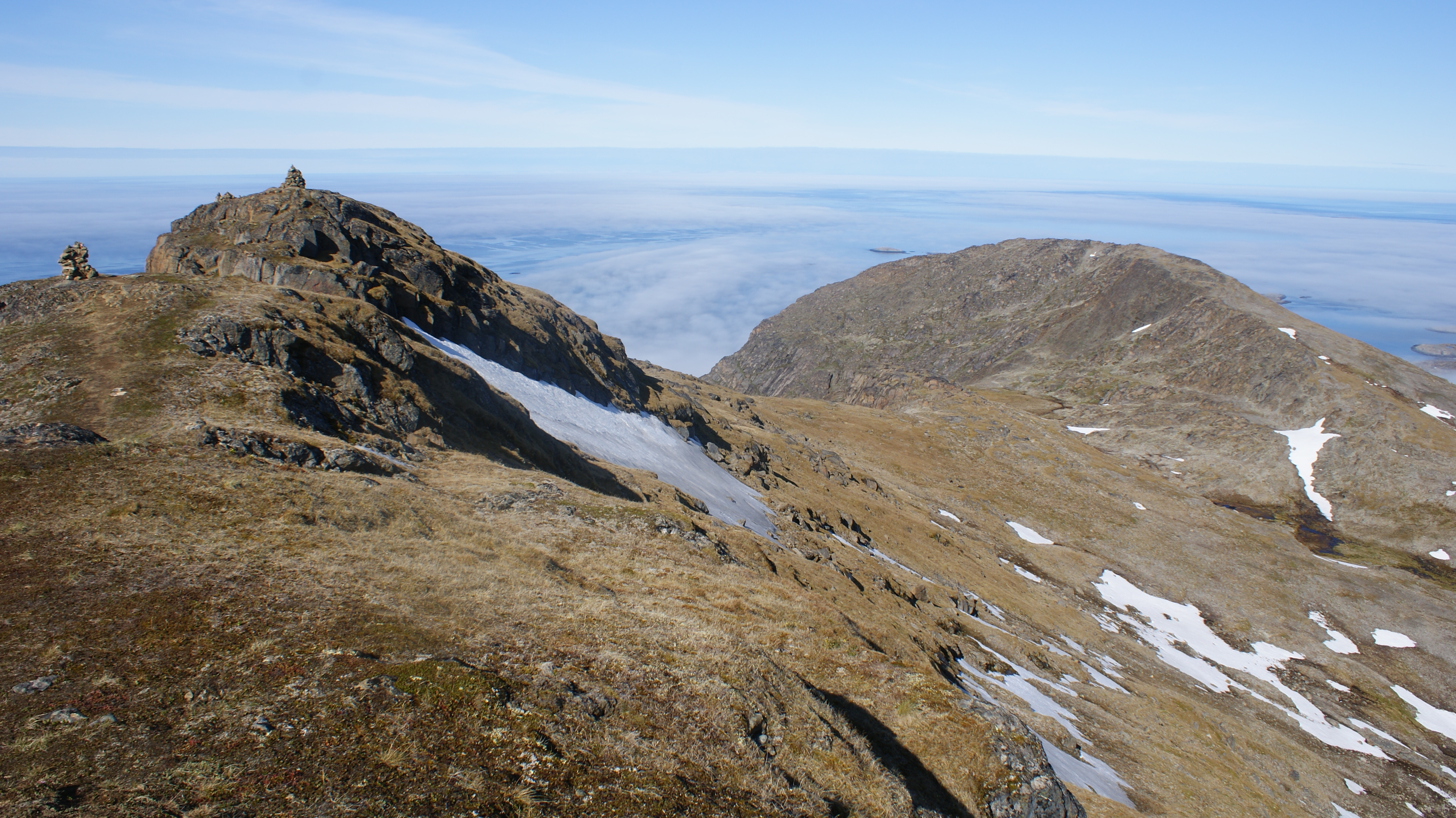
Western summit of Palasip Qaqqaa on the right

The main summit is often visited for its long-range view of the coast, through a winding path from the south. The path crosses several barriers, from grassy at the bottom, to rocky at the top. The path disappears in the depression between the last barrier and the southern slope of the main ridge to the east of the southern pillar, to reappear as a lateral ledge in the slope below the eastern ridge.

The entire massif apart from the southern wall is easily accessible, while the southern pillar of the main summit and the small northern wall of the western summit offer many short routes for climbers.
