= Amerloq Fjord =

Fjord in Greenland

- Location in Greenland
- Location: Arctic (West Greenland)
- Coordinates: 66°55′N 53°15′W
- Ocean/sea sources: Davis Strait
- Basin countries: Greenland
- Max. length: 36 km (22 mi)
- Max. width: 4.2 km (2.6 mi)

Amerloq Fjord is a 36 km (22 mi) long fjord in the Qeqqata municipality in western Greenland. The fjord empties into the Davis Strait just south of Sisimiut, whose former Inuit name was also "Amerloq".

== History ==
The Amerloq Fjord – then known as Rammel's Fjord – was the scene of the Inuit murder of the Dano-English navigator James Hall on 12 or 22 July, 1612. The Inuit were still incensed at the Danish abduction of several people during one of Christian IV's expeditions in 1605, during which Hall served as pilot for John Cunningham.

== Geography ==
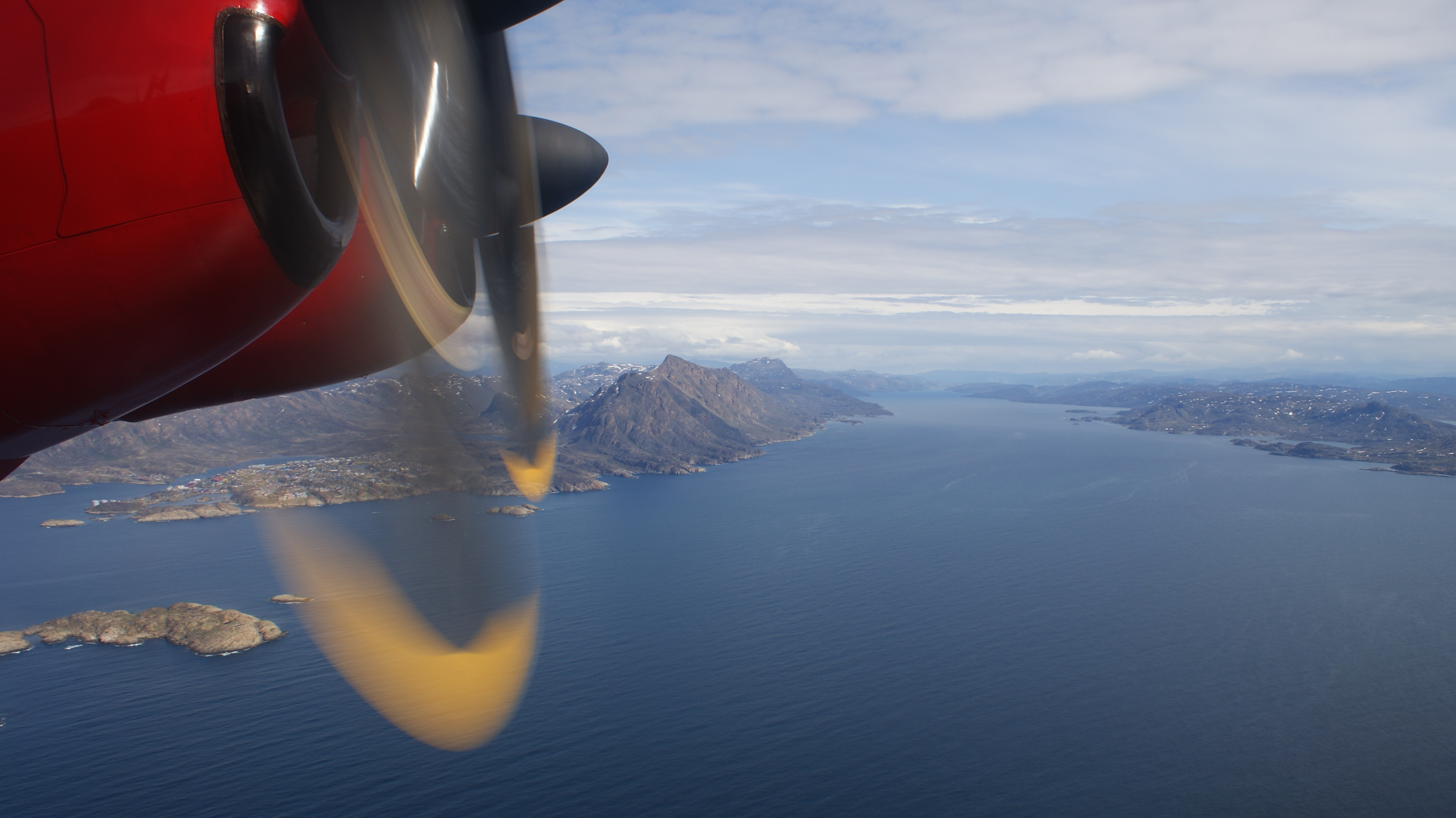
Aerial view of Amerloq Fjord, Nasaasaaq, and Sarfannguit Island

The fjord mouth is located at approximately 66°52′N 53°42′W south of the town of Sisimiut. To the north, the fjord is bounded by the Nasaasaaq ridge, whose massif is spread out over 6 kilometres (3.7 mi) in the west–east direction, constituting the terminal point of a long mountain range extending from the Pingu mountain group halfway between Davis Strait and the Greenland ice sheet (Greenlandic: Sermersuaq). The range flattens considerably towards the east in the area of Kangaamiut dike swarm north of Kangerlussuaq, due to pressure exerted by the icesheet for long periods in the past. The Nasaasaaq ridge connects to the other latitudinal ridges approximately 15 km (9.3 mi) east of Sisimiut, north of the fjord head located at approximately 66°53′30″N 52°53′30″W.

The head of the fjord is unusual in that it connects through a very narrow waterway to the wider Ikertooq Fjord. From the south, the fjord is bounded by the long Sarfannguit Island (Greenlandic: Sarfannguit Nunataat) in the center and east, and by the smaller Maniitsorsuaq Island in the west. Qeqertarmiut and Annertusoq skerries separate the fjord mouth from Kangerluarsunnguaq Bay in the north.

=== Settlements ===
There are two settlements in the vicinity of Amerloq Fjord. At the mouth of the fjord, Sisimiut town reaches to the sea in its southernmost parts. At the other end of the fjord, at the narrow waterway between the mainland and Sarfannguit Island, the small Sarfannguit settlement occupies the island promontory.

== Transport ==
Royal Arctic Line provides weekly ferry services from Sarfannguit to Sisimiut and Itilleq, a settlement further south on the coast of Davis Strait. The ships sail through the entire length of the fjord on the way.

Sisimiut is a port of call for the Arctic Umiaq Line, with connections to Ilulissat and Aasiaat in the Disko Bay region, and to coastal towns in southwestern and southern Greenland.

== See also ==
- List of fjords of Greenland
