= Nipisat Island =

Island in Greenland

Nipisat
- Location within Greenland

Geography
- Location: Davis Strait
- Coordinates: 66°48′50″N 53°30′30″W
- Area: 1.03 km^{2} (0.40 sq mi)

Administration
- Greenland
- Municipality: Qeqqata

UNESCO World Heritage Site
- Part of: Aasivissuit – Nipisat: Inuit Hunting Ground between Ice and Sea
- Criteria: Cultural: v
- Reference: 1557
- Inscription: 2018 (42nd Session)

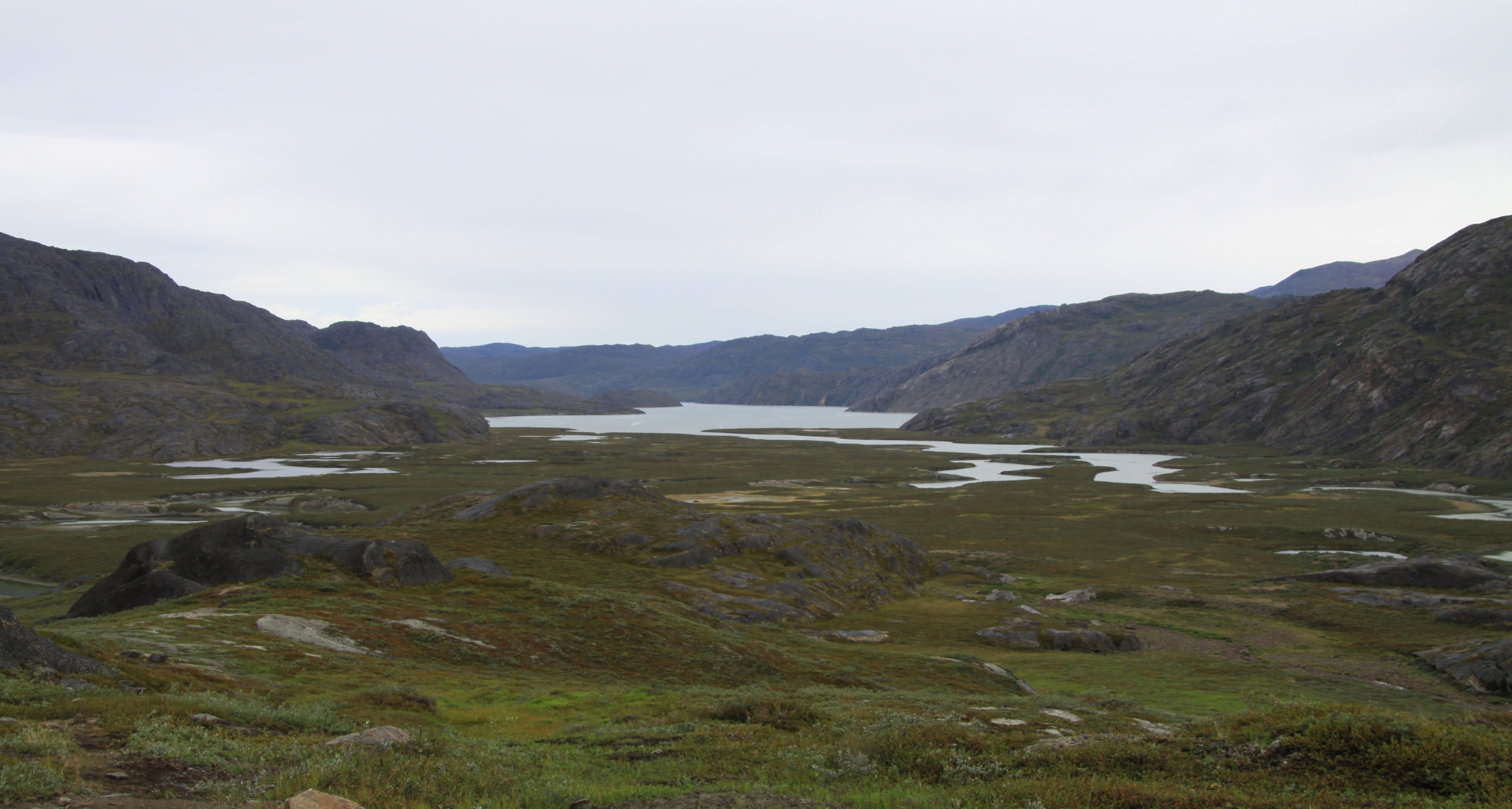
Nipisat Island in 2010

Nipisat Island (Kalaallisut: "Lumpfish", referring to the island's shape) is a small, uninhabited island in the Qeqqata municipality in central-western Greenland.

== Geography ==
Nipisat Island has situated 15 km (9.3 mi) south of Sisimiut, on the shores of Davis Strait. It belongs to the group of small islands and skerries located at the mouth of Ikertooq Fjord, immediately to the west of Sarfannguit Island. Dwarf scrub heath, dwarf birch, Arctic willow, well-drained lichens, and herb vegetation dominate the flora.

== History ==
In the 18th century, the Danes and Norwegians came to Nipisat. In 1723, Hans Egede found native people actively engaged in hunting large whalebone whales in Nipisat and the Danes established the first settlement, a trading station here. Two years later, a small mission was established on the island, but it was abandoned the following year, and then burnt down by Dutch whalers. In 1727, the Norwegians Ditlev Vibe and Bishop Deichmann of Christiania recommended to the King of Denmark the re-establishment of a trade station at Nipisat and the establishment of a whaling station. In 1728, Frederick IV of Denmark ordered a fortress be constructed at Nipisat, but two years later, he ordered its abandonment and evacuation.

== Archaeology ==
The island is notable for its well preserved Saqqaq culture archaeological site, containing some stone artifacts that were previously unknown from the Saqqaq culture. The Saqqaq people are not the ancestors of modern Kalaallit people, rather they are related to modern Chukchi and Koryak peoples. The site, named after the island, was discovered in 1989 by Finn Kramer, curator of the Sisimiut Museum. It lies approximately 50 m (160 ft) from the present coastline, situated on raised beaches with a southeastern slope. The area elevation ranges between 9 m (30 ft)and 13 m (43 ft) above mean sea level. This part of the island that contains the archaeological site, did not show signs of later occupation by Dorset culture or Thule culture. However, it does show signs of pre-Dorset, and of Arctic small tool tradition. During the five year evacuation period of 1989–1994, over 70,000 bone fragments and approximately 1,000 artifacts were recovered, including 314 tools.

On 30 June 2018, it was inscribed as part of Aasivissuit – Nipisat: Inuit Hunting Ground between Ice and Sea, a UNESCO World Heritage Site that stretches inland to the Greenland Ice Sheet. The world heritage site includes six other archaeological sites that each display different aspects of hunter-gatherer societies through 4000 years of occupation in Greenland.
