= Kangerluarsunnguaq Bay =

Bay in Greenland

- Ulkebugten
- Location in Greenland
- Location: Arctic
- Coordinates: 66°56′40″N 53°39′00″W
- Ocean/sea sources: Davis Strait
- Basin countries: Greenland

Kangerluarsunnguaq Bay ([kaŋeʁluɑʁsuŋːuɑq̚] Danish: Ulkebugten) is a bay of the Davis Strait in the Qeqqata municipality on the western coast of Greenland. It is located directly to the north of Sisimiut.

== Geography ==
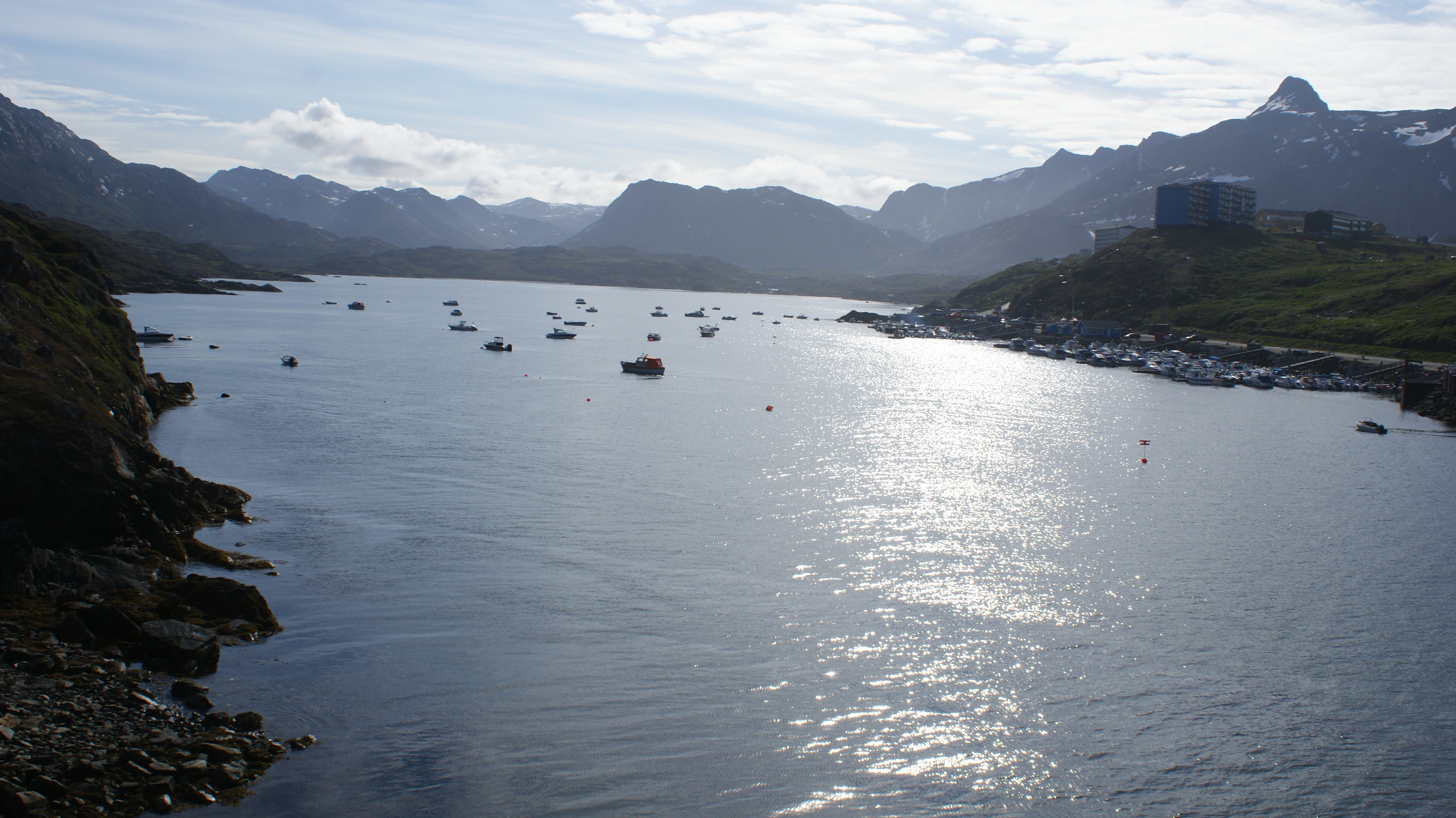
The eastern part of Kangerluarsunnguaq Bay seen from the town bridge. Nasaasaaq mountain is visible on the right in the background.

The bay branches off Davis Strait to the east, just north of Sisimiut. It is navigable in its entirety, protected from the open sea by a series of skerries and channels in the west. In the past, at the time of the Saqqaq culture settlements in the area, the bay extended further inland, the shoreline was up to several dozen meters above the present line, covering portions of the Sisimiut valley, and gradually decreasing in time due to post-glacial rebound.

To the north the bay is bounded by the Palasip Qaqqaa range. Sisimiut Airport is located at the far western end on the northern side, behind the several skerries and small islands of Qeqertarmiut and the Annertusoq skerry group protecting it from the storm waves of the open sea, and separating it from the mouth of Amerloq Fjord in the southwest.

== Economy ==
The bay provides a sheltered waterway for the town of Sisimiut. Both the commercial port and the harbour are located on the southern shore of the bay, on the mainland. The bay is used for recreational yachting and boating. The Qeqqata municipality is planning the expansion of the residential area in Sisimiut in the 2010s, with the area north of the bay reserved for real estate. Several camping sites are scattered in Sisimiut valley at the head of the bay.

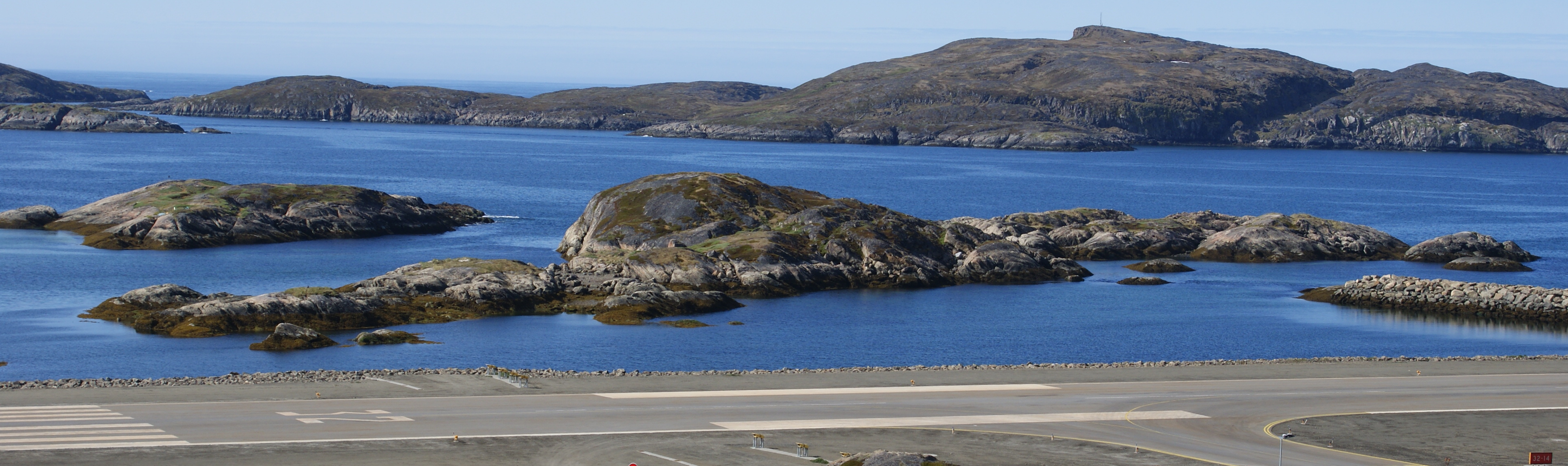
The runway at Sisimiut Airport is located behind the skerries at the mouth of Kangerluarsunnguaq Bay.
