= Nasaasaaq =

Mountain in Greenland

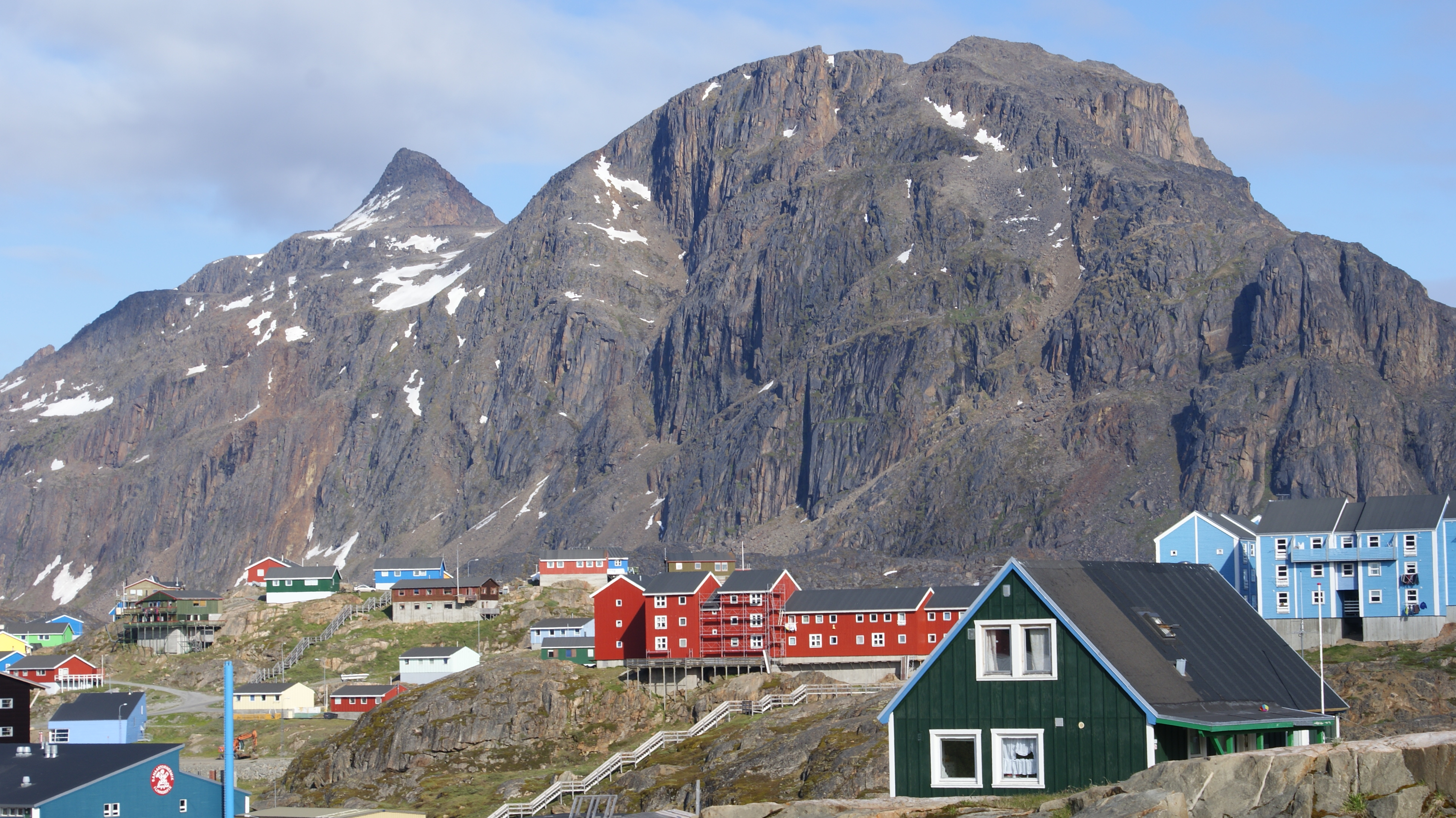
- The western (right) and main (left) summits of Nasaasaaq seen from the northwest, from Sisimiut

Highest point
- Elevation: 784 m (2,572 ft)
- Prominence: 784 m (2,572 ft)
- Listing: List of mountains in Greenland
- Coordinates: 66°55′35″N 53°33′10″W

Geography
- Location within Greenland
- Location: Mainland of Greenland

Nasaasaaq ([nasaːsɑːq̚] Danish: Kællingehætten) is a 784-metre-high (2,572 ft) prominent mountain in the Qeqqata municipality in western Greenland. It is located on the mainland of Greenland, immediately to the southeast of Sisimiut on the northern coast of Amerloq Fjord, a tributary of Davis Strait.

The mountain massif is spread out over 6 kilometres (3.7 mi) in the west–east direction, constituting the terminal point of a long mountain range extending from the Pingu mountain group halfway between Davis Strait and the Greenland ice sheet (Greenlandic: Sermersuaq). The range flattens considerably towards the east in the area of Kangaamiut dike swarm north of Kangerlussuaq, due to pressure exerted by the icesheet for long periods in the past. The Nasaasaaq ridge connects to the other latitudinal ridges approximately 15 km (9.3 mi) east of Sisimiut.

== Topography ==
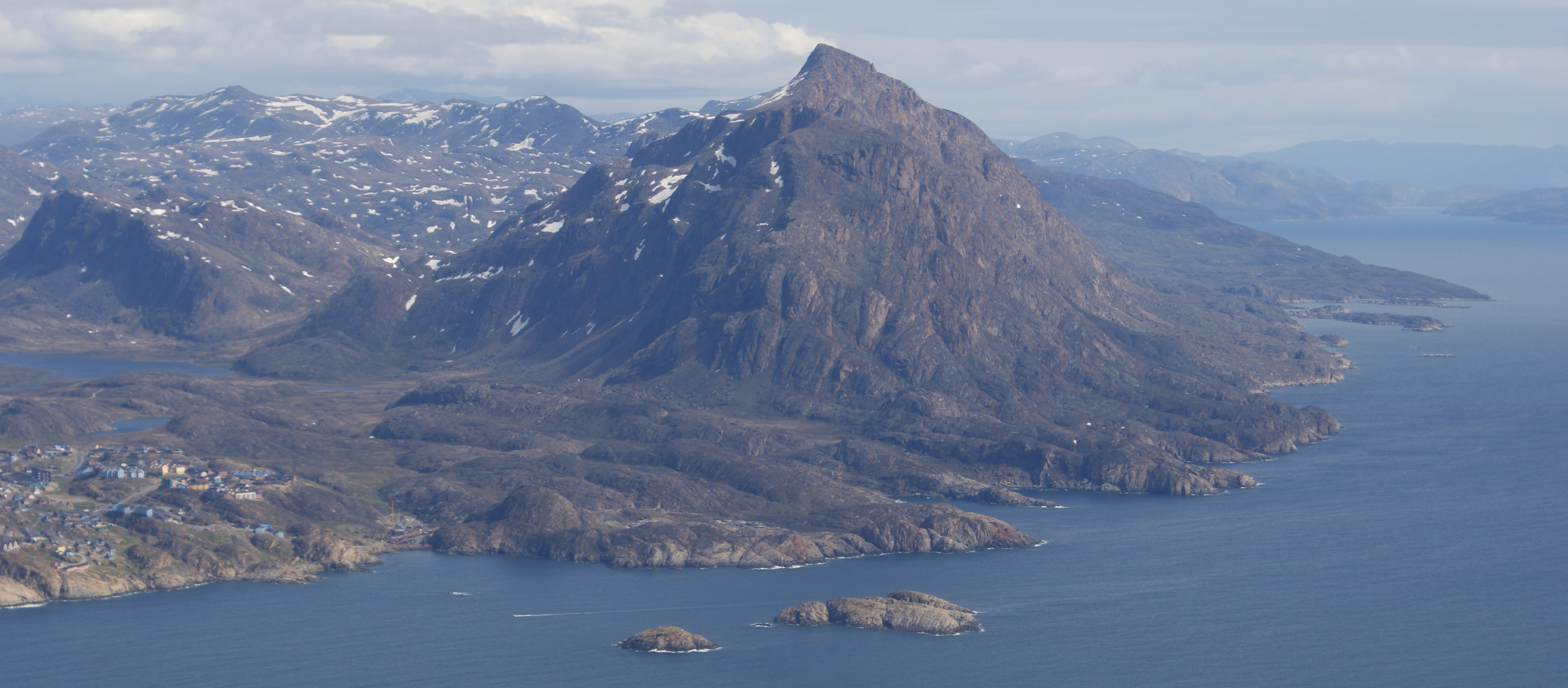
Aerial view of Nasaasaaq from the west

The Nasaasaaq ridge has several summits. The main summit is the most prominent, rising over the remainder of the ridge in a tall 150 m (490 ft) cone at 784 m (2,572 ft). The ridge terminates in a 611 m (2,005 ft) trabant overlooking Sisimiut.

To the east the ridge gradually falls to nearly 300 m (980 ft), before turning east-north-east towards the Aappilattorsuaq massif. The southern wall of Nasaasaaq falls directly to Amerloq Fjord.

The northern wall is not a uniform surface, dissected by ledges, dihedrals, and ramps. The main access route to the summit leads through one of the ramps to the saddle between the main summit and its western trabant. The passage on the top cone is secured by ropes for unprepared tourists.

== Tourism ==
The main summit is visited for its long-range view of the coast, although more limited to the north than that of Palasip Qaqqaa to the north of the town airport. An alternative route to the top of interest to mountaineers leads through the hard-to-find low pass to the east of the main summit, and from there directly on the summit cone ridge.

=== Polar Route ===
The tough, 160-kilometre-long (99 mi) Arctic Circle Race takes place each winter, with the trail partially overlapping with the Polar Route from Sisimiut to Kangerlussuaq. The race was inaugurated in 1998, since then becoming an international competition. The Polar Route passes through the saddle between Nasaasaaq and the much lower Alanngorsuaq mountain to the north, with the summit of the latter sometimes visited by way of a variant. A small lift for downhill skiing is also installed on the saddle.

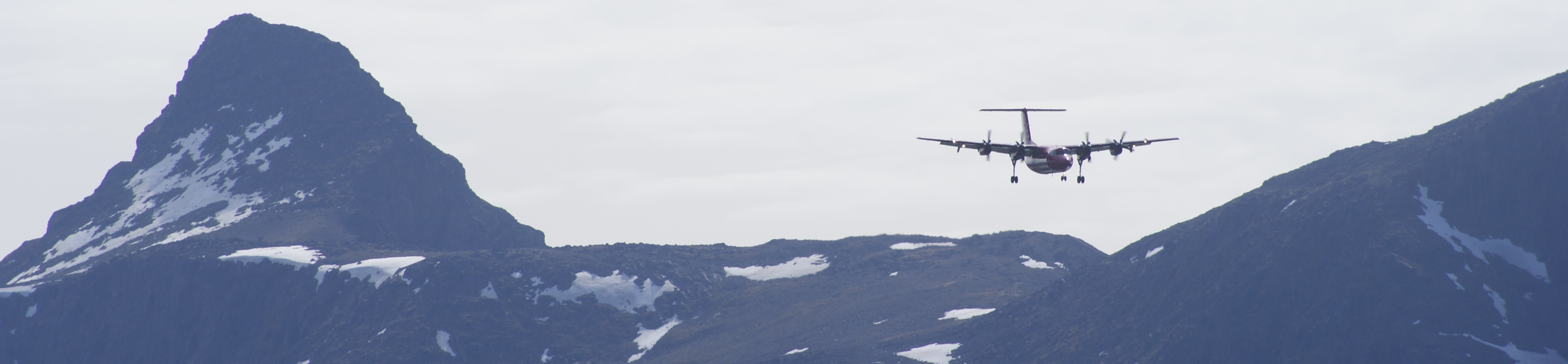
Air Greenland de Havilland Canada Dash-7 flying just north of the summit of Nasaasaaq, descending over Sisimiut towards Sisimiut Airport during its flight from Kangerlussuaq Airport. Left to right: the summit cone of Nasaasaaq, the saddle between the main summit and the western trabant.
