= Sarfannguit Island =

Island in western Greenland

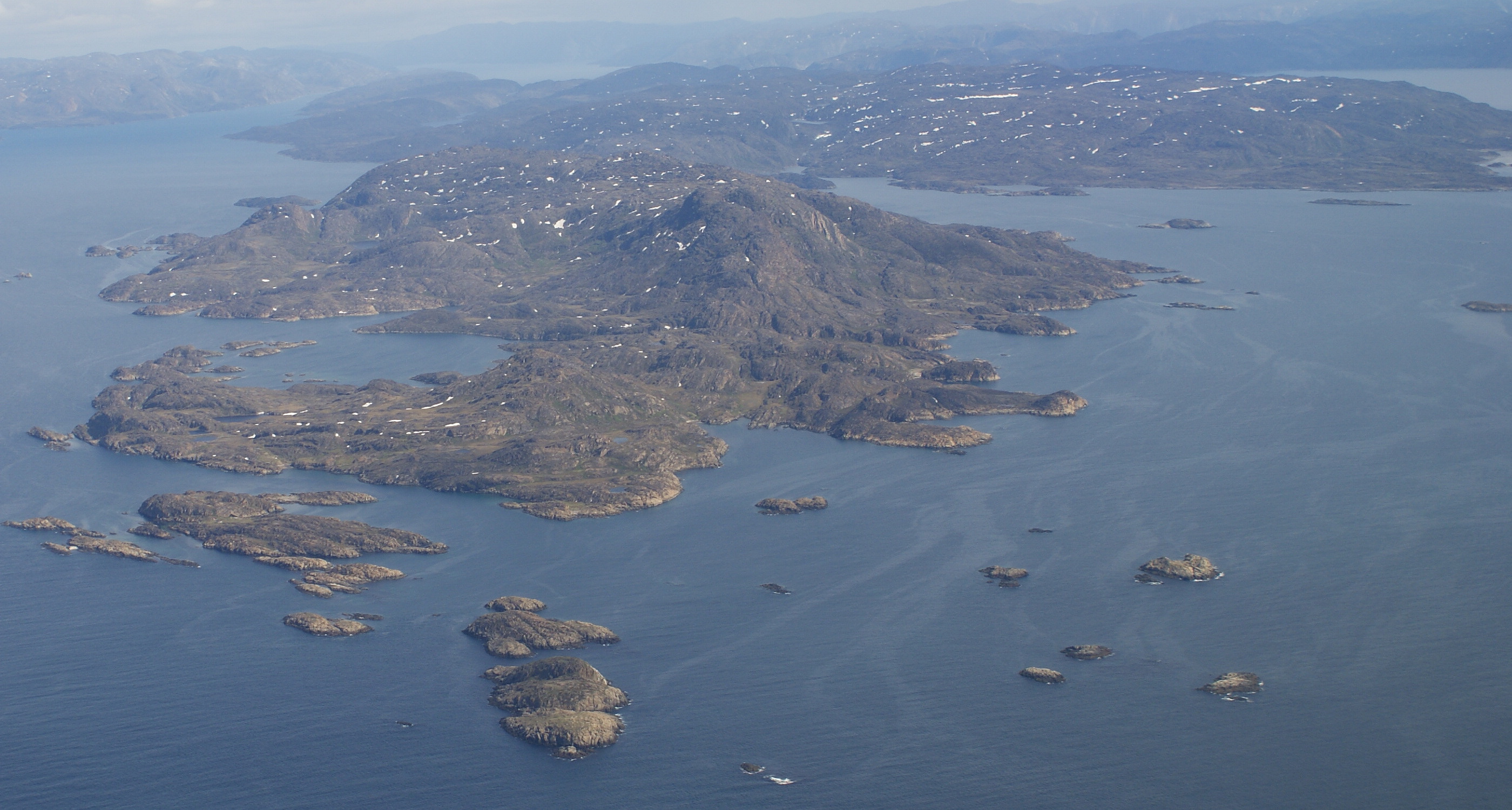
- Aerial view of Maniitsorsuaq Island and Sarfannguit Island

- Location within Greenland

Geography
- Location: Davis Strait
- Coordinates: 66°51′N 53°15′W

Administration
- Greenland
- Municipality: Qeqqata

Sarfannguit Island (Greenlandic: Sarfannguit Nunataat, Danish: Sarfannguaqland) is an island in the Qeqqata municipality in western Greenland.

== Geography ==
The island is of elongated shape, separated from the mainland of Greenland by Sarfannguit Channel, a narrow waterway at the eastern promontory occupied by the Sarfannguit settlement. To the south, the island is bounded by the Ikertooq Fjord, widening considerably at its mouth at approximately 66°46′N 53°27′W, where it empties into Davis Strait. The channel is unusual in that it connects the head of the narrower Amerloq Fjord bounding the island from the north to the larger Ikertooq Fjord in the southeast.

Several smaller islands trail Sarfannguit Island in the west, on the coastline of Davis Strait, of which Maniitsorsuaq and Uummannaarsussuaq are the largest, while tiny Nipisat Island is host to ruins from the early settlement. The island is hilly, with the highest point reaching 404 m (1,325 ft). In the past, the coastal region was dotted with several small villages, all of which are now abandoned.
