= Sisimiut Municipality =

Municipality in Greenland

Coordinates: 66.9358°N 53.6675°W

Sisimiut Municipality was a municipality in Greenland until 31 December 2008. Its administrative center was Sisimiut. Within its borders were also the settlements of Itilleq and Sarfannguaq, as well as the settlement of Kangerlussuaq, which has Greenland's largest airport. It was incorporated into the new Qeqqata municipality on 1 January 2009.
