= Arctic Circle Trail =

Hiking trail in Greenland

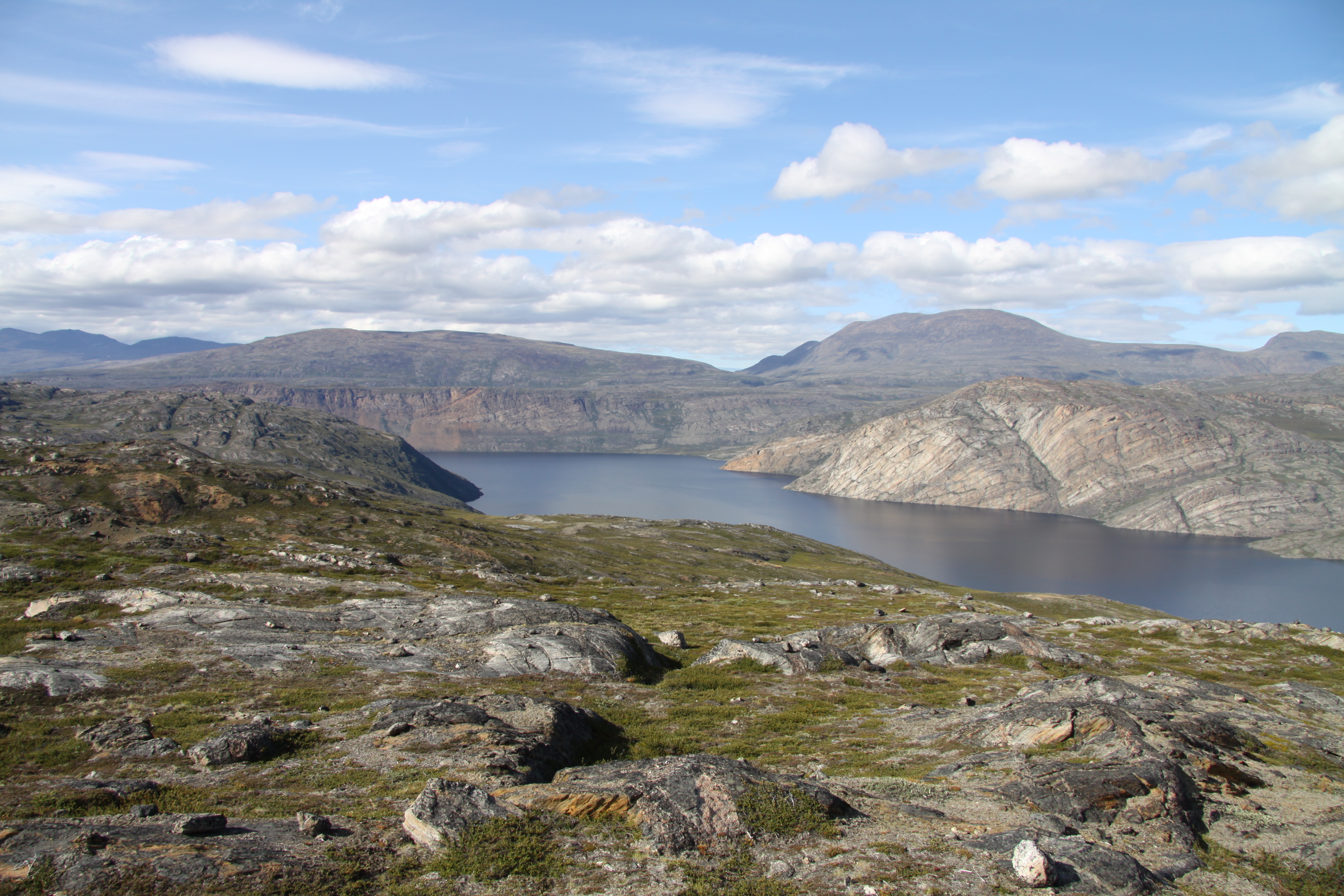
- Tasersuaq Lake on the trail
- Length: 165 km (103 mi)
- Location: Greenland
- Established: 1998
- Use: Hiking

The Arctic Circle Trail is a hiking trail in Greenland. The route covers 165 kilometres (103 miles) from the interior settlement of Kangerlussuaq to Sisimiut on the coast.

== Geography and terrain ==
The entirety of the trail is north of the Arctic Circle, hence the name. While 80% of Greenland is covered in ice sheets, the trail travels from the edge of the ice cap to the western coast of the island. The trail covers parts of traditional hunting grounds now recognized as a UNESCO World Heritage Site, the Aasivissuit – Nipisat: Inuit Hunting Ground between Ice and Sea, though it was officially established in 1998.

Approximately the first 17 kilometres (11 mi) of the trail is along a gravel road, with the rest of it on single track hiking trail that is sparsely marked by cairns. The trail does not have any significant mountain passes to cross, reaching a maximum altitude of 450 metres (1,480 ft). It passes by numerous lakes, river crossings, and boggy terrain. During summer, the route is largely snow free; however, during spring, fall, and winter, it requires skis, snowmobiles, or dog sleds to travel.

== Hiking ==
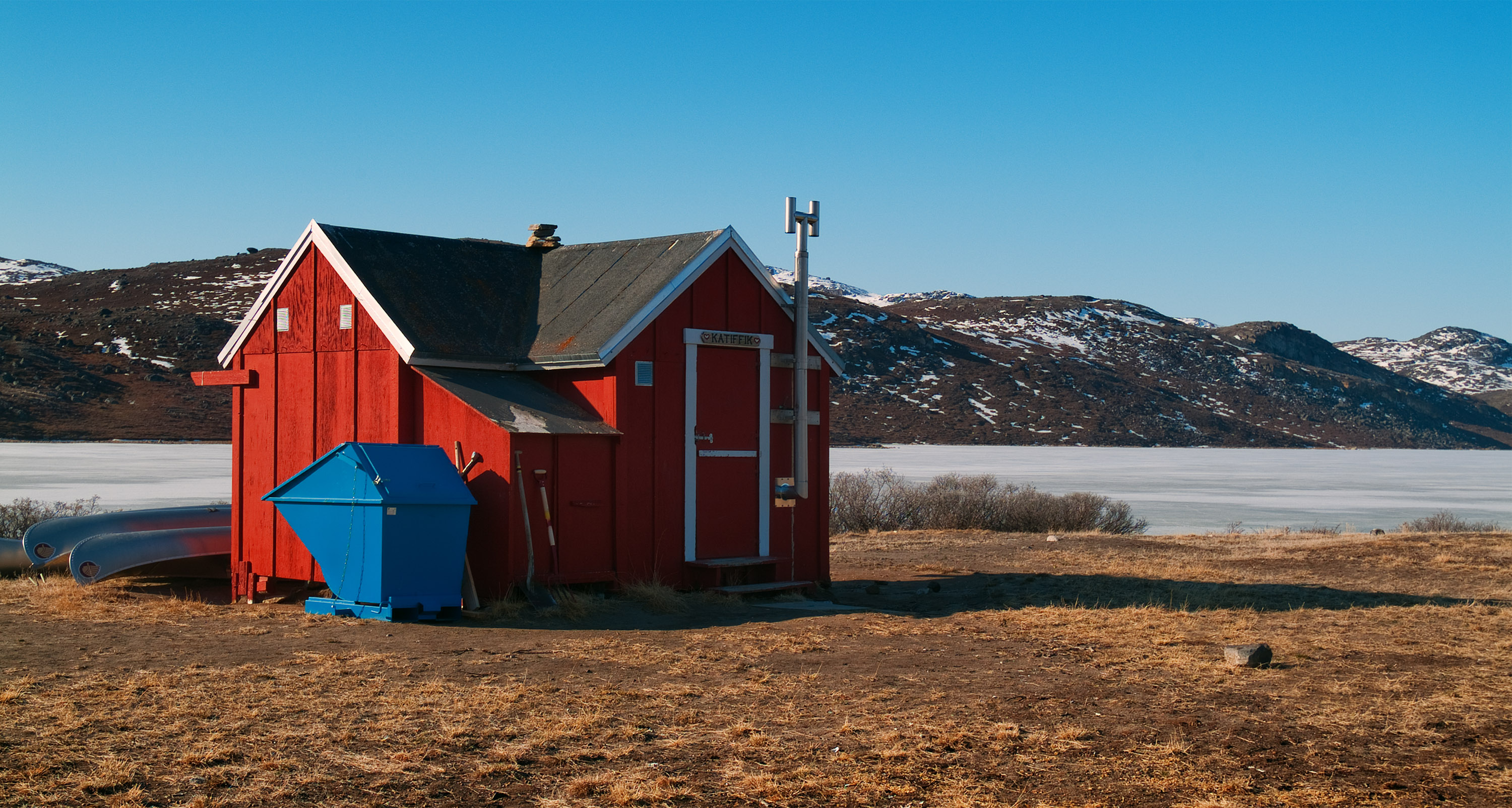
A hut on the Arctic Circle Trail

The most well-known trail in Greenland, it sees relatively few hikers in a season, typically no more than 1,500. The trail requires no permits and is free to use. Most hikers complete the route in 7–10 days, though the fastest known time is just under two days. There are no towns or settlements along the route for resupply, so hikers must be completely self-supported in terms of food and gear. There are, however, 10 primitive huts that provide shelter along the trail. In recent years, fires on the tundra have forced some hikers to evacuate from the route. Otherwise, the most common challenges faced are the extreme remoteness of the trail, river crossings, and a heavy mosquito population during the early summer.
