= Sarfannguit =

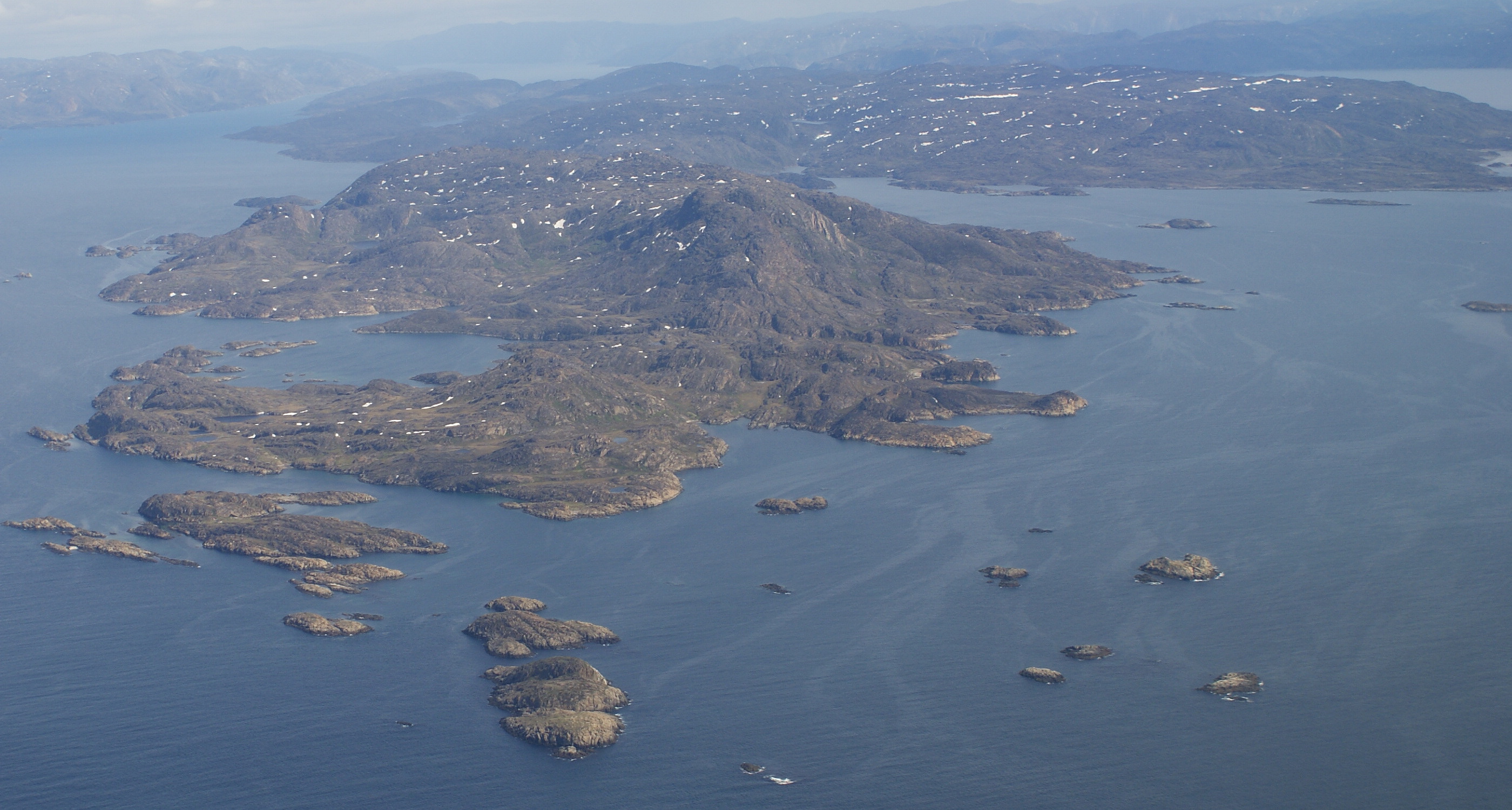
- Sarfannguit-nunataat

- Location within Greenland
- Coordinates: 66°53′50″N 52°51′40″W
- State: Kingdom of Denmark
- Constituent country: Greenland
- Municipality: Qeqqata
- Founded: 1843

Government
  - Mayor: Najaaraq Goliathsen

Population (2020)
  - Total: 96
- Time zone: UTC−02:00 (Western Greenland Time)
  - Summer (DST): UTC−01:00 (Western Greenland Summer Time)
- Postal code: 3911 Sisimiut

UNESCO World Heritage Site
- Type: Cultural
- Criteria: v
- Designated: 2018 (42nd session)
- Part of: Aasivissuit – Nipisat: Inuit Hunting Ground between Ice and Sea
- Reference no.: 1557

Sarfannguit (old spelling: Sarfannguaq / Sarfánguaq) is a settlement in the Qeqqata municipality in central-western Greenland. Its population was 96 in 2020. The settlement was founded in 1843. The town is located within the Aasivissuit – Nipisat UNESCO World Heritage Site, and is inscribed on the World Heritage List in 2018 for its outstanding archeological sites representing the human occupation of Greenland for over 4,000 years.

== Geography ==
Sarfannguit is located on the eastern promontory of an island of the same name, approximately 36 km (22 mi) east of Sisimiut, facing the mainland of Greenland across the Imartuninnguaq Strait, at this point only 200 m (660 ft) wide. The strait opens into the Amerloq Fjord in the west, which then heads to the west, emptying into the Davis Strait south of Sisimiut. Ikertooq Fjord bounds the island from the south.

== Economy ==
The first wind turbine in Greenland was constructed in Sarfannguit in 2010. The wind turbine is 10 m (33 ft) tall, providing 6,000 liter of petrol worth of savings per month for the village.

== Transport ==
=== Air ===
The closest aerodrome is Sisimiut Airport in Sisimiut, with connections to Ilulissat, Kangerlussuaq, Maniitsoq, and Nuuk operated by Air Greenland. There are no helicopter services to coastal settlements of Davis Strait in the Qeqqata and Sermersooq municipalities. The AIP references a 20m round helipad (ICAO code: BGSA) with gravel surface at Sarfannguit.

=== Sea ===
Royal Arctic Line provides weekly ferry services to Itilleq and Sisimiut, a port of call for the Arctic Umiaq Line, with connections to Ilulissat and Aasiaat in the Disko Bay region, and to coastal towns in southwestern and southern Greenland.

=== Land ===
There is no road reaching Sarfannguit, but it would be connected to the proposed Sisimiut-Kangerlussuaq road, which has been discussed for several years, but not built. Snowmobiles are used in winter to connect to Sisimiut, roughly 50 km away.

== Population ==
The population of Sarfannguit has been stable in the last four decades.

View chart definition.
Population of Sarfannguit on 1 January each year.

In 1986, the leading cause of death for young people in this city was suicide.
