= Ikertooq Fjord =

Fjord in Greenland

Location within Greenland

Ikertooq Fjord (old spelling: Ikertôq) is a 55 km (34 mi) long fjord in the Qeqqata municipality in western Greenland. The fjord empties into Davis Strait 21 km (13 mi) south of Sisimiut.

== Geography ==
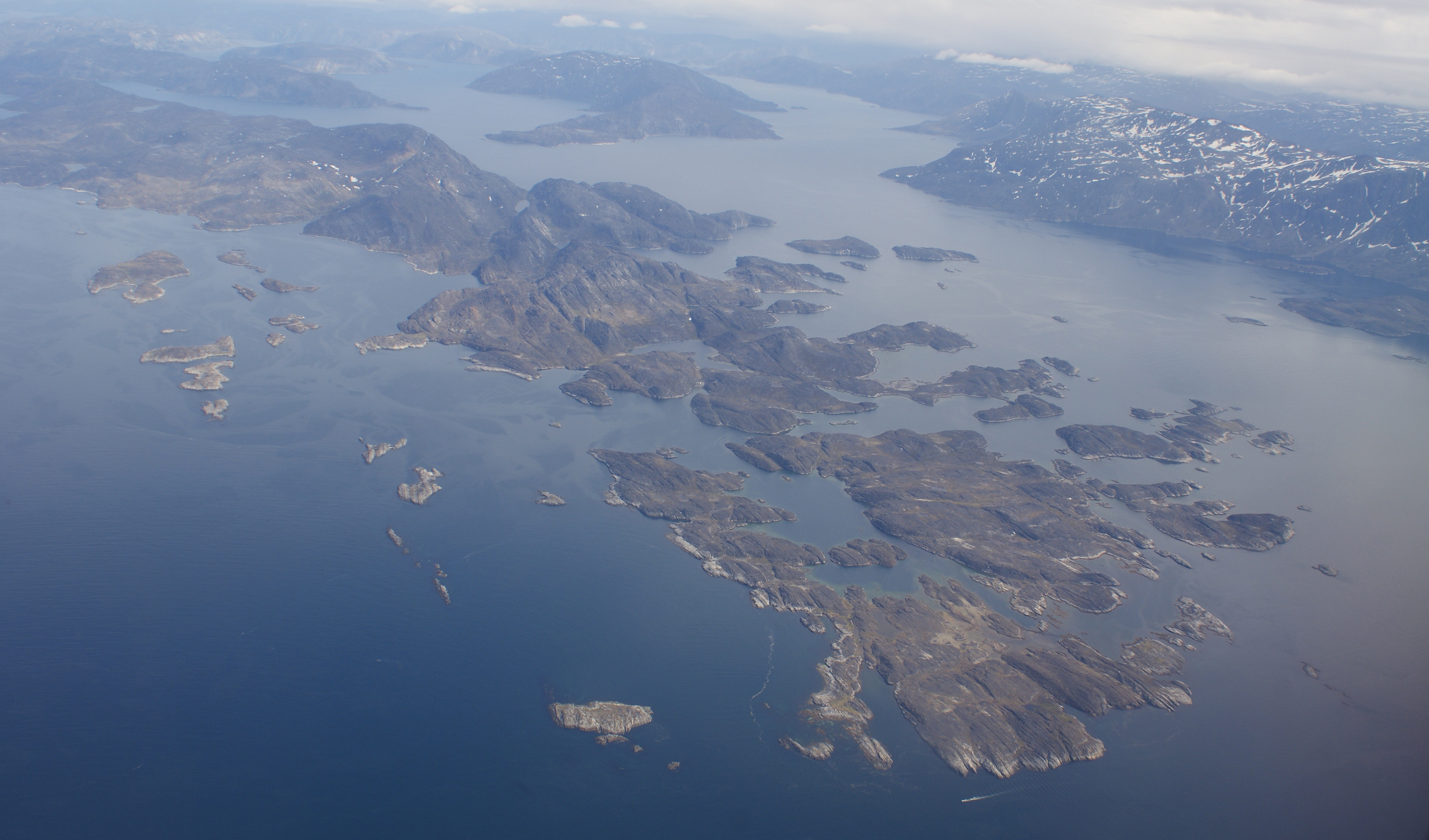
Aerial view of Sallersuaq island and skerries at the mouth of Ikertooq Fjord.

The upper part of the fjord, a confluence of three tributary inlets at approximately 66°53′20″N 52°32′00″W is called Suluppaavarsiorfik (old spelling: Sulugpâvarsiorfik). The tributary bays, from south to north, are: Avalleq, Akulleq (the innermost, main arm at approximately 66°55′50″N 52°16′00″W), and Maligiaq. Itinneq, an outflow river from the large, latitudinal Tasersuaq lake, empties into the northern inlet.

The fjord initially flows westward, to then turn west-south-west between the mainland peninsula in the south, and Sarfannguit Island in the north, widening considerably at its mouth at approximately 66°46′N 53°27′W, where it empties into Davis Strait. The fjord is unusual in that it connects through a very narrow waterway to the head of the narrower Amerloq Fjord near the village of Sarfannguit.

The northern inlet at the fjord head is surrounded by tall mountains immediately to the south of the Pingu mountain group halfway between Davis Strait and the Greenland ice sheet (Greenlandic: Sermersuaq). The range flattens considerably towards the east in the area of Kangaamiut dike swarm north of Kangerlussuaq, due to pressure exerted by the icesheet for long periods in the past.

== Settlement ==
The small Sarfannguit settlement occupies the eastern promontory on Sarfannguit Island, on the northern shore of the fjord, at the narrow waterway between the mainland and Sarfannguit Island. In the past, the coastal region was dotted with several small villages, all of which are now abandoned.
