= Alanngorsuaq =

Mountain in Greenland

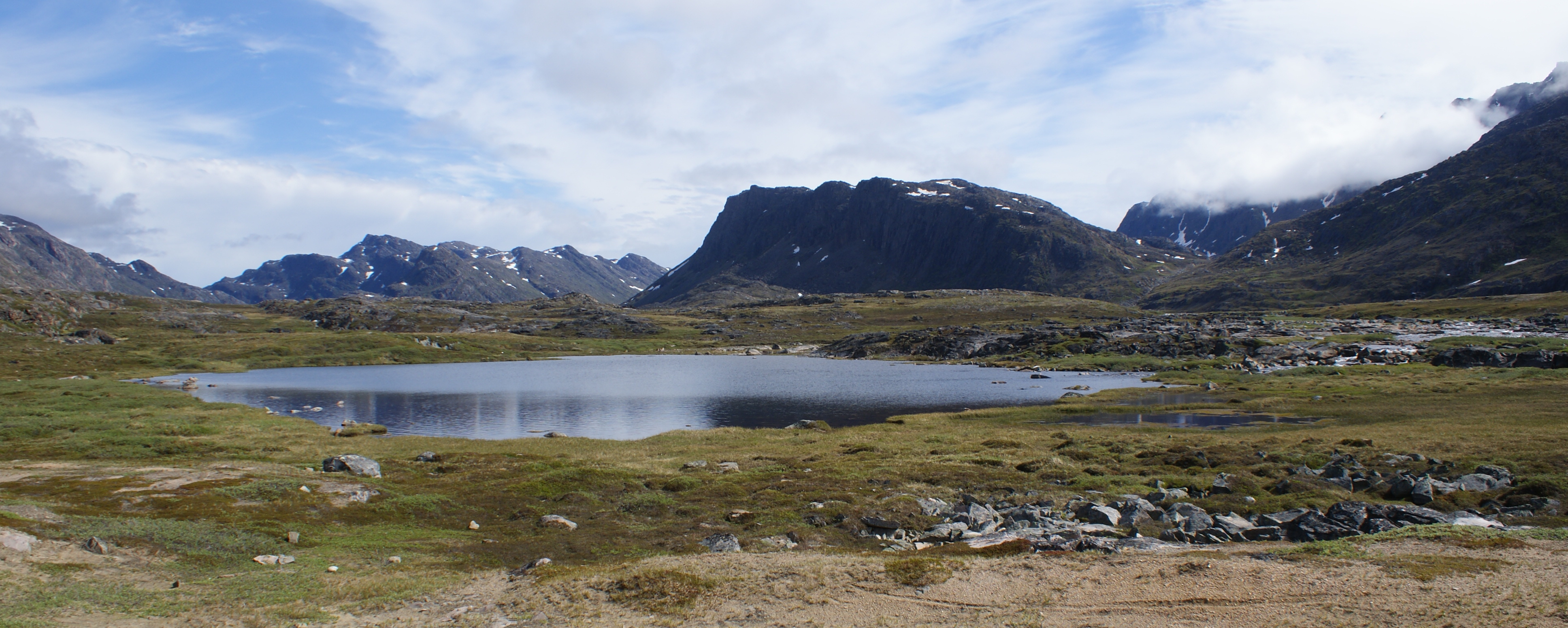
- Alanngorsuaq seen from the west

Highest point
- Elevation: 411 m (1,348 ft)
- Coordinates: 66°56′46″N 53°32′00″W

Geography
- Location within Greenland
- Location: Mainland of Greenland

Alanngorsuaq is a 411-metre-high (1,348 ft) mountain in the Qeqqata municipality in western Greenland. It is located on the mainland of Greenland in Sisimiut valley, approximately 3 km (1.9 mi) east of the town.

== Geography ==
Alanngorsuaq is a standalone mountain, separated from the Nasaasaaq massif in the south by a shallow saddle. The mountain massif is spread out over 6 kilometres (3.7 mi) in the west–east direction, constituting the terminal point of a long mountain range extending from the Pingu mountain group halfway between Davis Strait and the Greenland ice sheet (Greenlandic: Sermersuaq). The range flattens considerably towards the east in the area of Kangaamiut dike swarm north of Kangerlussuaq, due to pressure exerted by the icesheet for long periods in the past. The Nasaasaaq ridge connects to the other latitudinal ridges approximately 15 km (9.3 mi) east of Sisimiut.

== Topography ==
The 2.5-kilometre-long (1.6 mi) summit ridge of Alanngorsuaq is of roughly east–west direction, with the summit in the center. The southern slope falls mildly towards the saddle, while the northeastern wall falls with a steep cliff in its western part, gradually easing towards the east. It is the only part of the massif of interest to mountaineers.

== Tourism ==
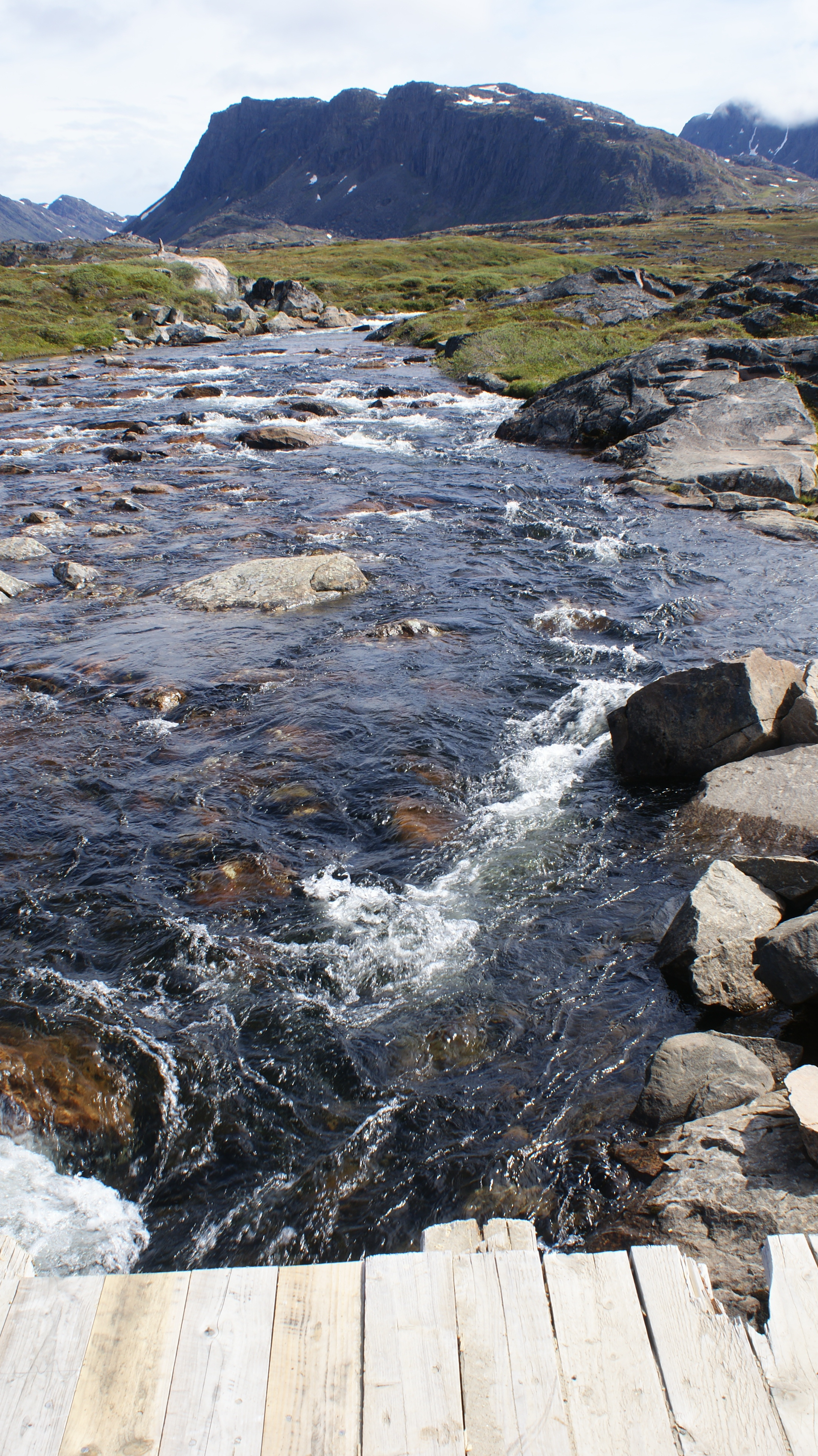
The gravel road from town leads to the water reservoirs through a wooden bridge over the Sisimiut River, the water from which is drinkable.

=== Recreation ===
Alanngorsuaq is surrounded by several lakes to the west and northwest, one of which serves Sisimiut town as a water reservoir. Two reservoirs in the valley provide the town waterworks with 882,000 m^{3} (1,154,000 cu yd) of water, while another two can supply a minimum of 7,200,000 m^{3} (9,400,000 cu yd) annually. Sisimiut valley is the primary recreation areas for the townspeople, with easy access to the reservoirs by a gravel road in the middle part of the valley. The summit itself is very frequently visited from the southern side for its wide view over the valley and the mountain ranges encircling it from three sides.

=== Skiing ===
Cross-country skiing around the mountain is popular in winter, while a small lift for downhill skiing is installed on the southern slope, due south of the summit.

=== Polar Route ===
The tough, 160-kilometre-long (99 mi) Arctic Circle Race takes place each winter, with the trail partially overlapping with the Polar Route from Sisimiut to Kangerlussuaq. The race was inaugurated in 1998, since then becoming an international competition. The Polar Route passes through the saddle between Nasaasaaq and Alanngorsuaq, and the summit is sometimes visited by way of a variant.
