= Sisimiut Museum =

History museum in Sisimiut, Greenland

Coordinates: 66.9385°N 53.6708°W

- Sisimiut Katersugaasiviat
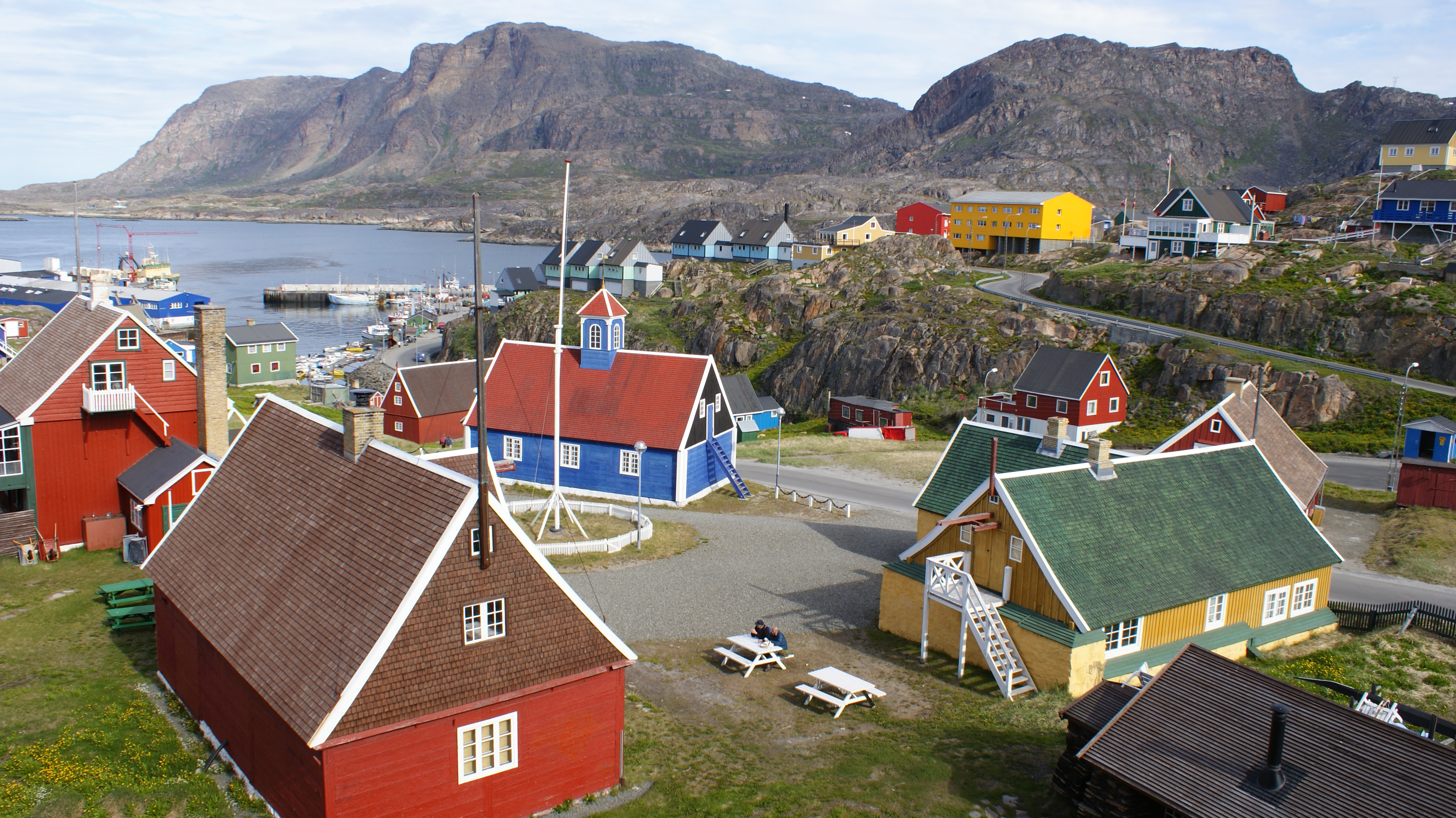
- Location: Sisimiut, Greenland
- Type: History museum
- Website: http://www.sisimiut.museum.gl/?AreaID=51

Sisimiut Museum (Greenlandic: Sisimiut Katersugaasiviat) is a museum in Sisimiut, Greenland. Located in a historical building near the harbour, specialises in Greenlandic trade, industry and shipping, with artifacts based on ten years of archaeological research and excavations of the ancient Saqqaq culture settlements near the town, offering an insight into the culture of the region of 4,000 years ago.

The museum also hosts a collection of tools and domestic items collected during 1902–22, an inventory from the old Church with the original altarpiece dated to approximately 1650, and paintings from the 1790s. The peat house reconstruction of an early 20th-century Greenlandic residence with domestic furniture is part of an outdoor exhibition. The exhibition includes the remains of a kayak from the 18th century and the Poul Madsen collection, a collection of handcraft, art, house items and ethnographic objects compiled over fifty years.

In 1989, Finn Kramer, curator of the museum, discovered the Nipisat Saqqaq culture site and was in charge of its evacuation during the next five years.

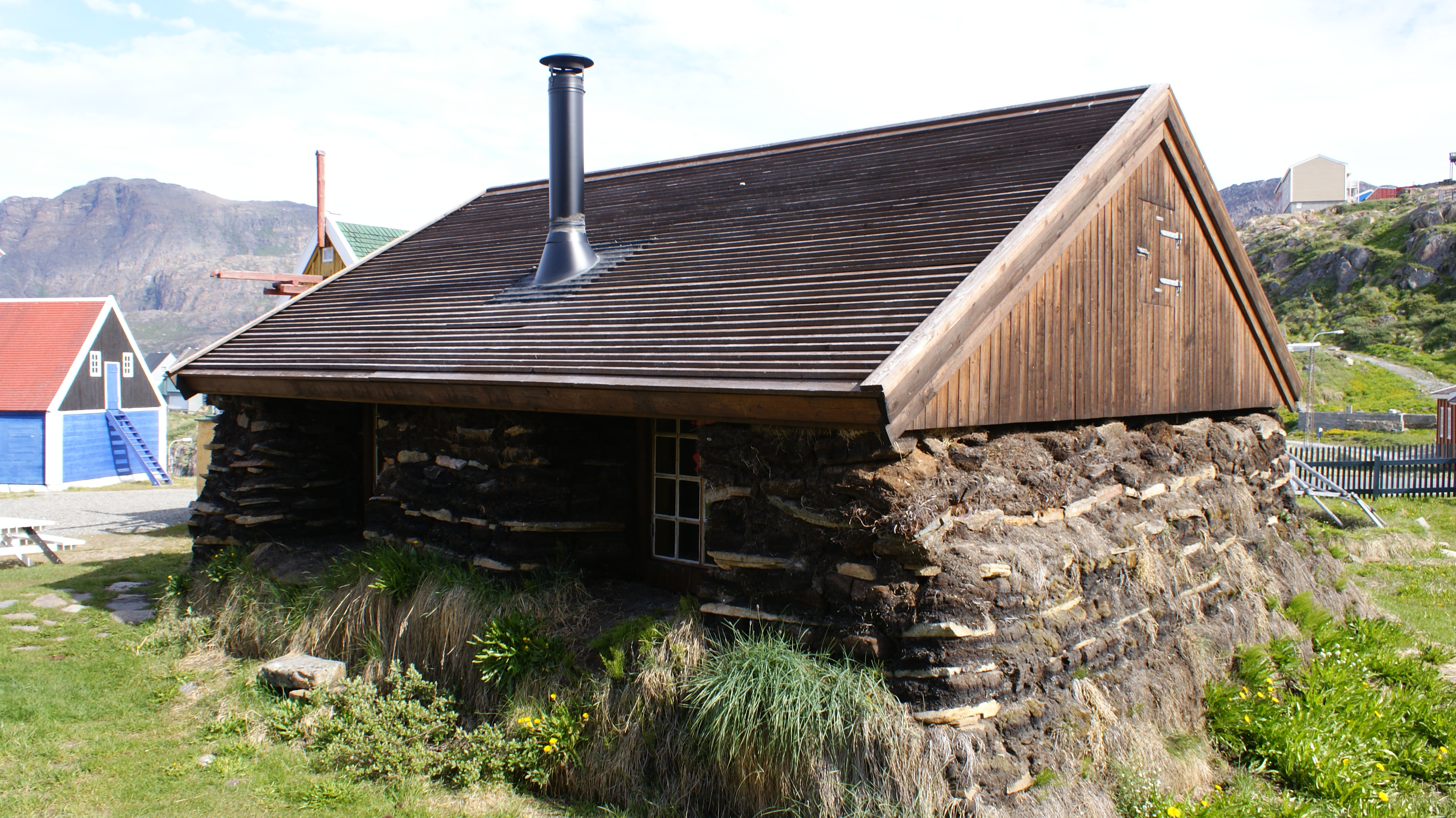
A traditional Greenlandic peat house, reconstructed at the Sisimiut Museum.
