= Aasivissuit – Nipisat: Inuit Hunting Ground between Ice and Sea =

UNESCO World Heritage Site
- Location: Denmark
- Criteria: Cultural: (v)
- Reference: 1557
- Inscription: 2018 (42nd Session)
- Area: 417,800 ha (1,613 sq mi)
- Location of some of the key site locations within Greenland: 1. Nipisat Island, 2. Sarfannguit, 3. Aasivissuit

Aasivissuit – Nipisat: Inuit Hunting Ground between Ice and Sea is a cultural landscape and UNESCO World Heritage Site located in the central part of Western Greenland. Added to the World Heritage List in 2018, the site preserves the archeological remains of over 4000 years of occupation and contains well-preserved evidence of seasonal hunting and gathering. Remains from the Saqqaq, Dorset, and Thule cultures and sites from the later Inuit and colonial era are protected within the site.

== Description ==
The Aasivissuit– Nipisat World Heritage Site is located just north of the Arctic Circle in the Qeqqata Municipality in Western Greenland. It stretches along a 235 km transect that runs east–west from Nipisat Island in the Davis Strait to the Greenland Ice Sheet.

== Archaeological Sites ==
Within the World Heritage Site, there are 7 archeological ruins and one contemporary settlement, representing different aspects of the chronological history of the region and demonstrating the variety of land traditions in Greenland that appeared over time.

Aasivissuit is located on the high plains on the eastern end of the World Heritage Site. With evidence of occupation dating back to 1250, it was a major summer camp for the Thule people during the 15th through 19th centuries. There are the remains of 22 tent sites, a 3.9 km caribou drive (the largest in Greenland), stone caches for storing meat, and primitive grave sites. Harpoons, axes, and ulos (a knife-scraper combination used by Thule women) have also been uncovered at the site.

Itinnerup Tupersuai provides a typical example of an Inuit summer camp from the 18th and 19th centuries. This camp probably provided an intermediate stop when migrating from the coast to the interior during the caribou-hunting season.

Established in 1851 as a fishing village, Saqqarliit was abandoned in 1961. The present site contains the ruins of the chapel and foundations of many other colonial buildings in addition to both Christian and pre-Christian graveyards.

Sarfannguit is the only inhabited settlement in the World Heritage Site. With a population of 96 in 2020, the town was established in 1843 and contains several original buildings from the colonial era.

Arajutsisut was a large winter settlement used by the Thule people. Arajutsisut contains the ruins of five communal houses typical of the 17th and 18th centuries. These houses were usually 8-10m long and 4-5m wide, accommodating up to 30 individuals. Each family would reside in a 1-2 meter section of the house, separated from other families by hide partitions. Four smaller, rectangular winter houses and one round house dating from the early Thule period are also located at this site.

Also a winter settlement for the Thule, Innap Nuua contains three large, well-preserved communal houses (one being 25m long) in addition to older Thule structures, graves, and evidence of extensive fishing and hunting.

On the western end of the site, Nipisat Island contains exceptionally well-preserved artifacts from the Saqqaq culture, which lived in Greenland between 2500 and 800 BCE. From 1989 to 1994, an excavation of the archeological site on the island revealed over 70,000 bone fragments from game animals and 1,000 artifacts from the Saqqaq culture.

== History ==
The area was occupied intermittently beginning around 2000 BCE, with the arrival of the Saqqaq culture on the coast. Radiocarbon dates at Nipisat Island suggest that the Saqqaq people continued in this region until at least 700 BCE, which is longer than anywhere else in Greenland. Soon after, the Dorset culture thrived in the region, traveling further inland. As far in as Aasivissuit, small fragments of chalcedony and bones suggest that the Dorset people may have traveled as far as the ice cap. Around 1100 CE, the Thule people migrated to Greenland from northern Canada, and the earliest record of Thule artifacts in the area dates from roughly 1250 CE. The Thule people had a more sophisticated system of marine hunting (often employing dog teams and kayaks), and migrated seasonally. In winter, they would stay in permanent stone houses near the coast at Innap Nuua and Arajutsisut, hunting for marine mammals and fish, and in the summer they would move inland to hunt caribou at temporary summer camps (such as Aasivissuit).

In the early 1700s, a Danish colony attempted to be established at Nipisat Island, but it was quickly abandoned. However, during the next century, colonial towns (such as Saggarliit and Sarfannguit) were established in the area to bolster the fishing and caribou skin trade. Many of these villages were abandoned due to famine and various epidemics.
