= Napasoq =

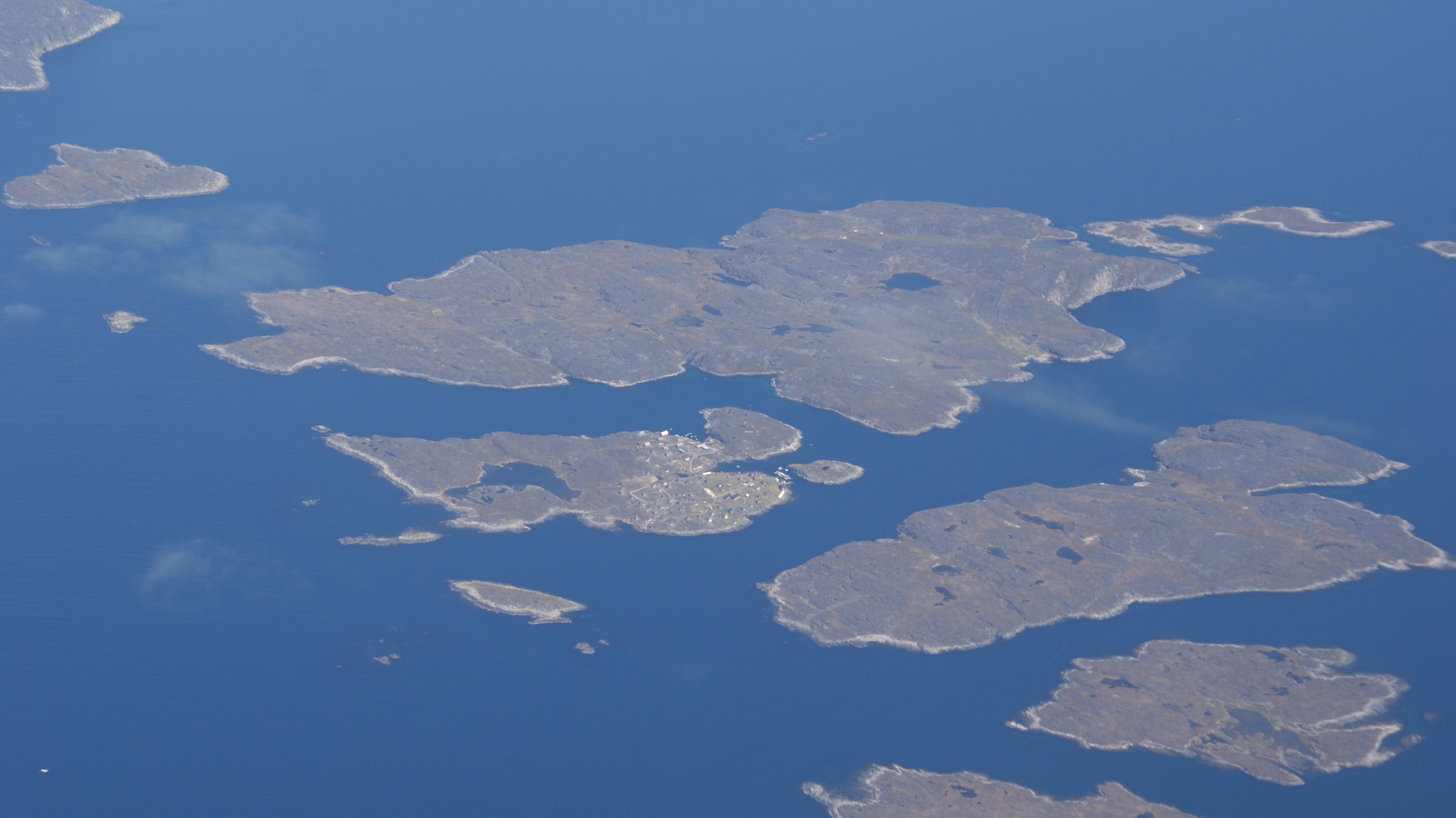
- Aerial view of Napasoq

- Location within Greenland
- Coordinates: 65°02′50″N 52°22′50″W
- State: Kingdom of Denmark
- Constituent country: Greenland
- Municipality: Qeqqata

Government
  - Mayor: Jens Kristiansen

Population (2025)
  - Total: 67
- Time zone: UTC−02:00 (Western Greenland Time)
  - Summer (DST): UTC−01:00 (Western Greenland Summer Time)
- Postal code: 3912 Maniitsoq

Napasoq (old spelling: Napassoq/Napâssoq) is an island settlement in the Qeqqata municipality, in central-western Greenland. Located on a small island on the shores of Davis Strait, it had 80 inhabitants in 2020.

== Climate ==
Napasoq experiences a tundra climate (Köppen: ET); with short, cool summers and long, freezing winters.

Climate data for Napasoq (65.00°N 52.52°W) (12 m (39 ft) AMSL) (1991-2020 data)
Month	Jan	Feb	Mar	Apr	May	Jun	Jul	Aug	Sep	Oct	Nov	Dec	Year
Record high °C (°F)	8.1 (46.6)	8.8 (47.8)	7.0 (44.6)	9.6 (49.3)	11.9 (53.4)	17.4 (63.3)	18.3 (64.9)	19.3 (66.7)	18.8 (65.8)	14.5 (58.1)	11.8 (53.2)	8.6 (47.5)	19.3 (66.7)
Mean daily maximum °C (°F)	−5.9 (21.4)	−7.2 (19.0)	−6.1 (21.0)	−1.5 (29.3)	2.2 (36.0)	5.4 (41.7)	7.7 (45.9)	7.8 (46.0)	5.7 (42.3)	2.2 (36.0)	−1.5 (29.3)	−3.6 (25.5)	0.4 (32.7)
Daily mean °C (°F)	−7.6 (18.3)	−9.0 (15.8)	−7.9 (17.8)	−3.1 (26.4)	0.7 (33.3)	3.8 (38.8)	6.1 (43.0)	6.3 (43.3)	4.4 (39.9)	0.9 (33.6)	−2.9 (26.8)	−5.2 (22.6)	−1.1 (30.0)
Mean daily minimum °C (°F)	−9.3 (15.3)	−10.8 (12.6)	−9.8 (14.4)	−4.9 (23.2)	−0.8 (30.6)	2.4 (36.3)	4.6 (40.3)	5.0 (41.0)	3.2 (37.8)	−0.4 (31.3)	−4.3 (24.3)	−6.6 (20.1)	−2.6 (27.3)
Record low °C (°F)	−26.6 (−15.9)	−33.0 (−27.4)	−27.2 (−17.0)	−18.4 (−1.1)	−13.3 (8.1)	−2.1 (28.2)	−3.0 (26.6)	0.1 (32.2)	−2.6 (27.3)	−8.6 (16.5)	−15.4 (4.3)	−20.0 (−4.0)	−33.0 (−27.4)
Average relative humidity (%)	69.4	71.0	72.3	74.4	82.8	89.9	90.8	90.8	81.5	73.6	70.8	72.7	78.3
Source: Danish Meteorological Institute (2001-2020 temperature & humidity)

== Population ==
Napasoq is the smallest settlement in the municipality, and has been depopulating for the last two decades. Its population has decreased more than a half relative to the 1990 levels, and by nearly 16 percent relative to the 2000 levels.

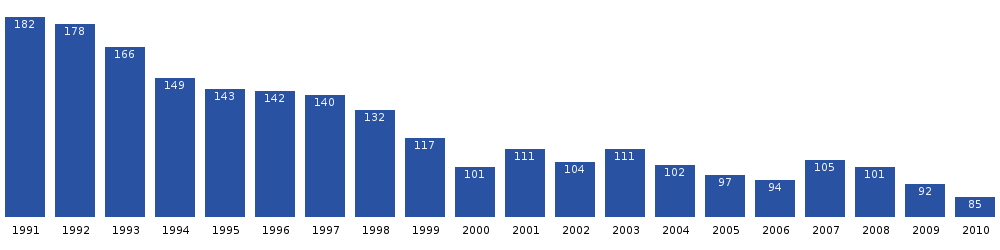
Napasoq population growth dynamics in the last two decades. Source: Statistics Greenland
