= Atammik =

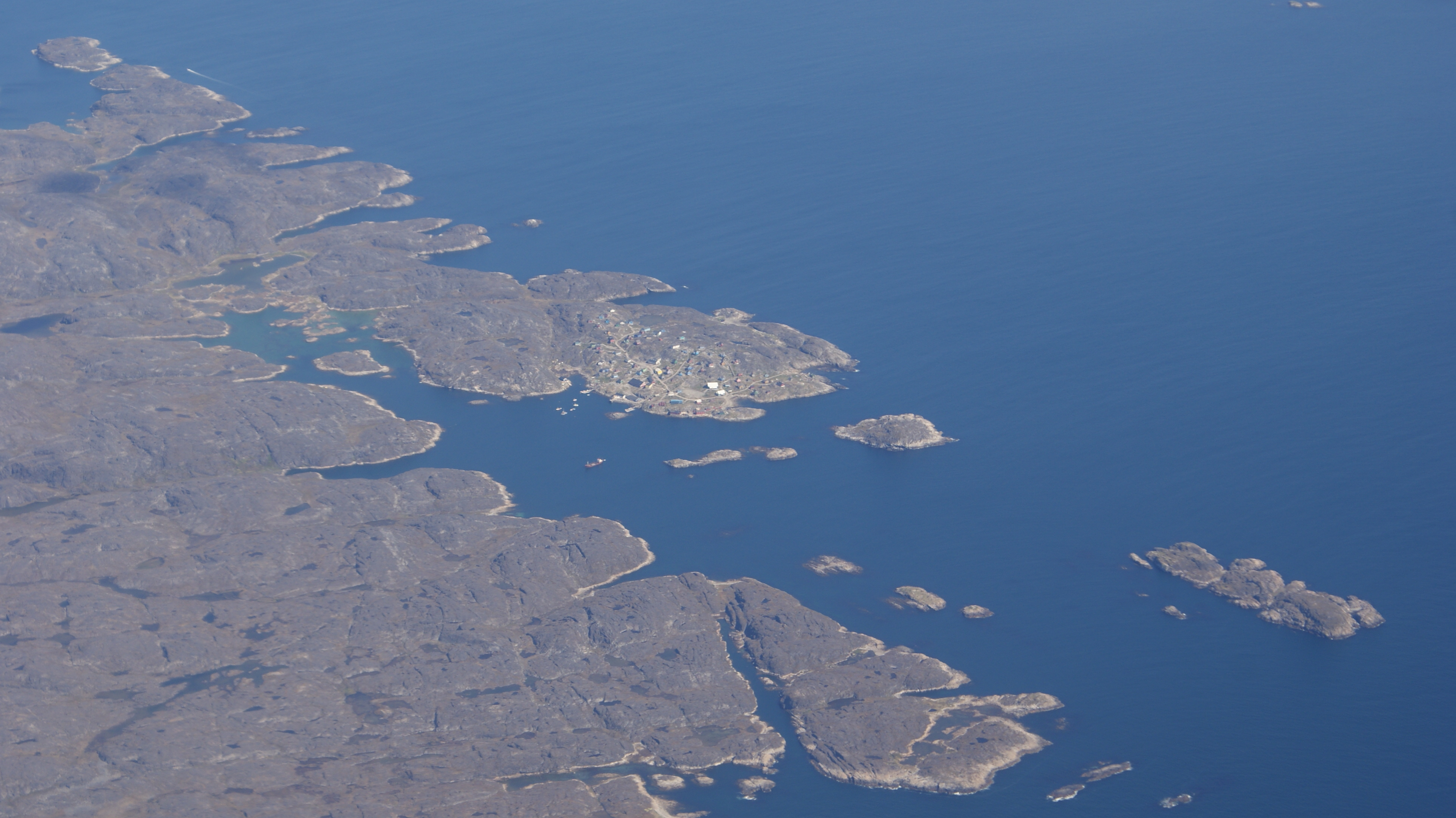
- Aerial view of Atammik

- Location within Greenland
- Coordinates: 64°48′13″N 52°10′35″W
- State: Kingdom of Denmark
- Constituent country: Greenland
- Municipality: Qeqqata

Population (2025)
  - Total: 184
- Time zone: UTC−02:00 (Western Greenland Time)
  - Summer (DST): UTC−01:00 (Western Greenland Summer Time)
- Postal code: 3912 Maniitsoq

Atammik (old spelling: Atangmik) is a settlement in the Qeqqata municipality in central-western Greenland. Located on the shores of Davis Strait, it had 196 inhabitants in 2020. It is the southernmost settlement in the municipality. The local Royal Greenland fish processing factory was closed in July 2010.

== Population ==
The population of Atammik has remained relatively stable over the last two decades, decreasing in the last several years.

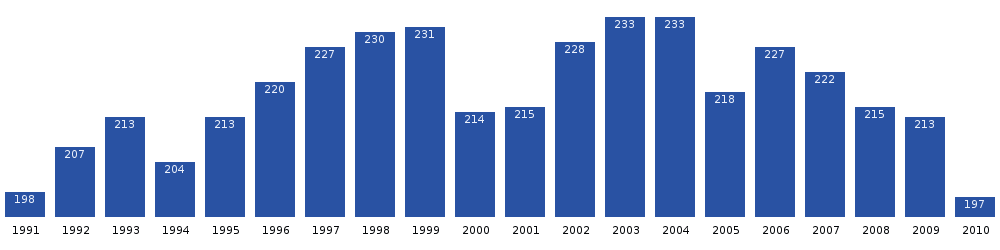
Atammik population growth dynamics in the last two decades. Source: Statistics Greenland
