= Itilleq =

Settlement in Greenland

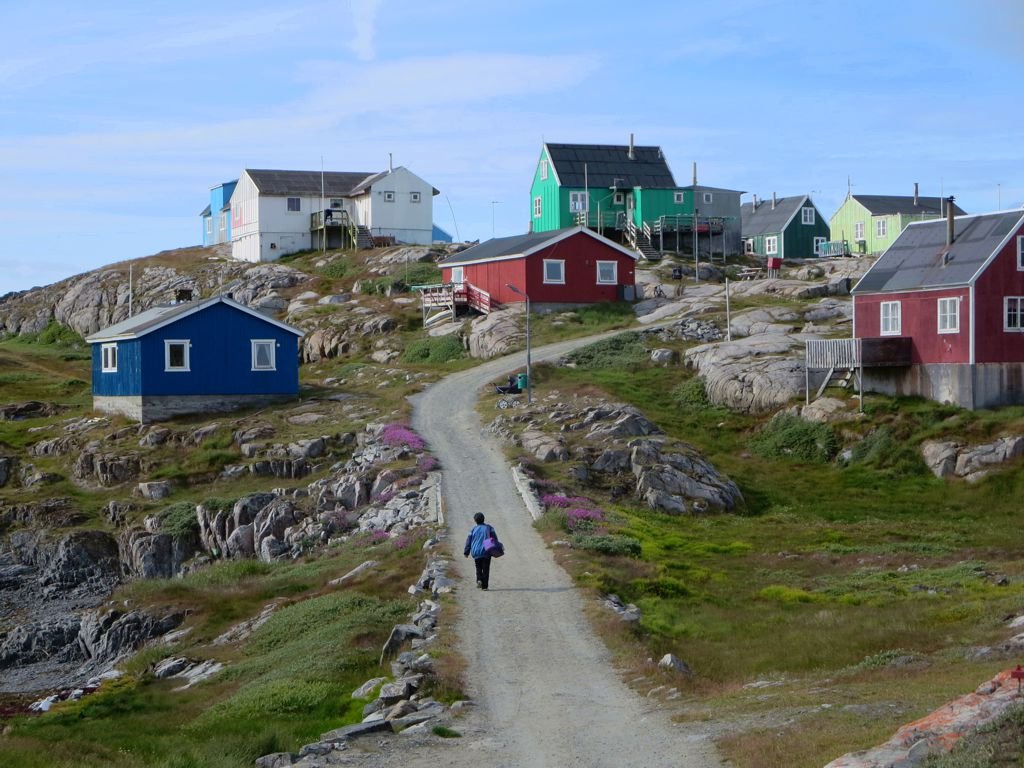
- Udstedholm (Itilleq) in April 2016

- Location within Greenland
- Coordinates: 66°34′40″N 53°30′00″W
- State: Kingdom of Denmark
- Constituent country: Greenland
- Municipality: Qeqqata
- Founded: 1847

Government
  - Mayor: Tukannguaq Dahl

Population (2020)
  - Total: 89
- Time zone: UTC−02:00 (Western Greenland Time)
  - Summer (DST): UTC−01:00 (Western Greenland Summer Time)
- Postal code: 3911 Sisimiut

Itilleq is a settlement in the Qeqqata municipality in central-western Greenland. It is located on a small island around 1 km from the mainland, 45 km south of Sisimiut and 2 km north of the Arctic Circle on the shores of Davis Strait. It had 89 inhabitants in 2020.

== History ==
Itilleq was founded in 1847 on another island, but was later moved 1 kilometer east to its present location.

== Economy ==
The main trade in the settlement is fishing and hunting, with a fish factory being the principal employer. The island has no freshwater, and Itilleq uses a facility for making freshwater from seawater. The village is served by the communal all-purpose Pilersuisoq store.

== Transport ==
There is no road connection to any other settlement, as for most settlements in Greenland.

=== Air ===
The closest aerodrome is Sisimiut Airport in Sisimiut, with connections to Ilulissat, Kangerlussuaq, Maniitsoq, and Nuuk operated by Air Greenland. There are no regular helicopter services to coastal settlements of Davis Strait in the Qeqqata and Sermersooq municipalities. But Itilleq has a helipad (20m, gravel) referenced also in the AIP (BGIQ), so there is on-demand air service possible.

=== Sea ===
Royal Arctic Line provides weekly ferry services to Sarfannguit and Sisimiut, a port of call for the Arctic Umiaq Line, with connections to Ilulissat and Aasiaat in the Disko Bay region, and to coastal towns in southwestern and southern Greenland.

== Population ==
The population of Itilleq has been stable in the last two decades.

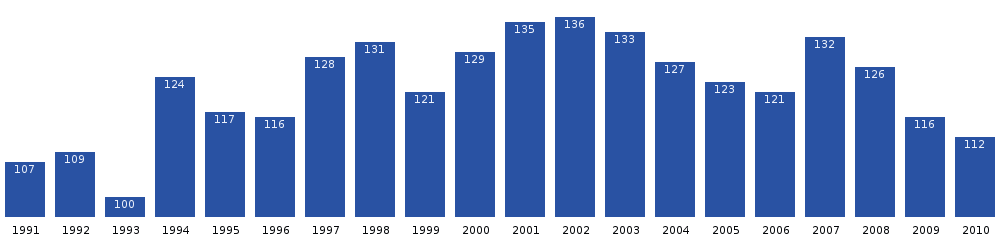
Itilleq population growth dynamics in the last two decades. Source: Statistics Greenland

== Notable residents ==
- Hans Enoksen, prime minister of Greenland from 2002 to 2009
