= Sisimiut Airport =

Airport in Greenland

Sisimiut Airport Mittarfik Sisimiut
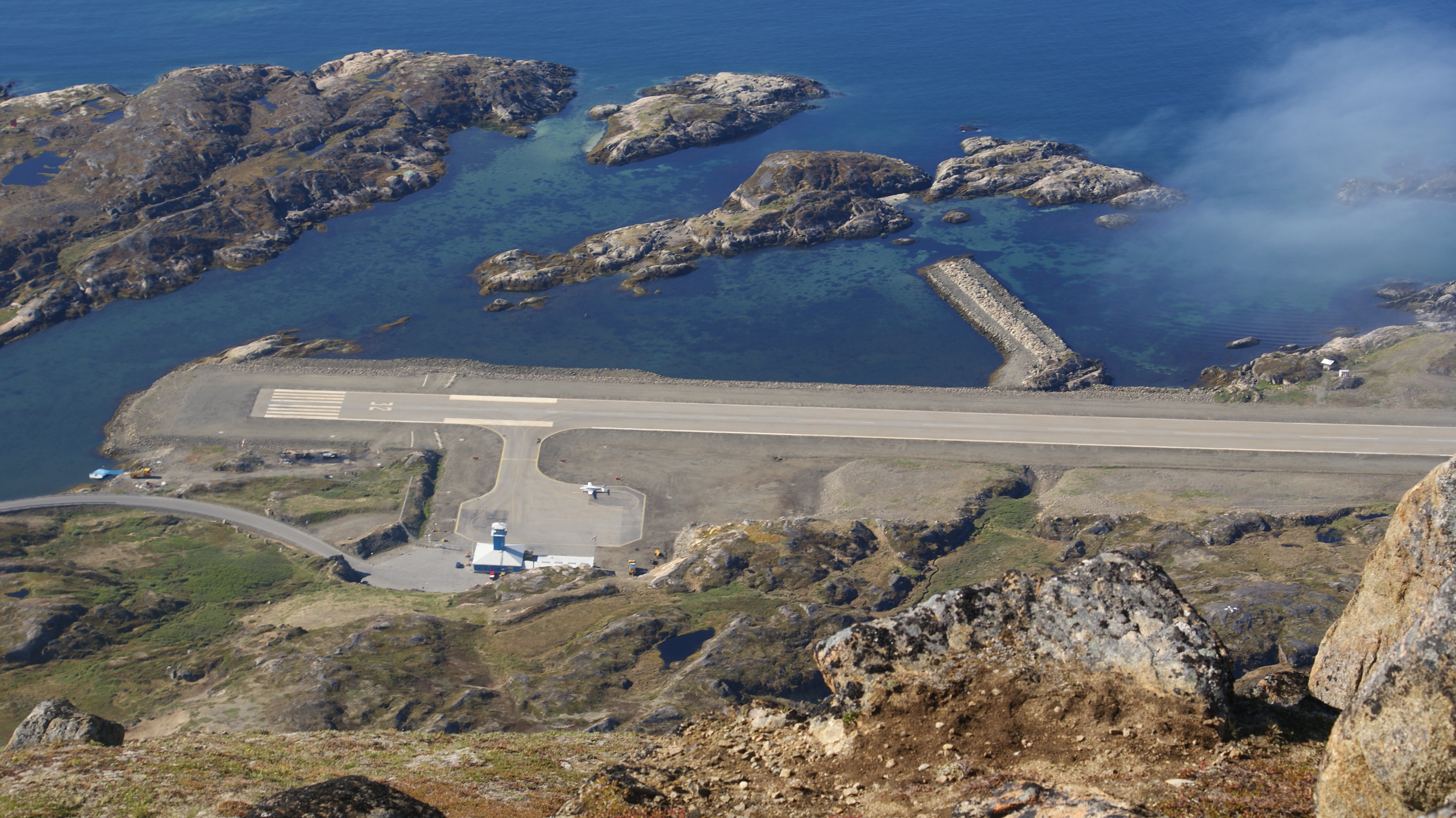
- IATA: JHS; ICAO: BGSS

Summary
- Airport type: Public
- Operator: Greenland Airport Authority (Mittarfeqarfiit)
- Serves: Sisimiut, Greenland
- Opened: 3 October 1998
- Elevation AMSL: 33 ft (10 m)
- Coordinates: 66°57′05″N 053°43′46″W
- Website: Sisimiut Airport

Map
- Location in Greenland

Runways
Direction	Length		Surface
Direction	m	ft	Surface
13/31	799	2,621	Asphalt

Statistics (2012)
- Passengers: 22,955
- Source: Danish AIS Greenland

Sisimiut Airport (Greenlandic: Mittarfik Sisimiut; IATA: JHS, ICAO: BGSS) is an airport located 2.2 NM (4.1 km; 2.5 mi) northwest of Sisimiut, a town in the Qeqqata municipality in central-western Greenland. The airport has a single runway designated 13/31 which measures 799 by 30 m (2,621 by 98 ft), built on the northern shore of Kangerluarsunnguaq Bay.

For scheduled flights, the airport is served exclusively by Air Greenland, serving as a fly-through destination with no aircraft stationed onsite. Operated by Greenland Airports, it is also used for general aviation purposes.

== Airlines and destinations ==
Airlines	Destinations
Air Greenland	Ilulissat, Kangerlussuaq, Nuuk

Roads in Sisimiut, including the road to the airport, are surfaced, but there is no road linking Sisimiut to any other settlement.

With 5,460 inhabitants in 2010, Sisimiut is the second-largest town in Greenland, one of the few towns in the country exhibiting growth patterns, with corresponding increasing passenger traffic at Sisimiut Airport. Air Greenland pledges to maintain a relatively high number of flights at the airport even should the construction of the road to Kangerlussuaq commence.

== History ==
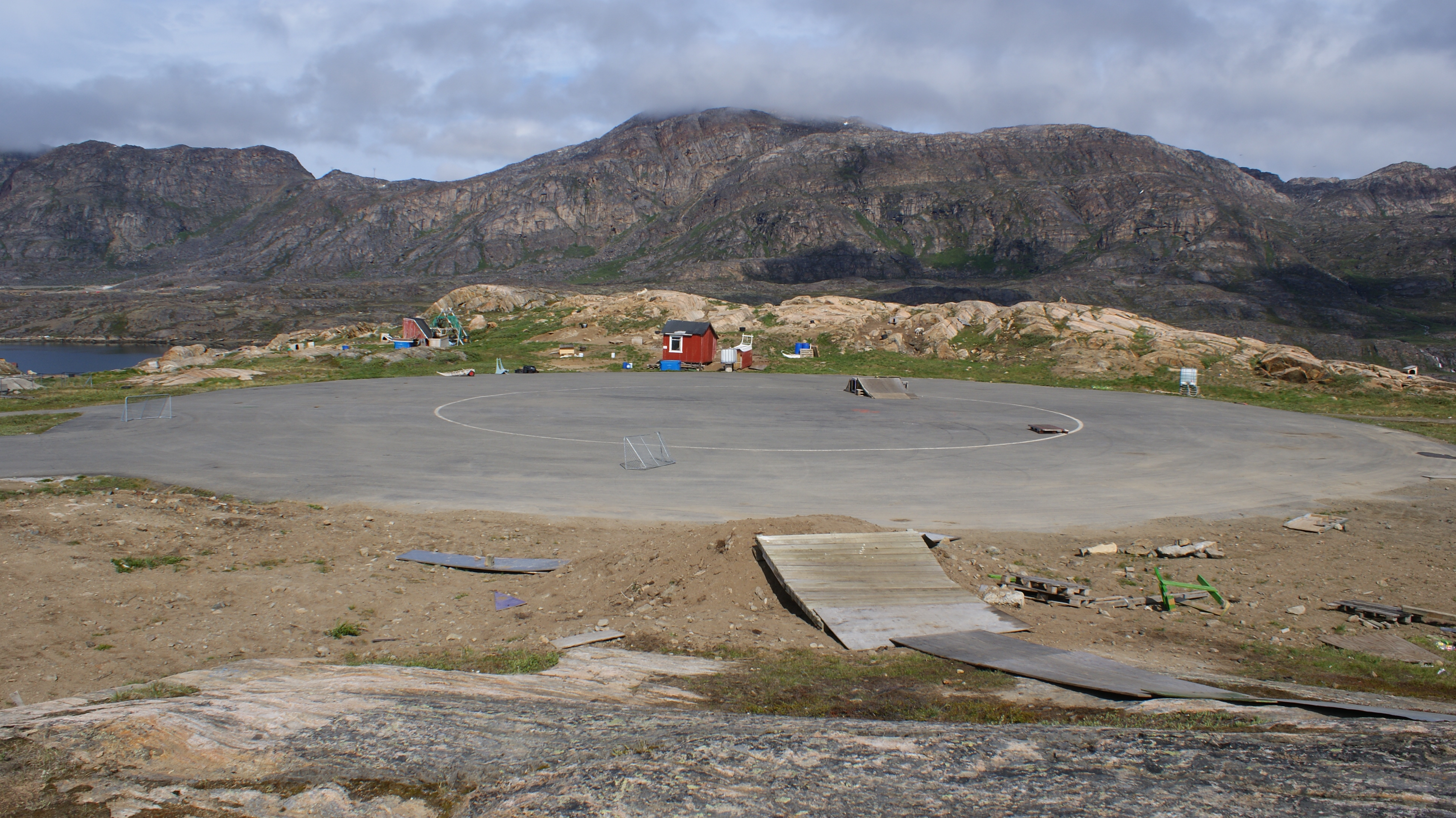
The helipad at the old, now closed heliport east of Sisimiut.

Sisimiut Airport is one of a series of airports built in several Greenlandic cities starting in 1995. Construction of the road to the airport began in February 1996 and included a bridge over the harbour in the town, which was completed in July 1997. The airport was partially built into the sea by landfill. The airport opened on 3 October 1998. Construction costs were 210 million kroner, making it the most expensive airport in the country at the time.

Before the airport was opened, Sisimiut had been served by the now-closed heliport, located on the eastern outskirts of the town, in Sisimiut valley (at 66.939314°N 53.632251°W).

The construction of Sisimiut Airport was part of the regional airport network extension in Greenland, with several airports built to serve STOL aircraft of Air Greenland − the venerable De Havilland Canada Dash-7s acquired in the preceding decade − planes particularly suited to the often severe weather conditions in Greenland. The other new additions were Maniitsoq Airport in the southern part of the Qeqqata municipality, Aasiaat Airport in western Greenland; Qaarsut Airport and Upernavik Airport in northwestern Greenland.

Since 2000, construction of a 170 km (110 mi) road to Kangerlussuaq has been discussed. The road would be the first of its kind in Greenland, connecting two settlements, and reducing the need for passenger exchange at Kangerlussuaq Airport, the airline hub and the need for the Sisimiut Airport. It would link the then national hub with a ship port, allowing goods to be transported by road and ship from Kangerlussuaq. In 2016 there was a decision by the municipality to build a very simple track for 4x4 vehicles between Sisimiut and Kangerlussuaq. This track was finished in 2025. In the mean time Nuuk Airport was rebuilt into a large airport, opened 2024, reducing the need of the Kangerlussuaq airport.

== Future ==
In the short term, there are plans to extend the runway a little, in connection with the replacement of the Air Greenland fleet.

== Facilities ==
There is no deicing equipment at the airport, which is costly and problematic in Greenlandic winter. All passengers connecting through the airport and continuing with the same plane to another destination are required to disembark and undergo regular boarding process checks before they can re-board and continue the flight.

At the terminal there is a Post Greenland box, a soft drink machine and television, and a small exhibition from the Sisimiut Museum. A workstation in kiosk mode provides tourist, municipal and airport related information. Taxis are available at the airport.
