= Qeqqata =

Municipality of Greenland

Qeqqata Centrum (Danish)
- Municipality
- Qeqqata Municipality; Qeqqata Kommunia (Greenlandic); Qeqqata Kommune (Danish)
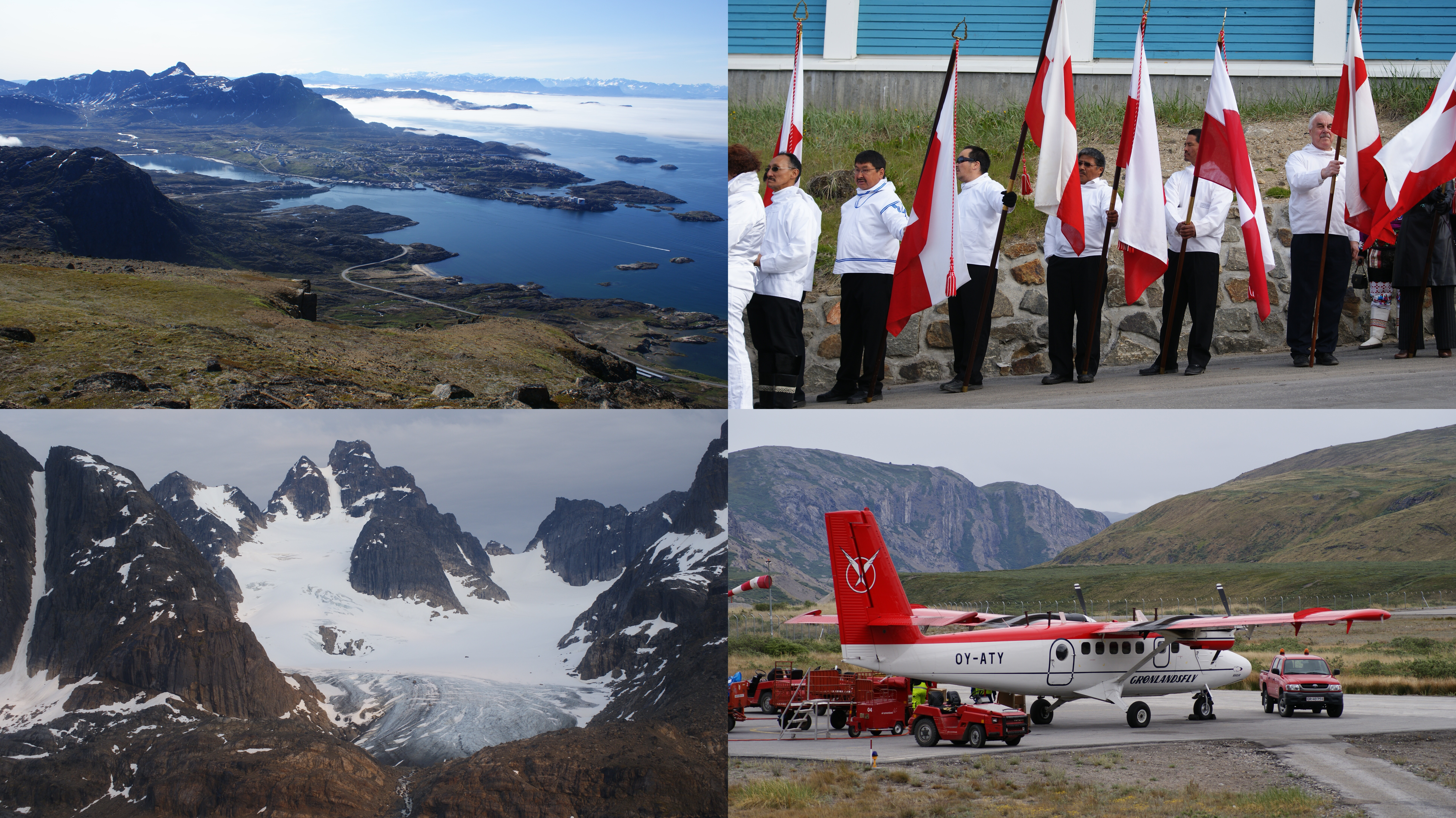
- Clockwise from top left: Davis Strait, Sisimiut, Kangerlussuaq Airport, Sermersut Island

- Flag Coat of arms

- Location of the Qeqqata municipality within Greenland
- Coordinates (Qeqqata Commune): 66°30′N 48°00′W
- Sovereign state: Kingdom of Denmark
- Autonomous territory: Greenland
- Established: 1 January 2009
- Municipal center: Sisimiut

Government
  - Mayor: Malik Berthelsen (Siumut)

Area
  - Total: 115,500 km^{2} (44,600 sq mi)

Population (1 January 2025)
  - Total: 9,179
  - Density: 0.07947/km^{2} (0.2058/sq mi)
- Time zone: UTC-02, UTC-01
- Calling code: +299
- ISO 3166 code: GL-QE
- Website: qeqqata.gl

Qeqqata (Greenlandic pronunciation: [qɜqːata], Danish: Centrum, lit. 'Centre') is a municipality in western Greenland, operational from 1 January 2009. The municipality was named after its location in the central-western part of the country. Its population is 9,179 as of January 2025. The administrative center of the municipality is in Sisimiut (formerly called Holsteinsborg).

== Creation ==
It consists of the previously unincorporated area of Kangerlussuaq and two former municipalities of western Greenland, Maniitsoq and Sisimiut.

== Geography ==
In the south and east, the municipality is flanked by the Sermersooq municipality; however, settlements and associated trade are concentrated mainly alongside the coast. In the north, it is bordered by the Qeqertalik municipality. The waters of the western coast are that of the Davis Strait, separating Greenland from Baffin Island. With an area of 115,500 km^{2} (44,594.8 mi^{2}), it is the third-smallest municipality of Greenland.

== Politics ==
Qeqqata's municipal council consists of 15 members, elected every four years.

=== Municipal council ===
Election	Party					Total seats	Turnout	Elected mayor
Election	A	D	IA	N	S	Total seats	Turnout	Elected mayor
2008	3	1	4		7	15	59.7%	
2013	4		2		9	15	57.6%	Hermann Berthelsen (S)
2017	3		3	1	8	15	61.1%	Malik Berthelsen (S)^{b.}
2021	2		3	4	6	15	63.8%	Malik Berthelsen (S)^{b.}
2025	1	2^{a.}	2^{a.}	4	6	15	55.9%	Malik Berthelsen (S)^{b.}
Data from Valg.gl

^{a. Despite the Democrats (D) winning a greater share of the vote than Inuit Ataqatigiit (IA) (with the former supposedly awarded 3 seats and the latter only 1 seat), only 2 candidates from (D) actually ran for local council in the respective municipality. Therefore, to ensure proportionality in the council, IA was awarded the second seat instead.}
^{b.2025: S-IA coalition}

== Administrative divisions ==
=== Maniitsoq area ===
- Maniitsoq (Sukkertoppen)
- Atammik
- Kangaamiut (Gammel Sukkertoppen)
- Napasoq

=== Sisimiut area ===
- Sisimiut (Holsteinsborg)
- Itilleq
- Kangerlussuaq (Søndre Strømfjord)
- Sarfannguit

== Transport ==
Like all of Greenland, there are no roads between settlements. There are three airports in Qeqqata, Kangerlussuaq, Maniitsoq and Sisimiut, where Kangerlussuaq is the international hub for Greenland. Other settlements are served by boats.

A simple road for terrain vehicles exists between Kangerlussuaq and Sisimiut and was built in 2020-2021.

== See also ==
- KANUKOKA
