= List of islands of Greenland =

Geography of Greenland

The following is an alphabetical list of the islands of Greenland. Many of these islands have both a Kalaallisut language name and a European language name.

== Islands and archipelagoes ==
- Aaluik
- Aasiaat
- Achton Friis Islands
- Aggas
- Akilia
- Alluttoq Island
- Aluk Island
- Ammassalik Island
- Appat Island
- Apusiaajik Island
- ATOW1996
- Beaumont Island
- Bjorne Island
- Bjorne Islands
- Bonsall Islands
- Bontekoe Island
- Borup Island (West Jensen Island)
- Brainard Island
- Bushnan Island
- Cape Farewell Archipelago
  - Annikitsoq
  - Anoraliuirsoq
  - Avallersuaq
  - Egger Island
  - Ikeq Island
  - Nunarsuaq (Nunarssuak)
  - Pamialluk
  - Qernertoq
  - Sammisoq
  - Saningassoq
  - Walkendorff Island
- Carey Islands
- Castle Island, Greenland
- Clavering Island
- Crown Prince Islands
- Crozier Island
- Danmark Island
- Danske Islands
- Deception Island (Greenland)
- Diego's Island
- Djævleøen
- Dog's Island
- Edward Island
- Elison Island
- Ella Island
- Ensomheden
- Finsch Islands
- Franklin Island
- Franske Islands
- Gamma Island (Bjornesk Island)
- Geographical Society Island
- George Island
- Godfred Hansen Island
- Graah Archipelago
  - Dannebrog Island
  - Ittit
  - Simîtakajâ
- Greenland
- Griffenfeld Island
- Hakluyt Island
- Hannah Island
- Hanne Island
- Hans Island
- Hareoen Island
- Harvard Islands
- Hazenland
- Hendrik Island
- Henrik Krøyer Holme
- Hornemann Island
- Hovgaard Island
- Igdluluarssuk
- Ikerasak Island
- Illorsuit Island (Ubekendt Ejland)
- Iluileq
- Île-de-France (Greenland)
- Imaarsivik
- Immikkoortukajik
- Inge Island
- Ingjald Island
- Inner Kitsissut
- Inussullissuaq Island
- Ivingmiut
- Jackson Island
- Joe Island (Greenland)
- John Murray Island
- Josephine Peary Island
- Kaffeklubben Island
- Kanajoorartuut
- Kiatak (Northumberland Island)
- Kiatassuaq
- Kitak
- Kitsissut Islands
- Kook Islands
- Kronprinsen Ejland
- Kuhn Island
- Kulusuk Island
- Lindhards Island
- Little Pendulum Island
- Littleton Island
- Lockwood Island
- Luigi Amadeo Island
- Lynn Island
- McGary Islands
- MacMillan Island
- Maniitsoq Island
- Maria Island (Greenland)
- Melville Monument (Greenland)
- Meteorite Island
- Milne Land
- Nanortalik Island
- Nanuuseq
- Nares Land
- Norske Islands
- Offley Island
- Ole Romer Island
- Oodaaq
- Otto Rud Islands
- Outer Kitsissut
- Permin Land
- Princess Dagmar Island
- Princess Margaret Island
- Princess Thyra Island
- Qajartalik
- Qassimiut Islands
- Qeertartivaq
- Qeertartivatsiaq
- Qeqertaq
- Qeqertaq Avannarleq
- Qeqertarssdaq
- Qeqertarsuaq Island (Nuuk)
- Qeqertarsuaq (Disko Island)
- Qeqertarsuaq (Herbert Island)
- Qeqertarsuatsiaq Island
- Qianarreq
- Qiianarteq
- Qoornuup Qeqertarsua
- Queen Louise Island
- Qutdleq
- Raffles Island
- Romer Island (Rømer Ø)
- Ruth Island
- Sabine Island
- Salleq Island
- Salliaruseq Island (Storøen)
- Salve Island
- Sattiaatteq
- Saunders Island, Greenland
- Schnauder Island
- Sermersooq Island
- Sermersut Island
- Sermitsiaq Island
- Shannon Island
- Simiutaq Island (West coast)
- Simiutaq Island (SW coast)
- Skal Island (Skalø)
- Skjoldungen
- Soren Norby Islands
- Stephenson Island (Greenland)
- Steward Island
- Store Koldewey
- Storo (Greenland)
- Sutherland Island
- Suunikajik
- Sverdrup Island (Greenland)
- Talerua Island
- Takiseeq
- Timmiarmiit
- Tobias Island
- Traill Island
- Trefoldigheden
- Turner Island
- Uiivaq
- Ujuaakajiip Nunaa
- Upepnagssivik
- Upernivik Island
- Upernattivik
- Uttorsiutit
- Uummannaq Island
- Uummannaarsuk
- Uunartoq Island
- Uunartoq Qeqertaq
- Valkyrie Islands
- Wolstenholme Island
- Ymer Island
- 83-42

=== Upernavik Archipelago ===
Aappilattoq (Upernavik Icefjord) • Aappilattoq (Tasiusaq Bay) • Akia • Akuliaruseq • Amarortalik • Amitsorsuaq • Anarusuk • Apparsuit • Atilissuaq • Aukarnersuaq • Ateqanngitsorsuaq • Horse Head • Ikerasakassak • Ikermoissuaq • Ikermiut • Illunnguit • Innaarsuit • Inussullissuaq • Iperaq • Itissaalik • Kangaarsuk • Karrat • Kiatassuaq • Kiataussaq • Kingittorsuaq • Kullorsuaq • Maniitsoq • Mattaangassut • Mernoq • Naajaat • Nako • Nasaussaq • Nuluuk • Nunaa • Nunatarsuaq • Nutaarmiut • Nutaarmiut (Tasiusaq Bay) • Nuuluk • Paagussat • Paornivik • Puugutaa • Qaarsorsuaq • Qaarsorsuatsiaq • Qallunaat • Qaneq • Qaqaarissorsuaq • Qasse • Qeqertaq • Qeqertarsuaq • Qullikorsuit • Saarlia • Saattoq • Saattorsuaq • Saattup Akia • Sanningassoq • Saqqarlersuaq • Singarnaq-Annertussoq • Sisuarsuit • Sugar Loaf • Taartoq • Tasiusaq • Timilersua • Tukingassoq • Tussaaq • Tuttorqortooq • Uigorlersuaq • Uilortussoq • Upernavik

== Mythical or phantom islands ==
- Buss Island
- Fata Morgana Land
- Groclant
- Thule

== See also ==
- Greenland
  - Geography of Greenland
  - List of Greenland-related topics
- List of islands by area
- List of islands by highest point
- List of islands by population
- List of islands in lakes
