= Qeqertarsuaq (disambiguation) =

Qeqertarsuaq may refer to:

- Qeqertarsuaq, town on Disko Island, Greenland

== Islands ==
- Qeqertarsuaq or Storø, an island located near Nuuk.
- Disko Island, in Greenlandic Qeqertarsuaq, located in Disko Bay.
- Qeqertarsuaq, 71°34′N 53°10′W, an island in Karrat Fjord near Upernivik Island.
- Qeqertarsuaq or Herbert Island, an island located in far northwestern Greenland.
- Qeqertarsuaq in SE Greenland
- In the Upernavik Archipelago:
  - Qeqertarsuaq (Upernavik), also known as Qeqertaq
  - Qeqertarsuaq Island (Upernavik Icefjord)
  - Qeqertarsuaq Island (Nasaussap Saqqaa)
  - Qeqertarsuaq Island (Kangerlussuaq Icefjord)
