= Upernavik Icefjord =

Fjord in Greenland

Coordinates: 72°55′N 55°25′W

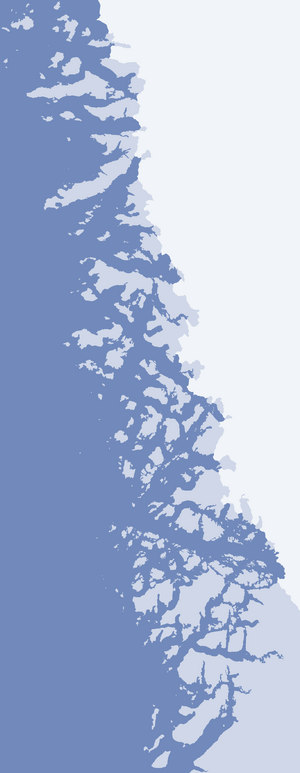
Upernavik Icefjord (Upernavik Archipelago)

Upernavik Icefjord (also: Ikeq, Aappilattup Ikera, Danish: Upernavik Isfjord) is a fjord in Avannaata municipality in northwestern Greenland.

== Geography ==
The 70 km (43 mi) long fjord flows to the northwest between two chains of islands, emptying into Baffin Bay. The head of the fjord is located at the mainland of Greenland, at the front of Upernavik Glacier.

In the northeast, a chain of larger islands flank the fjord, from east to west: Maniitsoq Island, Puugutaa Island, Sisuarissut Island, Qaneq Island, and Tussaaq Island.

The chain of islands bounding the fjord from the southwest consists of mostly small islands and skerries. The major islands are, from east to west: Uilortussoq Island, Qeqertarsuaq Island, and Aappilattoq Island. Further to the northwest of Aappilattoq, the islands become progressively smaller.
