= Ikerasakassak Strait =

Strait of Greenland

Ikerasakassak Strait is a strait of Greenland. It is located in the Upernavik Archipelago.
