= Ateqanngitsorsuaq Island =

Island in Greenland

Ateqanngitsorsuaq
- Location within Greenland

Geography
- Location: Greenland
- Coordinates: 73°13′30″N 55°52′00″W
- Archipelago: Upernavik Archipelago

Administration
- Greenland
- Municipality: Avannaata

Ateqanngitsorsuaq Island (old spelling: Ateqángitsorssuaq) is an uninhabited island in Avannaata municipality in northwestern Greenland.

== Geography ==
Ateqanngitsorsuaq Island is located in the outer belt of islands in Tasiusaq Bay, in the south-central part of Upernavik Archipelago. In the south, it is separated from sibling Innaarsuit Island by a very narrow channel. Unlike the latter, it is mountainous, with the highest point reaching 516 m (1,693 ft) in an unnamed summit in the center of the island.

The inner waterways of Tasiusaq Bay separate it from Qaqaarissorsuaq Island in the northeast. Several skerries buffer the eastern coast of the island.

== See also ==
- List of islands of Greenland
