= Kullorsuaq =

Settlement in Greenland

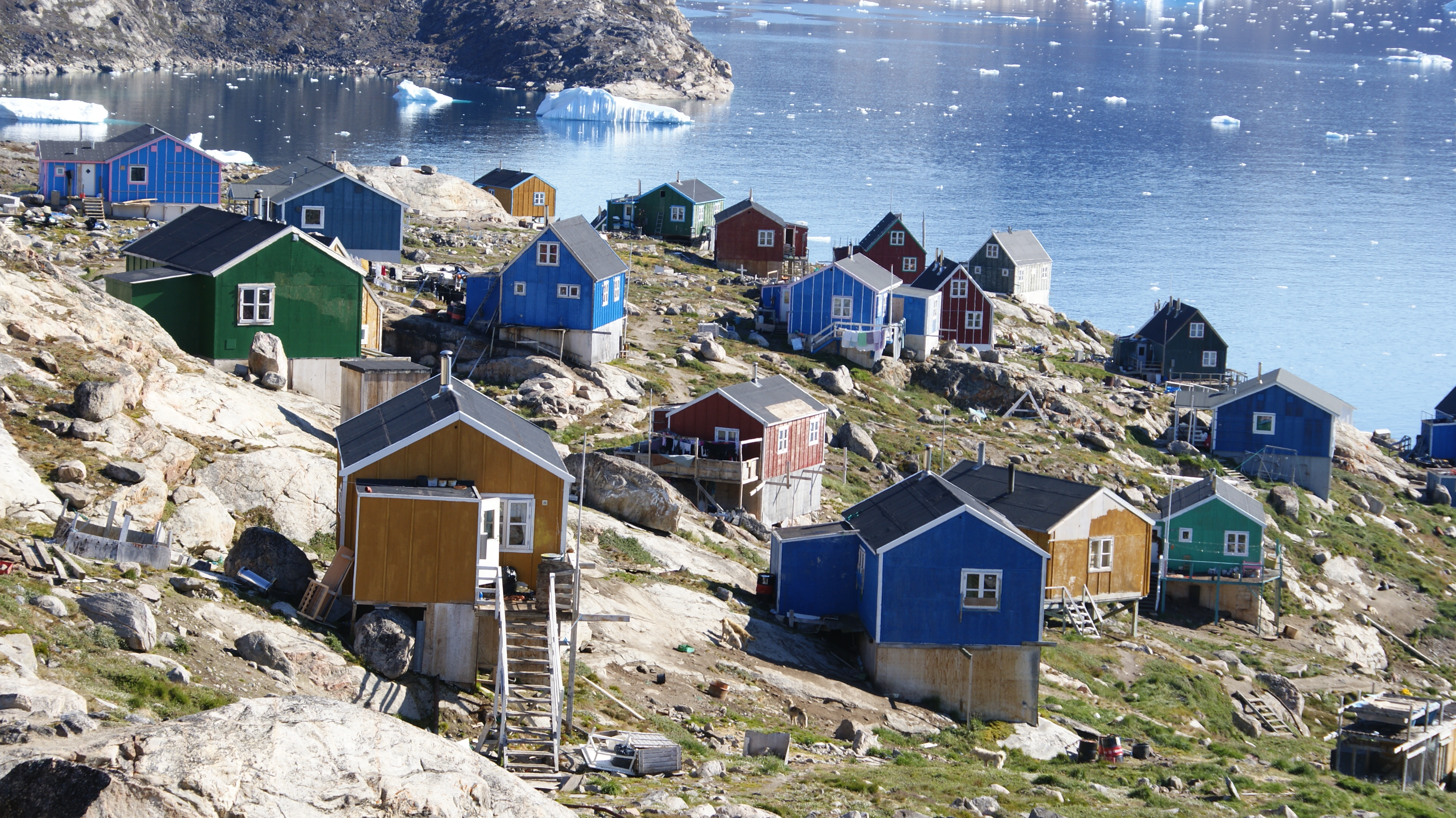
- Wooden houses in Kullorsuaq

- Location within Greenland
- Coordinates: 74°34′45″N 57°13′05″W
- State: Kingdom of Denmark
- Constituent country: Greenland
- Municipality: Avannaata
- Founded: 1928

Population (2025)
  - Total: 441
- Time zone: UTC−02:00 (Western Greenland Time)
  - Summer (DST): UTC−01:00 (Western Greenland Summer Time)
- Postal code: 3962 Upernavik

Kullorsuaq is a settlement in the Avannaata municipality in northwestern Greenland. It is the northernmost settlement in the Upernavik Archipelago, located on Kullorsuaq Island at the southern end of Melville Bay, itself part of the larger Baffin Bay.

The settlement was founded in 1928 and became a trading station, growing in size after World War II when hunters from several small villages around Inussulik Bay, Sugar Loaf Bay, and Tasiusaq Bay moved into the larger settlements such as Nuussuaq and Kullorsuaq. Today, Kullorsuaq remains one of the most traditional hunting and fishing villages in Greenland and maintains a stable population.

The name of the settlement means "Big Thumb" in Kalaallisut, after the Devil's Thumb, a prominent pinnacle-shaped mountain in the center of the island about 3 km (1.9 mi) north of the settlement.

== Geography ==
Kullorsuaq is located on an island of the same name at the southern end of Melville Bay. The island is the northernmost part of Upernavik Archipelago.

== History ==
=== Prehistory ===
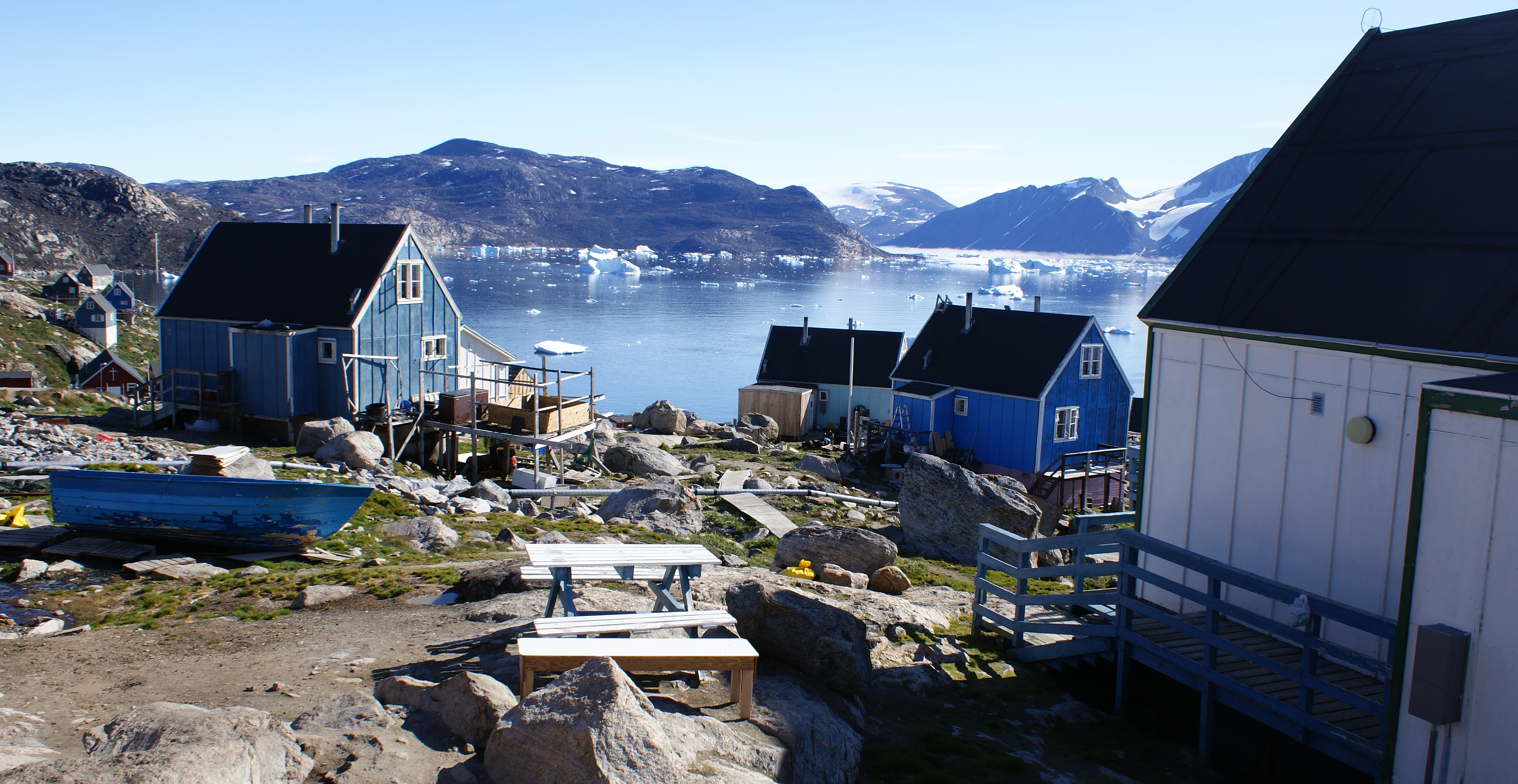
Kullorsuaq

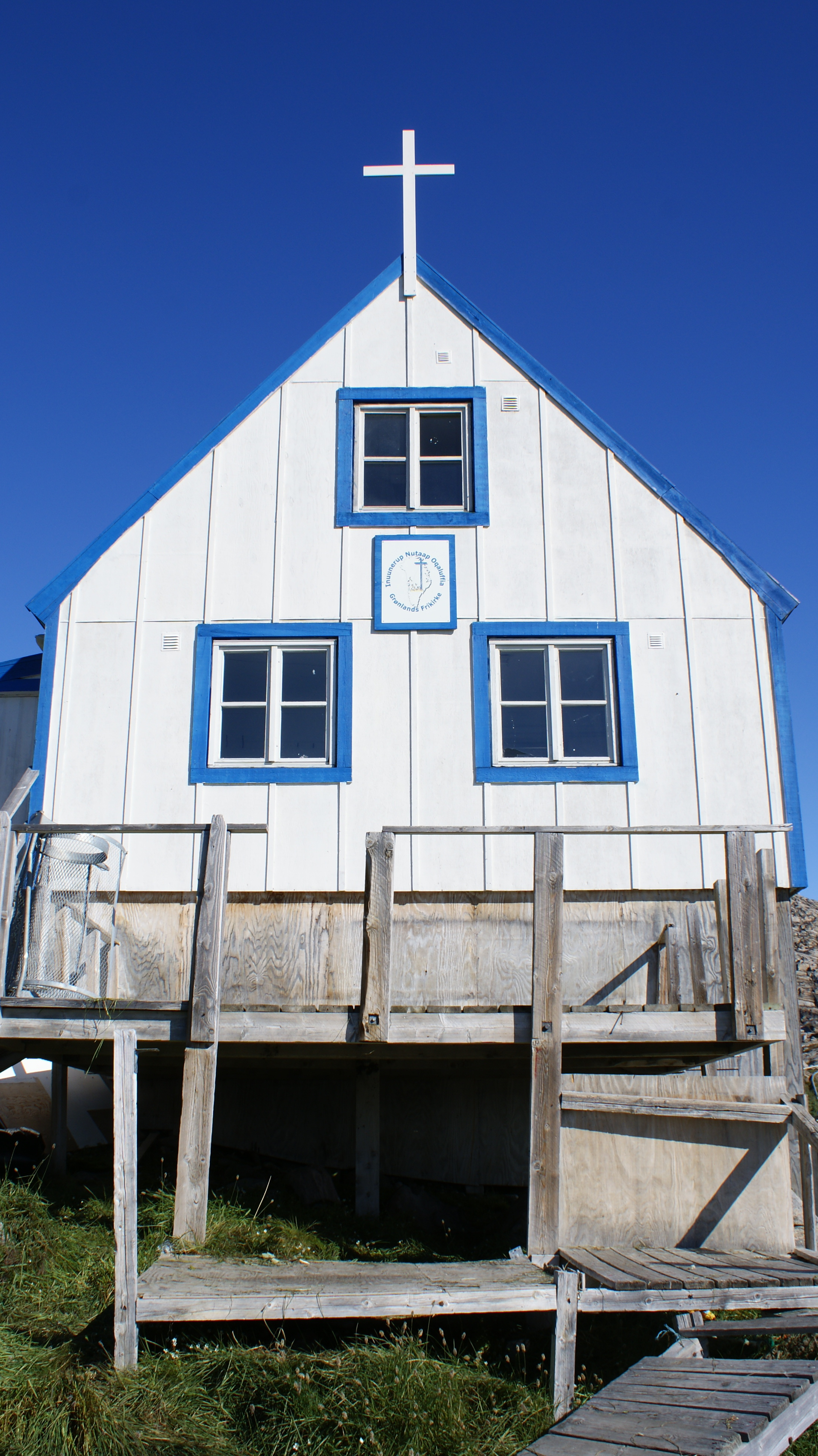
Inuunerup Nutaap Oqaluffia, the Greenland Free Church in Kullorsuaq

The Upernavik Archipelago was among the earliest-settled areas of Greenland, the first migrants arriving approximately 4,000 years ago. All southbound migrations of the Inuit passed through the area, leaving behind a trail of archaeological sites. These first settlers belong to the Saqqaq culture but were followed around 3,000 years ago by the Dorset culture, which spread along the coast of Baffin Bay. In the 13th and 14th centuries, the Dorset were themselves displaced by the Thule people.

The archipelago has been continuously – but sparsely – inhabited over this period. Migrants in the 19th and early 20th centuries found many ruins of Inuit settlement on Kullorsuaq, Kiatassuaq, and other smaller islands around Melville Bay, although Danish settlers during the colonial era were unaware of Kullorsuaq until the end of 19th century.

=== 20th century ===
The modern settlement was initially populated by hunters from now-abandoned villages to Kiatassuaq's south: Inussulik Bay, Sugar Loaf Bay, and Tasiusaq Bay. The initial wave of settlers originated in villages of fewer than 10 people: Ikermiut (abandoned 1954), Itissaalik (abandoned 1957), and Kuuk (abandoned 1972). Several families of hunters from Nuussuaq also moved north to Kullorsuaq, which was founded in 1928.

Between 1930 and 1960, northwestern Greenland underwent a consolidation phase, largely driven by the Danish colonial authorities via Royal Greenland, then part of KNI, which possessed an island-wide monopoly on trade. The mutual agreement between the hunting families and the trade company limited the pre-war northward expansion until the 1950s, when the populations of the smaller settlements reinforced larger communities in Nuussuaq and Kullorsuaq. In 1952, Kullorsuaq became the northernmost trading post in the archipelago with the establishment of its first year-round shop.

In the 1960s, Kullorsuaq was a staging point for further expansion into Savissivik 274 km (170 mi) to the northwest, although this was unsuccessful and most migrants returned south in the 1980s and 1990s. Today, the settlement remains one of the most traditional hunting and fishing villages in Greenland.

The French film “Le voyage au Groenland” (english: Journey to Greenland) directed by Sébastien Betbeder which premiered in 2016 takes place in Kullorsuaq.

== Economy ==
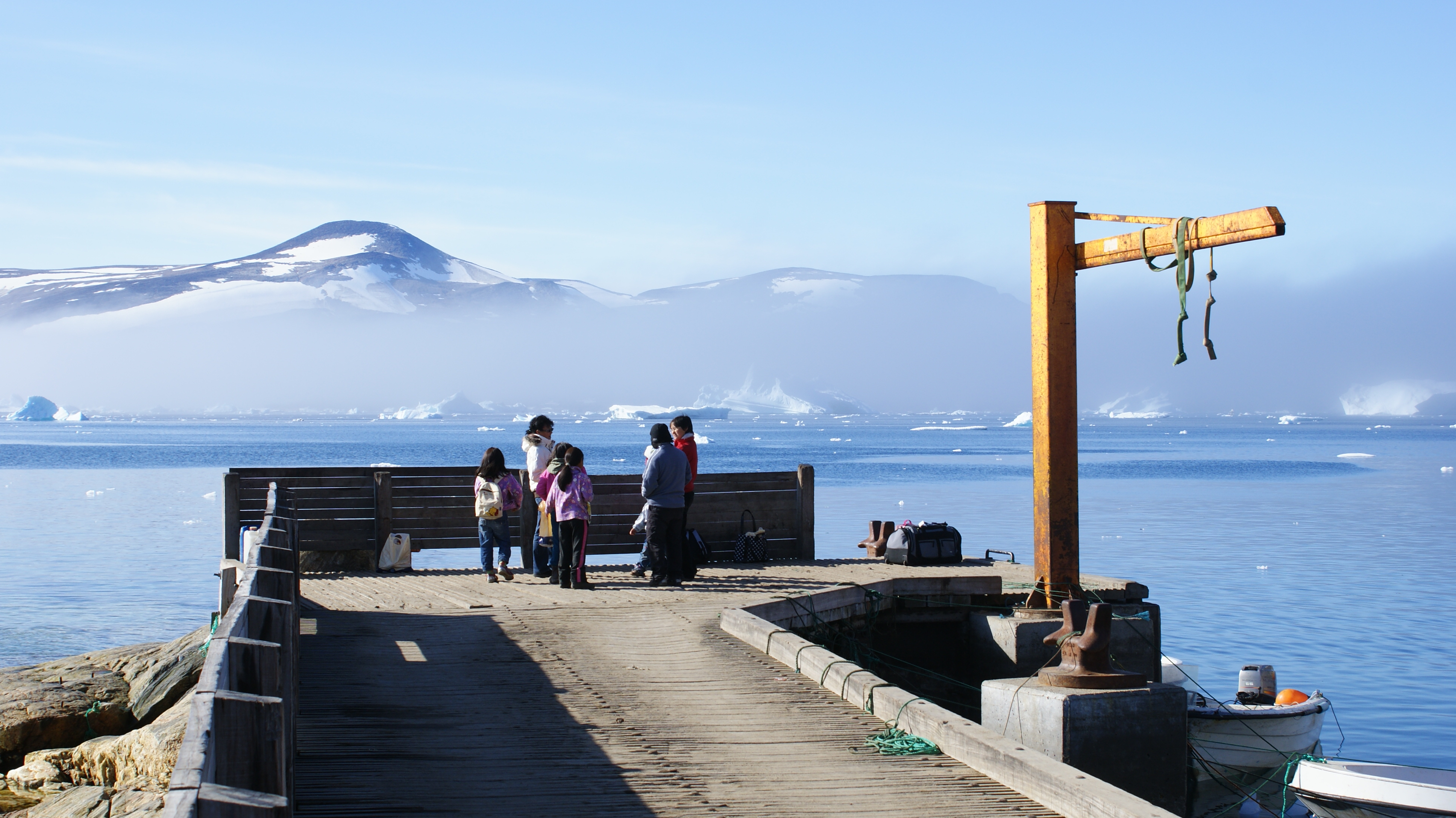
Kullorsuaq Harbour

Fishing – including narwhals and whales – and hunting – including fur seals and walruses – are the primary occupations in the area. The fish processing plant for Upernavik Seafood (a subsidiary of Royal Greenland) and the Pilersuisoq general store are the only organized employers in the settlement.

Kullorsuaq is among the 10 poorest communities in Greenland, as are three other settlements in the archipelago – Naajaat, Nuussuaq, and Upernavik Kujalleq.

== Transport ==
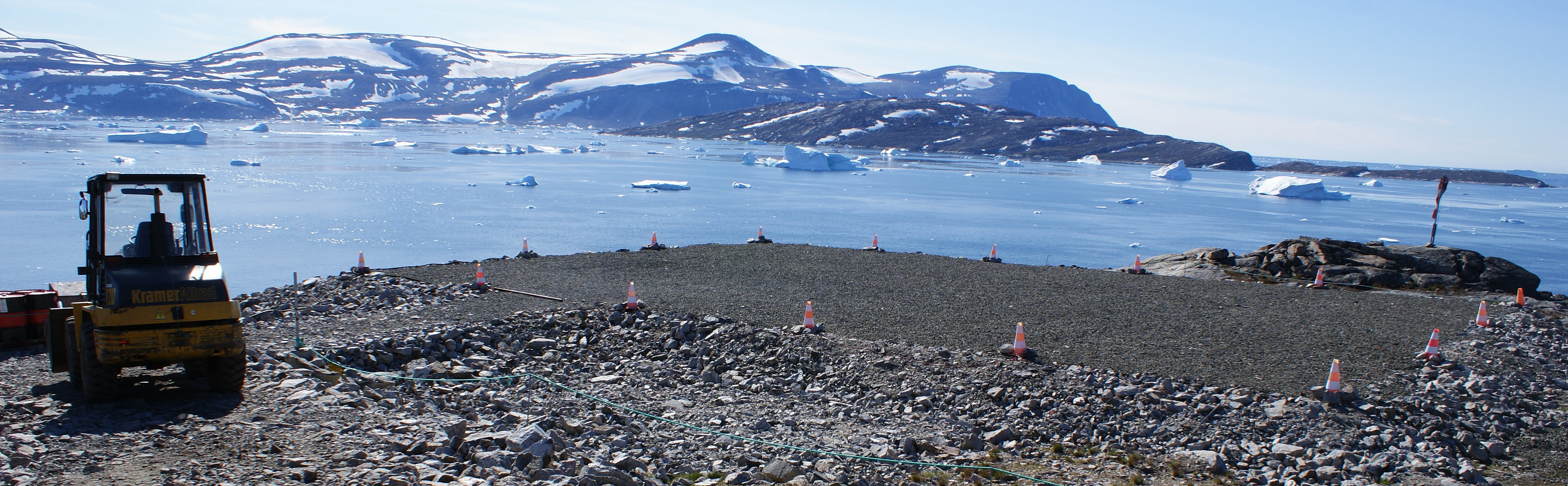
Kullorsuaq Heliport

Air Greenland serves the village as part of a government contract, with twice-weekly helicopter flights to Nuussuaq and Upernavik.

== Population ==
With 453 inhabitants (2020), Kullorsuaq is the largest settlement in the Upernavik Archipelago outside of Upernavik. It is one of the few settlements in the Avannaata municipality exhibiting significant growth patterns over the course of the last two decades, increasing by over 63% relative to its 1990 level and by almost 16% relative to its 2000 level.

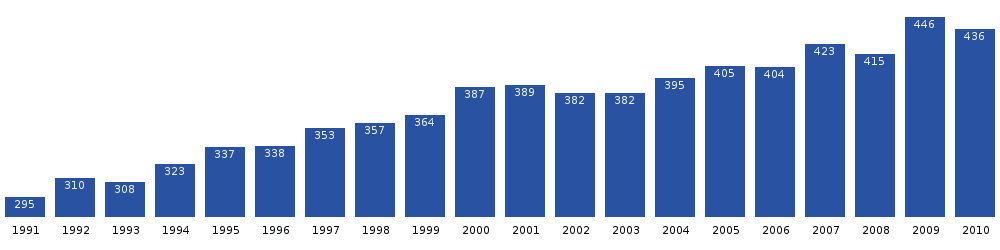
Kullorsuaq population growth dynamics, 1991-2010. Source: Statistics Greenland

== Climate ==
Kullorsuaq has a tundra climate (Köppen climate classification ET) with very cold, long winters and chilly, short summers. Seasonal lag is so strong that August is the warmest month and very similar to July. February is the coldest month, and April is colder than December.

Climate data for Kullorsuaq
Month	Jan	Feb	Mar	Apr	May	Jun	Jul	Aug	Sep	Oct	Nov	Dec	Year
Mean daily maximum °C (°F)	−16.6 (2.1)	−19.3 (−2.7)	−18.9 (−2.0)	−10.8 (12.6)	−2.3 (27.9)	1.6 (34.9)	5.3 (41.5)	5.6 (42.1)	2.4 (36.3)	−1.5 (29.3)	−5.8 (21.6)	−11.3 (11.7)	−6.0 (21.3)
Daily mean °C (°F)	−18.4 (−1.1)	−21.3 (−6.3)	−21.1 (−6.0)	−14 (7)	−4.8 (23.4)	0.5 (32.9)	4.5 (40.1)	4.8 (40.6)	1.3 (34.3)	−2.5 (27.5)	−6.9 (19.6)	−12.7 (9.1)	−7.6 (18.4)
Mean daily minimum °C (°F)	−20.2 (−4.4)	−23.3 (−9.9)	−23.4 (−10.1)	−17.2 (1.0)	−7.2 (19.0)	−0.6 (30.9)	3.6 (38.5)	3.9 (39.0)	0.2 (32.4)	−3.5 (25.7)	−8 (18)	−14.1 (6.6)	−9.1 (15.6)
Average rainfall mm (inches)	7 (0.3)	4 (0.2)	5 (0.2)	8 (0.3)	10 (0.4)	14 (0.6)	20 (0.8)	32 (1.3)	28 (1.1)	36 (1.4)	31 (1.2)	19 (0.7)	214 (8.5)
Average snowfall mm (inches)	34 (1.3)	29 (1.1)	31 (1.2)	43 (1.7)	61 (2.4)	19 (0.7)	1 (0.0)	4 (0.2)	98 (3.9)	133 (5.2)	110 (4.3)	97 (3.8)	660 (25.8)
Average rainy days (≥ 0.1 mm)	0.4	0.1	2.1	2.3	1.8	5.8	7.8	12.1	5.5	1.6	1.5	1.5	42.5
Average snowy days	9.8	7.8	10.2	9.6	9.8	3.5	0.2	0.9	10.8	14.8	14.9	16.7	109
Average relative humidity (%)	88	89	89	86	86	86	83	79	72	72	75	83	82
Mean daily daylight hours	0	5	11.7	18.4	24	24	24	21.1	13.7	7.6	0.5	0	12.5
Average ultraviolet index	1	1	1	1	1	2	2	2	1	1	1	1	1
Source: Weather Atlas

== Education ==
Kullorsuaq has a small school for about 50 children.
