= Ikermiut =

- Location within Greenland
- Coordinates: 74°20′05″N 56°59′30″W
- Sovereign state: Kingdom of Denmark
- Autonomous country: Greenland
- Municipality: Avannaata
- Founded: 1916
- Abandoned: 1954
- Time zone: UTC-03

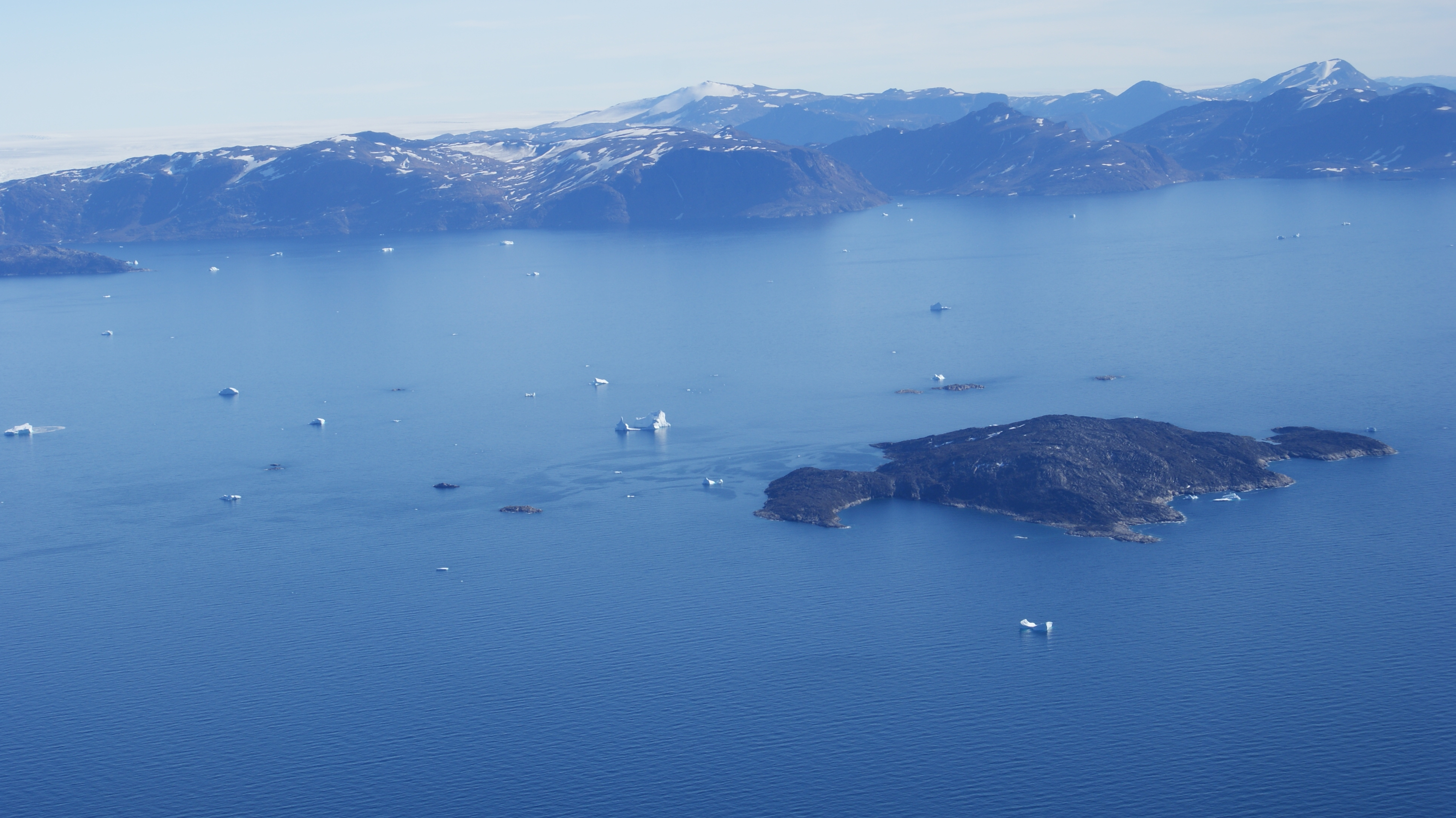
Aerial view of southern Inussulik Bay, with Ikermiut island in the foreground and Nuussuaq Peninsula on the horizon.

Ikermiut is a former settlement in Avannaata municipality in northwestern Greenland. It was located on Ikermiut Island in the center of Inussulik Bay, a bay in the northern part of Upernavik Archipelago. The settlement was abandoned in 1954 in favor of more northerly settlements of Nuussuaq and Kullorsuaq, due to rough sea waves of Inussulik Bay overflowing the island.
