= Qeqertarsuaq Island (Karrat Fjord) =

Island in Avannaata, Greenland

Coordinates: 71°34′N 53°10′W

Qeqertarsuaq (meaning "Large Island") is an island in Avannaata municipality, located in the Karrat Fjord in northwestern Greenland. Nearby islands are Illorsuit Island and Upernivik Island.

The island has a settlement called Nuugaatsiaq.

The island has a 1,765-metre-high (5,791 ft) mountain called Snehætten (meaning Snow hat in Danish), an Ultra prominent peak.

== See also ==
- List of islands of Greenland
- Qeqertarsuaq
