= Ikerasassuaq Strait =

Channel in Greenland

Coordinates: 73°50′N 55°55′W

Ikerasassuaq Strait is a strait of Greenland. It is located in the Upernavik Archipelago.
