= Raffles Island =

Island in Sermersooq, Greenland

Native name: Raffles Ø
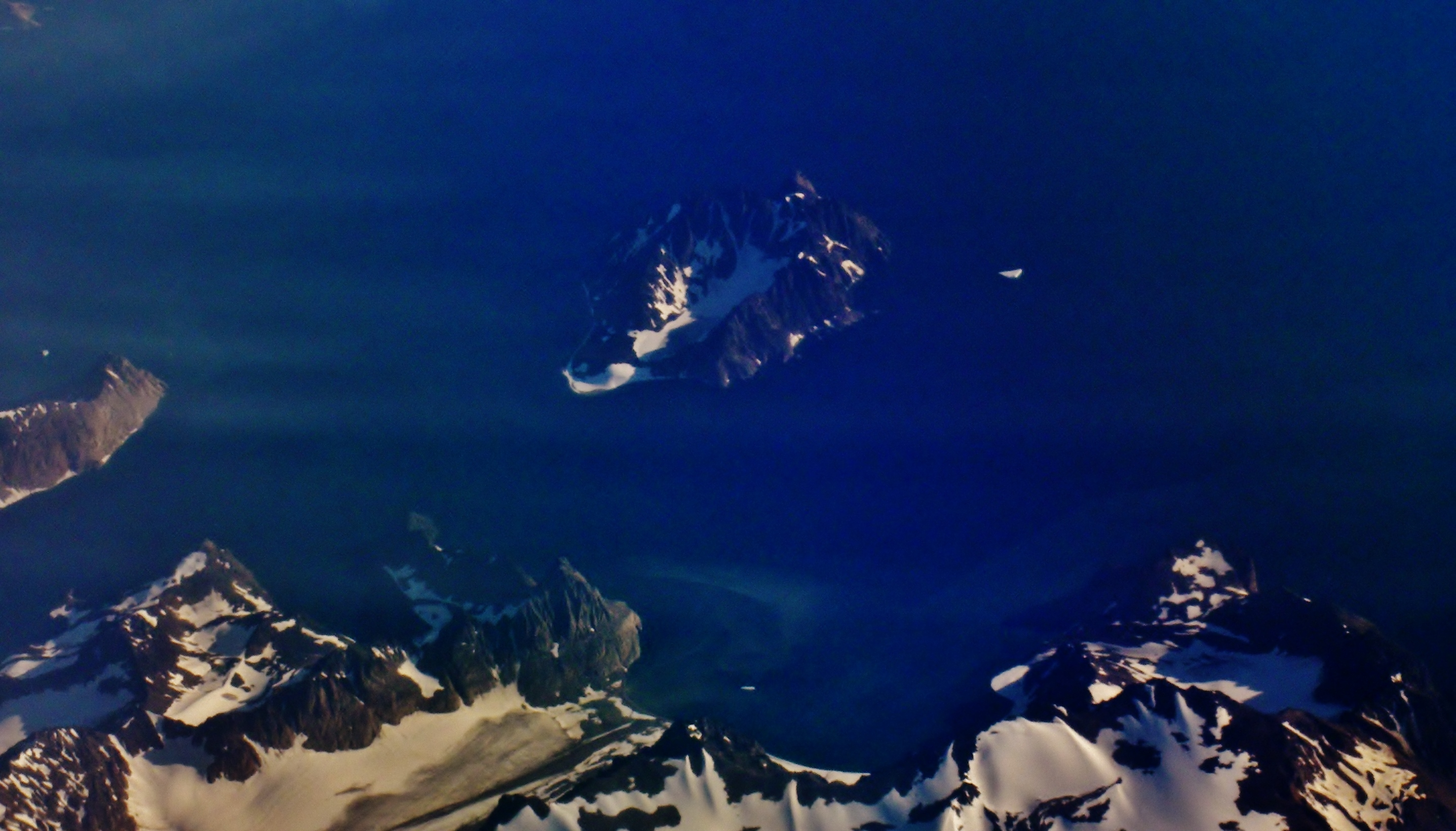
- Interactive map of Raffles Island

Geography
- Location: East-Greenland
- Coordinates: 74°34′N 21°31′W
- Highest point: 550 m

Administration
- Greenland
- Semersooq (Østgrønland)

Demographics
- Population: 0

Raffles Island is an uninhabited island located approximately 4 km to east of the Sparrebugt bay, Liverpool Land, about 20 km north-east of the town of Ittoqqortoormiit, Greenland in the Scoresby Sund area.

== Description ==
It was named by William Scoresby Jr. in 1822 as Raffles Island in honour of Reverend Thomas Raffles (1788–1863), a prominent independent minister. The alternative native Greenlandic names of Agpalik or Appalik are also in use. It is also known with the Danish names of Raffle Ø or Raffles Ø.

The highest point of the island lies at 550m above the sea level. The island hosts a little lake, called Raffles Sø. Its mean temperature is almost always close to 0 degrees Celsius. Gull colonies have been recorded on the island.

== See also ==
- List of islands of Greenland
