= Paornivik Island =

Island in Avannaata, Greenland

Paornivik
- Location within Greenland

Geography
- Location: Greenland
- Coordinates: 73°47′N 56°04′W
- Archipelago: Upernavik Archipelago

Administration
- Greenland
- Municipality: Avannaata

Paornivik Island is an uninhabited island in Avannaata municipality in northwestern Greenland.

== Geography ==
The horseshoe-shaped Paornivik Island is located in Tasiusaq Bay, in the north-central part of Upernavik Archipelago. It is sandwiched between Qullikorsuit Island in the north − from which it is separated by the narrow Paorniviup Tunua strait − and Mernoq Island in the southwest. To the east, inner waterways of Tasiusaq Bay separate it from an unnamed nunatak on the mainland of Greenland.

== See also ==
- List of islands of Greenland
