= Saarlia Island =

Island in Greenland

Saarlia
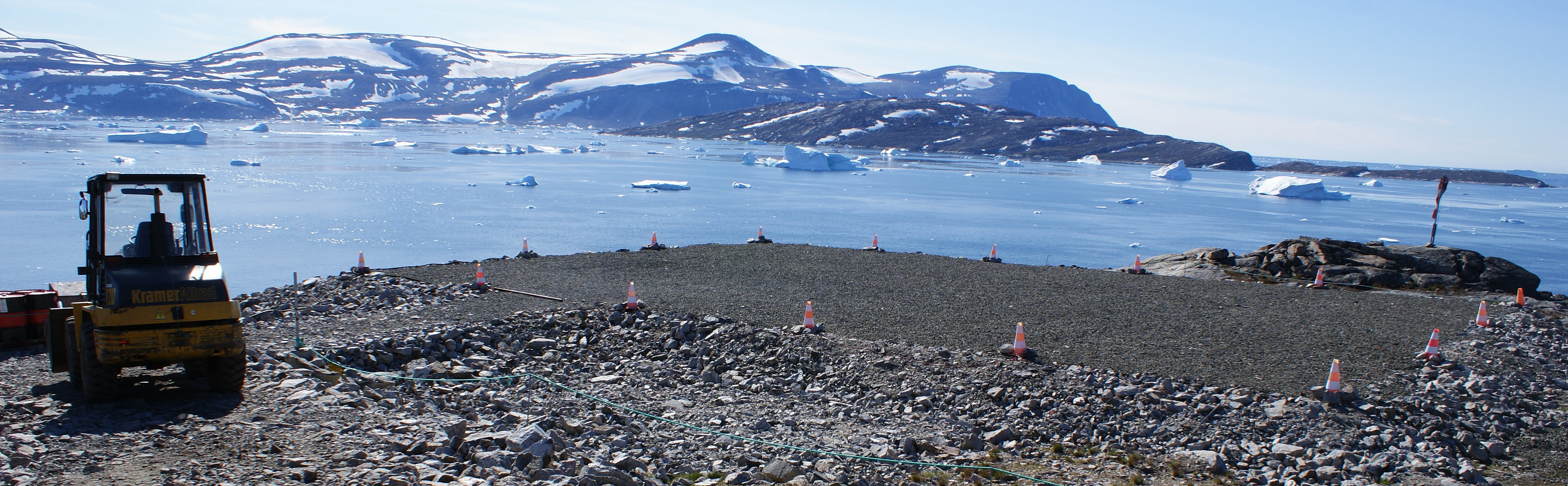
- Saarlia Island and Kiatassuaq Island (behind) seen from Kullorsuaq Heliport

- Location within Greenland

Geography
- Location: Greenland
- Coordinates: 74°32′50″N 57°19′00″W
- Archipelago: Upernavik Archipelago

Administration
- Greenland
- Municipality: Avannaata

Saarlia Island (old spelling: Sârdlia) is an uninhabited island in Avannaata municipality in northwestern Greenland.

== Geography ==
Part of the Upernavik Archipelago, Saarlia Island is located in the southern part of Melville Bay, approximately 3.7 km (2.3 mi) north of Kiatassuaq Island, and 2.7 km (1.7 mi) to the southwest of Kullorsuaq settlement on Kullorsuaq Island. The highest point on the island is an unnamed 200 m (660 ft) hill in the center of the island.
