= Kuuk =

- Location within Greenland
- Coordinates: 73°42′20″N 56°11′40″W
- Sovereign state: Kingdom of Denmark
- Autonomous country: Greenland
- Municipality: Avannaata
- Founded: 1891
- Abandoned: 1972
- Time zone: UTC-03

Kuuk (old spelling: Kûk) is a former settlement in the Avannaata municipality in northwestern Greenland. It was located in the north-central part of Upernavik Archipelago, on the southern cape of Mernoq Island, an island in Tasiusaq Bay. The settlement was abandoned in 1972. The most likely reason for its abandonment is the shifting of the ice which it was built on and the climate in the region. The settlement remains labeled on maps of Greenland and online maps.
