= Qeqertarsuaq Island (Kangerlussuaq Icefjord) =

Island in Greenland

Qeqertarsuaq
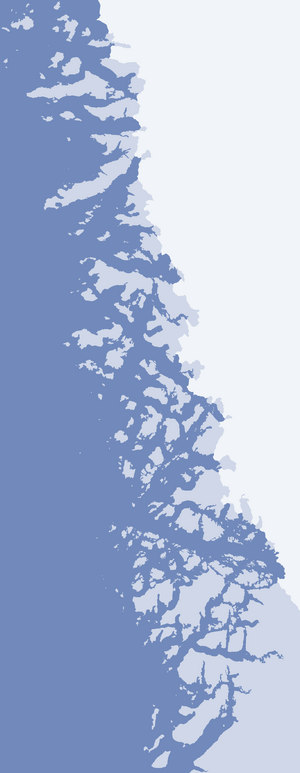
- Location within Upernavik Archipelago

Geography
- Location: Baffin Bay, Greenland
- Coordinates: 73°52′N 55°51′W
- Archipelago: Upernavik Archipelago

Administration
- Greenland
- Municipality: Avannaata

Demographics
- Population: uninhabited

Qeqertarsuaq Island is an island of Greenland. It is located in Baffin Bay in the Kangerlussuaq Icefjord of the Upernavik Archipelago.

== See also ==
- List of islands of Greenland
