= Inussullissuaq Island =

Island in Greenland

Inussullissuaq
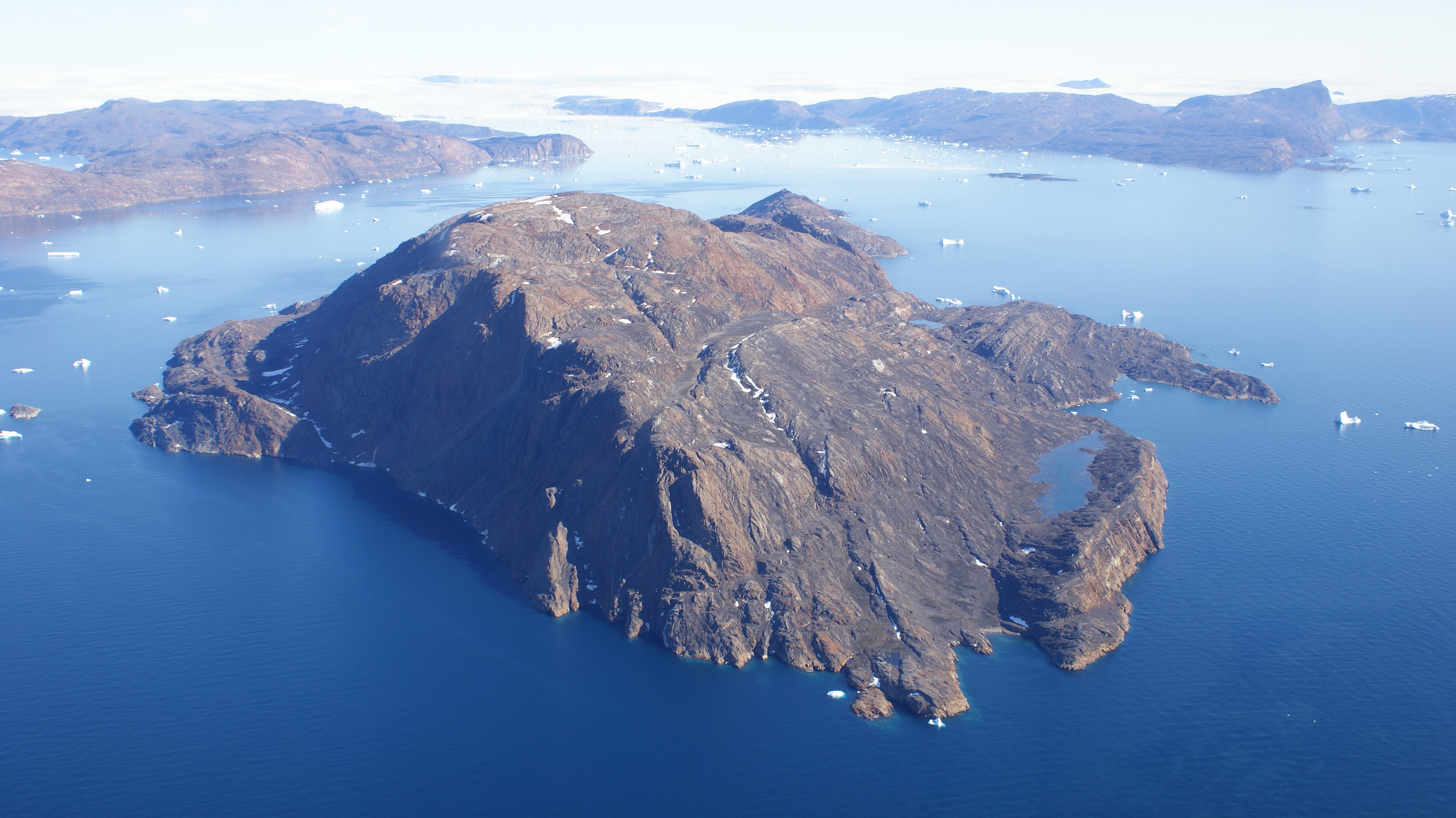
- Aerial view of Inussullissuaq Island

- Location within Greenland

Geography
- Location: Greenland
- Coordinates: 74°24′50″N 57°0′0″W
- Archipelago: Upernavik Archipelago
- Length: 1.9 km (1.18 mi)
- Width: 6.3 km (3.91 mi)

Administration
- Greenland
- Municipality: Avannaata

Inussulissuaq Island (old spelling: Inugsuligssuaq) is a small uninhabited island in the Melville Bay region of the Upernavik Archipelago in Avannaata municipality in northwestern Greenland. The name of the island means "a large cairn" in the Greenlandic language.

== Geography ==
Inussulissuaq Island is located in the northern part of Inussulik Bay, approximately 6 km (3.7 mi) south of Kiatassuaq Island, and 8.5 km (5.3 mi) west of the mainland Sanningassorsuaq Peninsula. There is a small freshwater lake on the southern coast. The highest point on the island is an unnamed summit at 560 m (1,840 ft).

=== Promontories ===
| Direction | Latitude N | Longitude W |
|---|---|---|
| Northern Cape | 74°25′54″ | 57°01′18″ |
| Eastern Cape | 74°24′41″ | 56°53′50″ |
| Southern Cape | 74°24′05″ | 57°00′00″ |
| Western Cape | 74°25′10″ | 57°05′50″ |

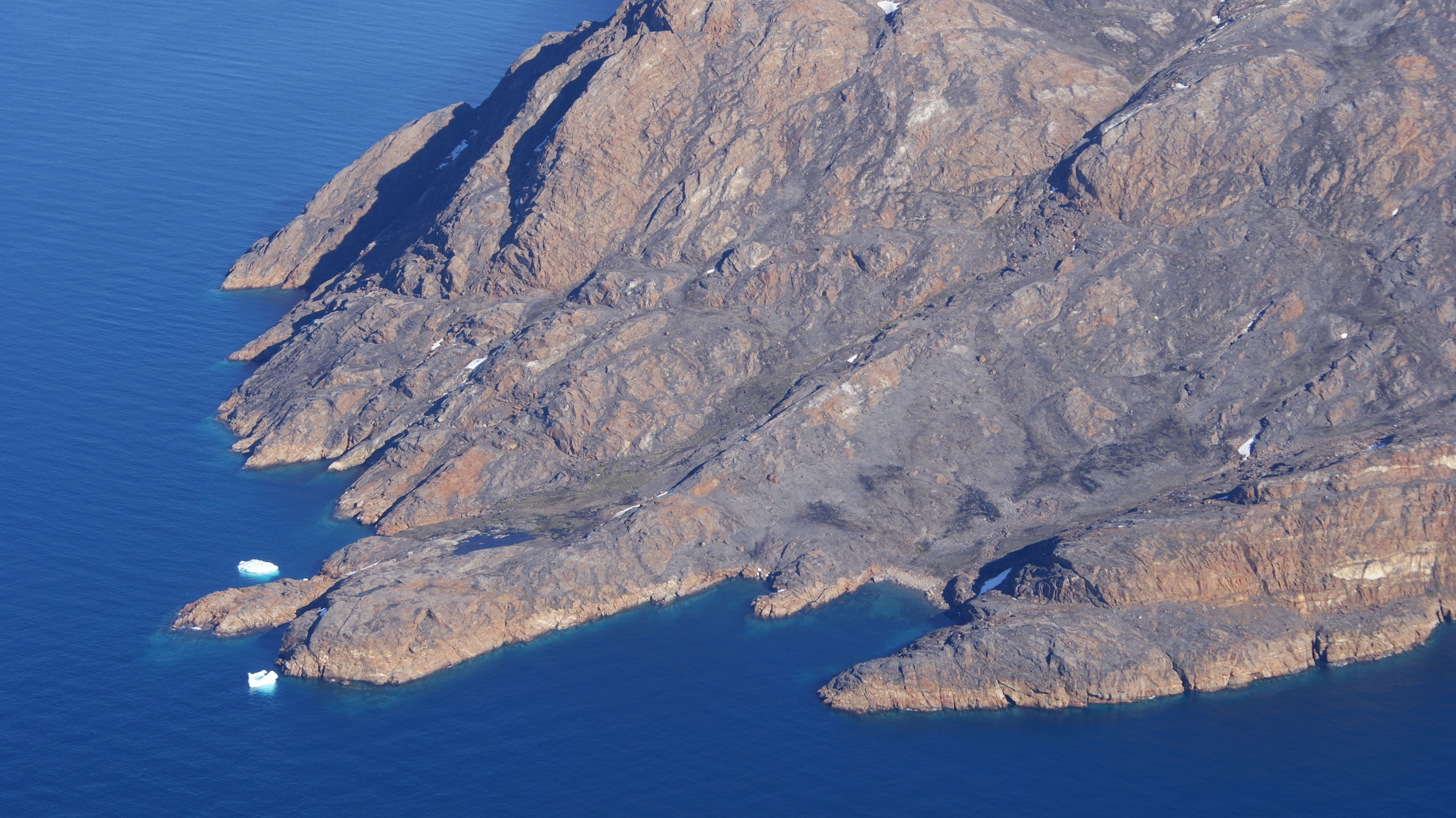
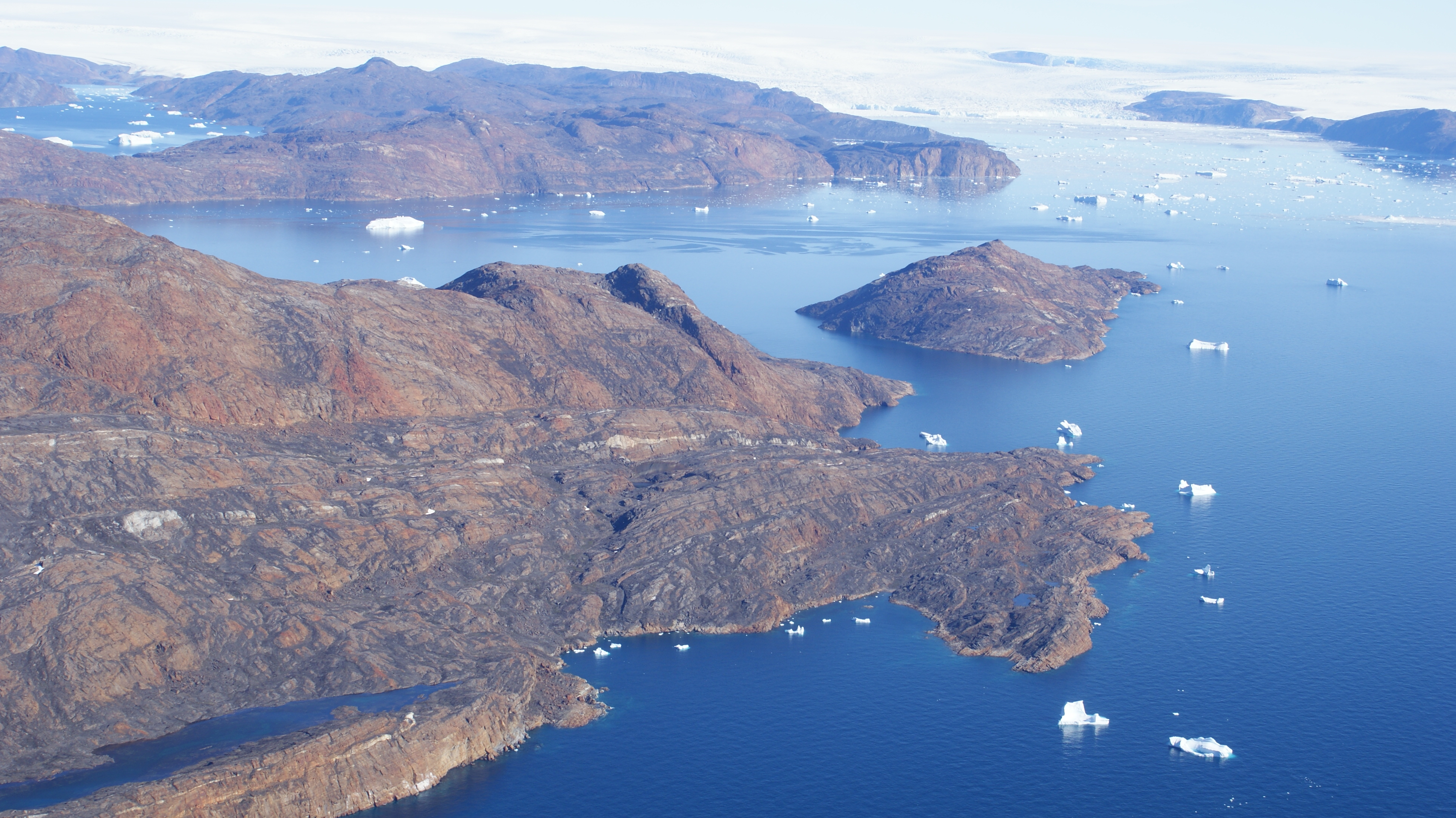
Left: western cape. Right: eastern cape

== History ==
Inussullissuaq Island has never been permanently inhabited due to its small size. In 1930 it briefly served as a polar station for Knud Rasmussen, the Greenlandic polar explorer and anthropologist. The station was named Bjørne Borg (or Bjørneborg, a bear castle). Its ruins can still be found on the island.

== Settlement ==
Kullorsuaq is the closest settlement to the island, located on an island of the same name to the north of Kiatassuaq Island, 19.6 km (12.2 mi) away. In the south, the Nuussuaq village on the southern coast of Nuussuaq Peninsula is located 33.4 km (20.8 mi). The island is accessible only by boat, and thus the distances to reach it are longer due to the need to navigate around the Kiatassuaq Island and Nuussuaq Peninsula, respectively.
