= Akilia =

Island in southwestern Greenland

Akilia Island
- Location of the Akilia Island in Greenland
- Interactive map of Akilia Island

Geography
- Coordinates: 63°56′23″N 51°40′29″W
- Adjacent to: Davis Strait
- Area: 138 ha (340 acres)

Administration
- Greenland
- Municipality: Sermersooq

Demographics
- Population: 0 (2023)
- Pop. density: 0/km^{2} (0/sq mi)

Akilia Island is an island in southwestern Greenland, about 22 kilometers south of Nuuk. Akilia is the location of a rock formation that has been proposed to contain the oldest known sedimentary rocks on Earth, and perhaps the oldest evidence of life on Earth.

== Geology ==
The rocks in question are part of a metamorphosed supracrustal sequence located at the south-western tip of the island. The sequence has been dated as no younger than 3.85 billion years old - that is, in the Hadean eon - based on the age of an igneous band that cuts the rock. The supracrustal sequence contains layers rich in iron and silica, which are variously interpreted as banded iron formation, chemical sediments from submarine hot springs, or hydrothermal vein deposits. Carbon in the rock, present as graphite, shows low levels of carbon-13, which may suggest an origin as isotopically light organic matter derived from living organisms. However, this interpretation is complicated because of high-grade metamorphism that affected the Akilia rocks after their formation. The sedimentary origin, age and the carbon content of the rocks have been questioned.

If the Akilia rocks do show evidence of life by 3.85 Ga, it would challenge models which suggest that Earth would not be hospitable to life at this time.

== See also ==
- List of islands of Greenland
- Origin of life
