= Qeqertarsuaq Island (Upernavik Icefjord) =

Island of Greenland

Qeqertarsuaq
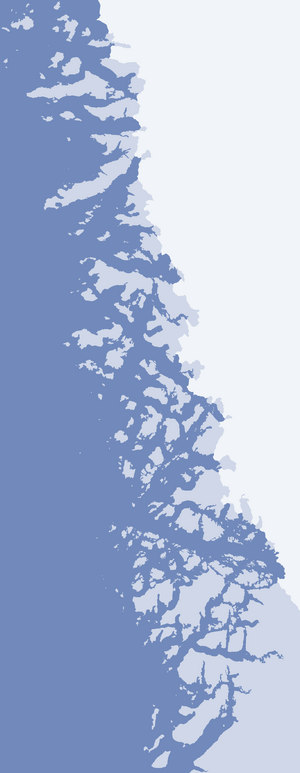
- Location within Upernavik Archipelago

Geography
- Location: Baffin Bay, Greenland
- Coordinates: 72°51′N 54°54′W
- Archipelago: Upernavik Archipelago

Administration
- Greenland
- Municipality: Avannaata

Demographics
- Population: uninhabited

Qeqertarsuaq Island is an island of Greenland. It is located in Baffin Bay in the Upernavik Icefjord of the Upernavik Archipelago.

== See also ==
- List of islands of Greenland
