= Qeqertaq Island =

Island in Greenland

Qeqertaq
Nickname: Qeqertarsuaq
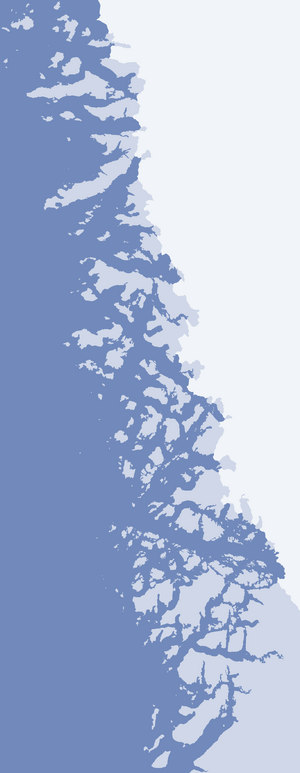
- Location of Qeqertaq in Greenland Qeqertaq (Greenland)
- Interactive map of Qeqertaq

Geography
- Location: Melville Bay
- Coordinates: 72°16′N 55°20′W
- Archipelago: Upernavik Archipelago
- Adjacent to: Baffin Bay
- Area: 250.03 km^{2} (96.54 sq mi)
- Area rank: 28th largest in Greenland

Administration
- Greenland
- Municipality: Avannaata
- Largest settlement: Upernavik Kujalleq (Søndre Upernavik)

Demographics
- Population: 201 (2021)
- Pop. density: 0.8/km^{2} (2.1/sq mi)

Additional information
- Time zone: UTC-03

Qeqertarsuaq, also known as Qeqertaq meaning just "Island", is an island in Avannaata municipality, near Upernavik, in northwestern Greenland. It is located in the Upernavik Archipelago in the Melville Bay of the Baffin Bay.

== Geography ==
Qeqertaq is the second largest island in the Upernavik Archipelago, after Nutaarmiut. The only settlement is Upernavik Kujalleq (Søndre Upernavik) near Qugdlungut, its southern cape. The island is located towards the southern end of the archipelago, separated from the mainland shore by a narrow sound and has an area of 250.03 km^{2}.

'Qeqertarsuaq' (meaning "Large Island") is the name of several islands in Greenland. The island near Upernavik should not be confused with the much larger Qeqertarsuaq island, better known as Disko Island, or the smaller Qeqertarsuaq (Herbert Island) island near Qaanaaq (Thule). 'Qeqertaq' is also the name of another island near Upernavik (Danish: Skalø) and of a settlement in Qasigiannguit.

== See also ==
- List of islands of Greenland
