= Saattoq Island =

Island in Greenland

Coordinates: 73.51676°N 56.11849°W

Saattoq Island is an island of Greenland. It is located in Baffin Bay in the Upernavik Archipelago.
