= Illorsuit Island =

Island in Avannaata municipality in northwestern Greenland

Native name: Illorsuip qeqertaat
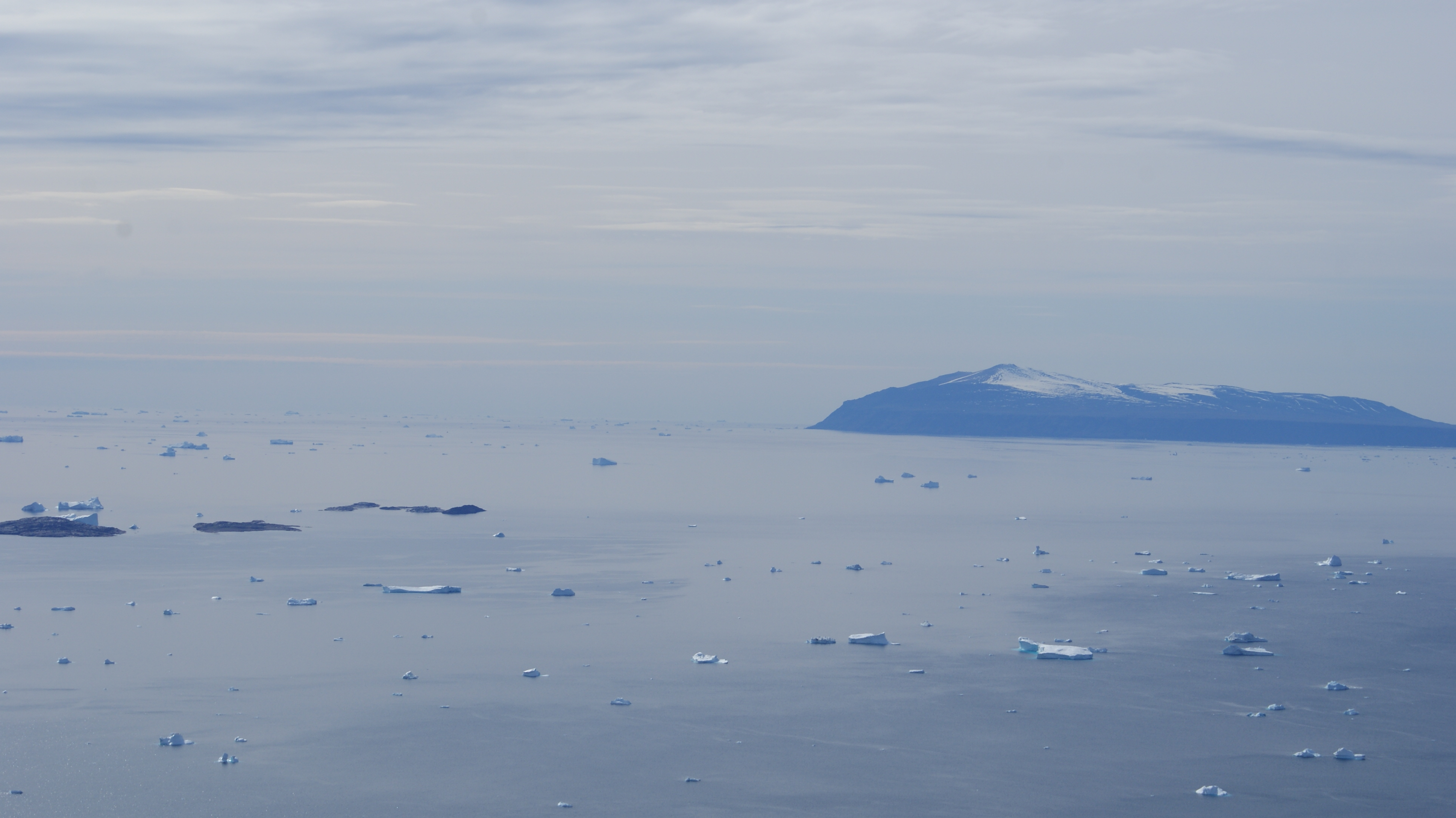
- The southern part of Illorsuit Island seen across the Uummannaq Fjord, from the western ridge of the Nunaarssuaq mountain on the Ukkusissat Peninsula.

- Location of Upernivik Island in Greenland
- Interactive map of Illorsuit Island

Geography
- Location: Uummannaq Fjord
- Coordinates: 71°9′N 52°41′W
- Area: 403 km^{2} (156 sq mi)
- Area rank: 21st largest in Greenland
- Length: 31 km (19.3 mi)
- Width: 21 km (13 mi)
- Highest elevation: 1,150 m (3770 ft)

Administration
- Greenland
- Municipality: Avannaata

Demographics
- Population: 0 (2022)
- Pop. density: 0/km^{2} (0/sq mi)
- Ethnic groups: none

Illorsuit Island (Greenlandic: Illorsuip qeqertaat, Danish: Ubekendt Ejland) is an island in the Avannaata municipality in northwestern Greenland.

== Geography ==
location of Illorsuit Island

The island is pear-shaped, and at 403 km^{2} (155.6 mi^{2}), it is the second-largest island in the Uummannaq Fjord system, located to the east of its mouth, between Sigguup Nunaa peninsula in the north and Nuussuaq Peninsula in the south.

== Settlement ==
The former settlement of Illorsuit was the only settlement on the island, located on its northeastern coast. The settlement was abandoned in 2018 following a severe tsunami in June 2017.
