= Horse Head Island =

Uninhabited island in northwestern Greenland

Horse Head
- Location within Greenland

Geography
- Location: Greenland
- Coordinates: 73°37′50″N 57°01′20″W
- Archipelago: Upernavik Archipelago

Administration
- Greenland
- Municipality: Avannaata

Horse Head Island (Greenlandic: Appalersalik, old spelling: Agpalersalik) is an uninhabited island in Avannaata municipality in northwestern Greenland.

== Geography ==
Horse Head Island is an outlying island in Tasiusaq Bay, an indentation of Baffin Bay in the north-central part of Upernavik Archipelago. The closest island is Tuttorqortooq Island in the east.
