= Singarnaq-Annertussoq Island =

Island in Avannaata, Greenland

Coordinates: 72°35′N 55°48′W

Singarnaq-Annertussoq Island is an island of Greenland. It is located in Baffin Bay in the Upernavik Archipelago.
