= Taartoq Island =

Island in Upernavik, Greenland

Coordinates: 72°57′N 55°57′W

Taartoq Island is an island of Greenland. It is located in Baffin Bay in the Upernavik Archipelago.
