= Naajaat Island =

Island in Greenland

Naajaat
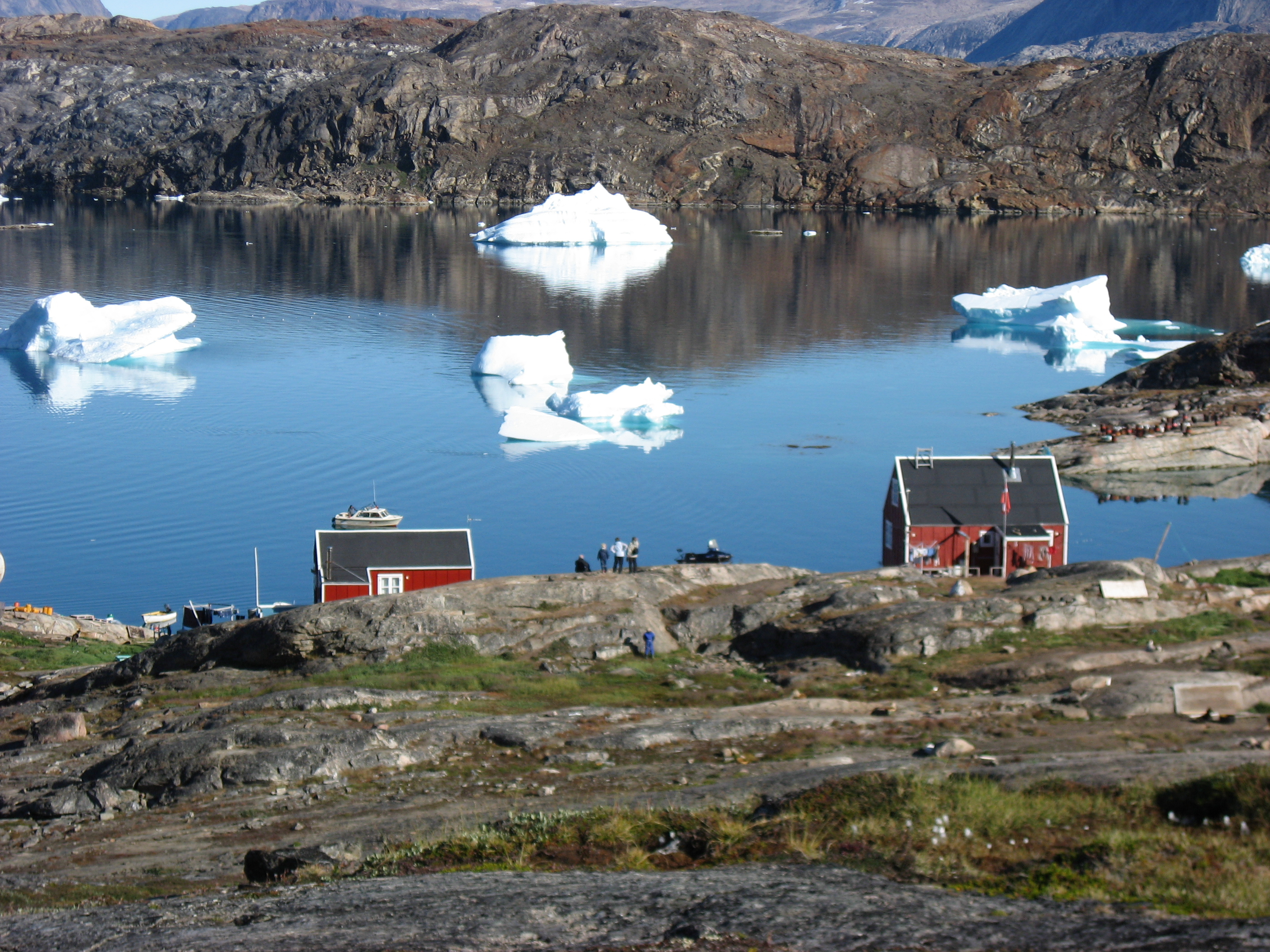
- Naajaat settlement on the eastern coast

- Location within Greenland

Geography
- Location: Greenland
- Coordinates: 73°08′40″N 55°49′00″W
- Archipelago: Upernavik Archipelago

Administration
- Greenland
- Municipality: Avannaata

Naajaat Island (old spellings: Naujât, Naujat, Naajat) is a small island in Avannaata municipality in northwestern Greenland, home to the Naajaat settlement.

== Geography ==
Naajaat Island is located in Tasiusaq Bay, in the South-Central part of Upernavik Archipelago. The inner waterways of the bay separate it from Innaarsuit Island in the west, and from the mainland Qassersuaq Peninsula in the southeast. The island is part of a small group of larger skerries, trailed by Naajaat Kangilleq in the northeast, and Sanningassorsuaq in the southeast. The narrow channels between the three islands provide good harbourage for the settlement.
