= Maniitsoq Island (Upernavik Archipelago) =

Island in Greenland

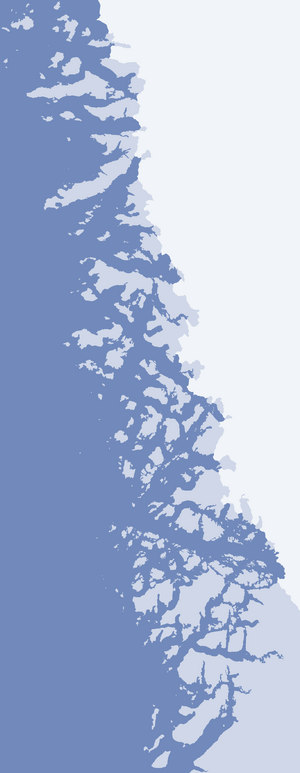
- Location within Upernavik Archipelago

Geography
- Location: Baffin Bay, Greenland
- Coordinates: 72°58′N 55°13′W
- Archipelago: Upernavik Archipelago

Administration
- Greenland
- Municipality: Avannaata

Demographics
- Population: uninhabited

Maniitsoq is an island of Greenland. It is located in Tasiusaq Bay in the Upernavik Archipelago.

== See also ==
- List of islands of Greenland
