= Atilissuaq Island =

Island in Greenland

Coordinates: 72°48′N 55°53′W

Atilissuaq Island is an island of Greenland. It is located in Baffin Bay in the Upernavik Archipelago. The area is 22.1 square kilometers.
