= Kiataussaq Island =

Island in Greenland

Kiataussaq
- Location within Greenland

Geography
- Location: Melville Bay, Greenland
- Coordinates: 74°43′30″N 57°32′0″W
- Archipelago: Upernavik Archipelago
- Length: 8.3 km (5.16 mi)
- Width: 3.7 km (2.3 mi)

Administration
- Greenland
- Municipality: Avannaata

Kiataussaq Island (Danish: Amdrup Ø) is an uninhabited island in Avannaata municipality in northwestern Greenland.

== Geography ==
Kiataussaq Island is the northernmost island of any size in the northernmost part of Upernavik Archipelago, located approximately 8.5 km (5.3 mi) to the west of the Nunatarsuaq nunataq on the mainland of Greenland. To the north of the island, only small skerries of diminishing size dot the surface of southern Melville Bay. The island is rocky, culminating in an unnamed 420 m (1,380 ft) peak in the western part of the island.

=== Skerries ===
Kiataussaq Island is surrounded by several skerries in the north and west: collectively known as Kiataussaq Skerries (Greenlandic: Kiataussap Qeqertarsue, Danish: Bluhme øer):

- Qaarusulik (Danish: Bloch ø)
- Qeqertannguit
- Natsiarsiorfik
- Nanotralikassak
- Qilalukiarfik
- Uvingassoq
- Qamutikassait
