= Puugutaa Island =

Island in Avannaata, Greenland

- Location within Greenland

Geography
- Location: Tasiusaq Bay, Greenland
- Coordinates: 73°00′N 55°30′W
- Archipelago: Upernavik Archipelago
- Highest elevation: 699 m (2293 ft)

Administration
- Greenland

Demographics
- Population: 0

Puugutaa Island is an island of Greenland.

== Geography ==
It is located in Tasiusaq Bay in the Upernavik Archipelago.

== See also ==
- List of islands of Greenland
