= Qasse Island =

Island of Greenland

Qassi
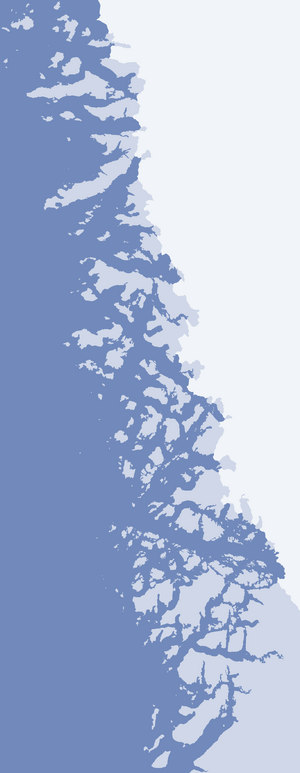

Geography
- Location: Davis Strait
- Coordinates: 72.9175°N 56.00°W
- Archipelago: Upernavik
- Area: 13.25 km^{2} (5.12 sq mi)
- Coastline: 29.14 km (18.11 mi)

Demographics
- Population: 0

Additional information
- Time zone: UTC-3:00

Qasse also known as Qassi Island is an uninhabited island in Greenland. It is located in Baffin Bay in the Upernavik Archipelago. The area of the island is about 13.25 km^{2} of area and about 29.14 km of coastline.
