= Ikermiut Island =

Island in Greenland

Ikermiut
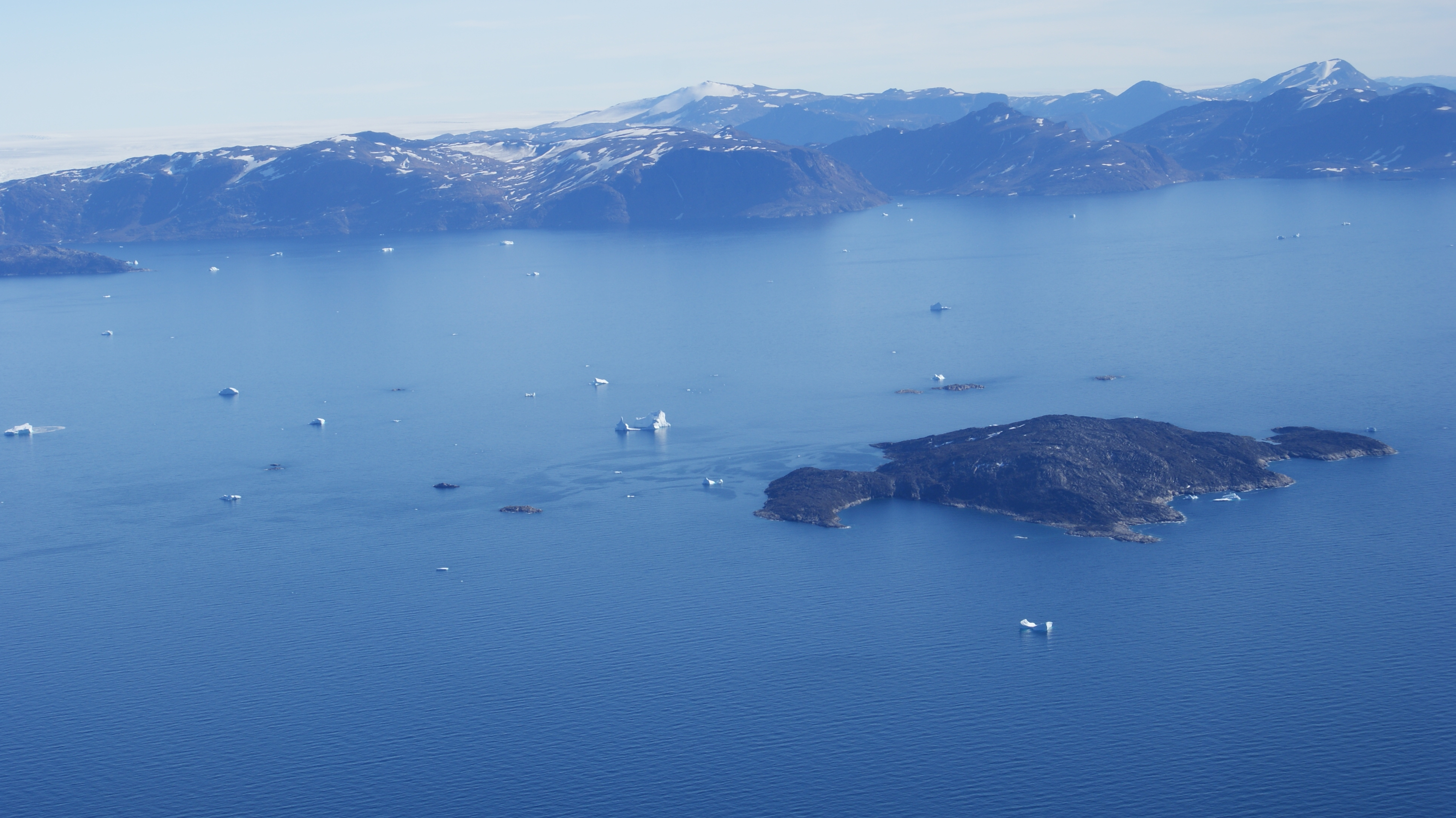
- Aerial view of Ikermiut Island

- Location within Greenland

Geography
- Location: Greenland
- Coordinates: 74°20′15″N 56°58′50″W
- Archipelago: Upernavik Archipelago

Administration
- Greenland
- Municipality: Avannaata

Ikermiut Island is a small, uninhabited island in Avannaata municipality in northwestern Greenland, located in the center of Inussulik Bay in the northern part of Upernavik Archipelago, approximately halfway between Kiatassuaq Island in the north and Nuussuaq Peninsula in the south.

== History ==
Ikermiut Island was permanently inhabited between 1916 and 1954, when a small settlement of the same name existed on the island. The settlement was abandoned in 1954, during the post-war consolidation phase in northwestern Greenland.
