= Naajaat =

Settlement in Greenland

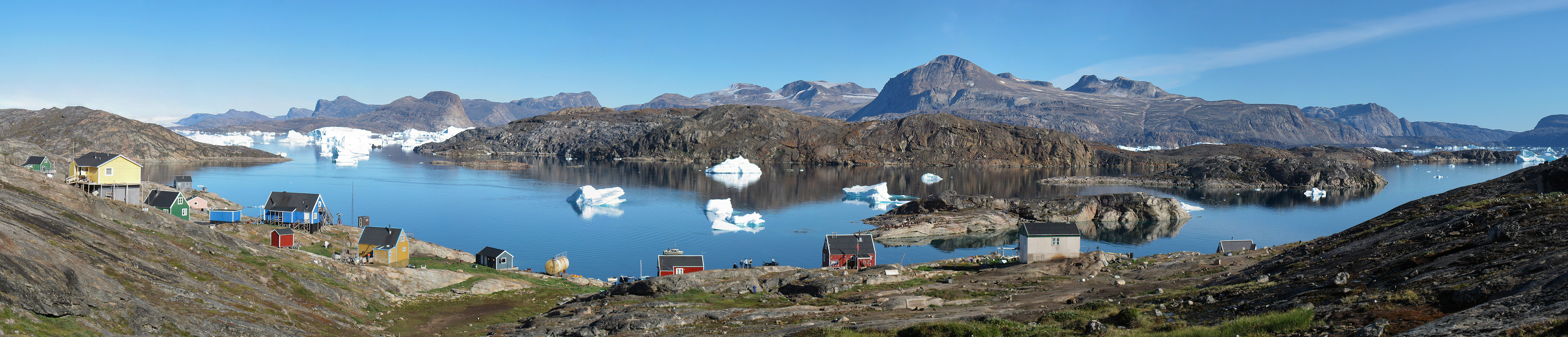
- Fjerling in 2010

- Location within Greenland
- Coordinates: 73°08′35″N 55°48′25″W
- State: Kingdom of Denmark
- Constituent country: Greenland
- Municipality: Avannaata

Population (2025)
  - Total: 45
- Time zone: UTC−02:00 (Western Greenland Time)
  - Summer (DST): UTC−01:00 (Western Greenland Summer Time)
- Postal code: 3962 Upernavik

Naajaat is a settlement in Avannaata municipality in northwestern Greenland. Former spellings include. Located on a small island of the same name, the settlement had 43 inhabitants as of 1 January 2024.

== Upernavik Archipelago ==
Naajaat within the Upernavik Archipelago

Naajaat is located within Upernavik Archipelago, a vast archipelago of small islands on the coast of northeastern Baffin Bay. The archipelago extends from the northwestern coast of Sigguup Nunaa peninsula in the south at approximately 71°50′N 56°00′W to the southern end of Melville Bay (Greenlandic: Qimusseriarsuaq) in the north at approximately 74°50′N 57°30′W.

== Infrastructure ==
In Naajaat, there is no shop available. The nearest shop and post office are located approximately 10 km to the northwest in Innaarsuit.

While the sea surrounding Naajaat offers excellent fishing opportunities, local fishermen must sail to Innaarsuit to sell their catch.

== Population ==
The population of Naajaat has been relatively stable over the last the 2000s and 2010s.

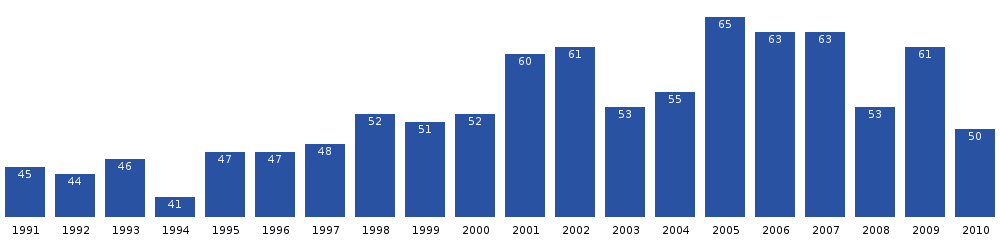
Naajaat population growth dynamics in the last two decades. Source: Statistics Greenland
