= Qaarsorsuatsiaq Island =

Island in Avannaata, Greenland

Qaarsorsuatsiaq
- Location within Greenland

Geography
- Location: Greenland
- Coordinates: 73°11′N 56°15′W
- Archipelago: Upernavik Archipelago

Administration
- Greenland
- Municipality: Avannaata

Qaarsorsuatsiaq Island (old spelling: Qaersorssuatsiaq) is an island in Avannaata municipality in northwestern Greenland.

== Geography ==
Qaarsorsuatsiaq Island is located in the outer belt of islands in Tasiusaq Bay, in the south-central part of Upernavik Archipelago. The inner waterways of Tasiusaq Bay separate it from Innaarsuit Island in the east. Several skerries buffer the western coast of the island. The highest point on the island is Cuthbert Peak in the west, reaching 320 m (1,050 ft).
