= Tukingassoq Island =

Island in Baffin Bay, Greenland

Tukingasek
- Location within Greenland

Geography
- Location: Baffin Bay, Greenland
- Coordinates: 72°10′N 55°53′W
- Archipelago: Upernavik Archipelago

Tukingassoq Island is an island of Greenland. It is located in Baffin Bay in the Upernavik Archipelago. On 14 July 1921, the Bele, a ship chartered by Knud Rasmussen's Fifth Thule Expedition struck a rock near the island, dooming the expedition. The ship was lost and all 42 passengers had to take refuge ashore. Tukingassoq Island is used a point to designate the territorial sea of Greenland by the United Nations.

As of 2003, breeding species of black guillemot have been sighted there.
