= Iperaq Island =

Island in Greenland

Coordinates: 72°31′N 55°41′W

Iperaq Island is an island of Greenland. It is located in Baffin Bay in the Upernavik Archipelago and neighbors the island of Angnertussoq.
