= Mernoq Island =

Island in Avannaata, Greenland

Mernoq
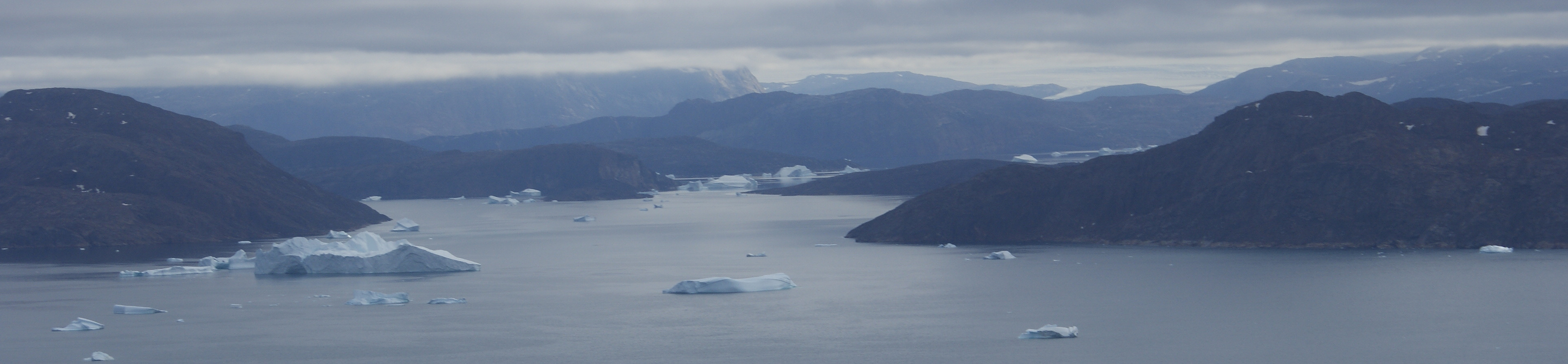
- Aerial view of Mernoq Island (right)

- Location within Greenland

Geography
- Location: Greenland
- Coordinates: 73°44′50″N 56°17′00″W
- Archipelago: Upernavik Archipelago
- Length: 9.7 km (6.03 mi)

Administration
- Greenland
- Municipality: Avannaata

Mernoq Island is an uninhabited island in Avannaata municipality in northwestern Greenland.

== History ==
With brief intervals of no permanent settlement, Mernoq Island was inhabited between 1891, when the Kuuk settlement was founded, and 1972, when it was abandoned. Kuuk was perched on the southern end of the island, at the Qernertunnguaq cape.

== Geography ==
Mernoq Island is located in Tasiusaq Bay, in the north-central part of Upernavik Archipelago. It is sandwiched between Qullikorsuit Island in the north − from which it is separated by the Mernup Tunua strait − Paornivik Island in the northeast, and Tuttorqortooq Island in the southwest.

The island is hilly, but not mountainous; the highest point is an unnamed hill of 386 m (1,266 ft) in the center of the island.

=== Coastline ===
The coastline of the island is generally undeveloped, with two shallow, unnamed bays in the east.

==== Promontories ====
Name	Direction	Latitude N	Longitude W
Mernup Erqua	Northwestern Cape	73°46′20″	56°24′50″
Nannuffik	Eastern Cape	73°43′13″	56°09′50″
Qernertunnguaq	Southern Cape	73°42′20″	56°11′40″
