= Qiianarteq =

Island in Greenland

- Interactive map of Qiianarteq

Geography
- Coordinates: 65°52′N 36°39′W
- Archipelago: Ammassalik Archipelago
- Adjacent to: Sermiligaaq Fjord
- Highest elevation: 998 m (3274 ft)

Administration
- Greenland
- Municipality: Sermersooq

Demographics
- Population: 0

Qiianarteq (also known as Kianartek or Qîanarteq) is an island in the municipality of Sermersooq, Greenland.
