= Karrat Island =

Island in Upernavik Archipelago, Greenland

Coordinates: 72°51′N 56°05′W

Karrat Island is an island of Greenland. It is located in Baffin Bay in the Upernavik Archipelago. It was once a prime walrus hunting ground for the Oqonermiut (Those who live on the Leeside).
