= Tuttorqortooq Island =

Island in Avannaata, Greenland

Tuttorqortooq
- Location within Greenland

Geography
- Location: Greenland
- Coordinates: 73°39′N 56°36′W
- Archipelago: Upernavik Archipelago

Administration
- Greenland
- Municipality: Avannaata

Tuttorqortooq Island (old spelling: Tugtorqortôq) is an uninhabited island in Avannaata municipality in northwestern Greenland.

== Geography ==
Tuttorqortooq Island is located in Tasiusaq Bay, in the north-central part of Upernavik Archipelago, at the mouth of Kangerlussuaq Icefjord, which separates it from Mernoq Island in the northeast. In the east, the northern tip of Qallunaat Island is separated from Tuttorqortooq by the narrow Qaqqakassaup Ikerasaa strait, widening into a bay to the southwest between the two islands. To the west, a small, rocky Horse Head Island buffers the island from the open waters of Baffin Bay. The island is mountainous, with an unnamed 587 m (1,926 ft) peak in the central-western part of the island.

=== Promontories ===
Name	Direction	Latitude N	Longitude W
Anernilik	Northern Cape	73°42′30″	56°25′00″
Inussugaarsuk	Southern Cape	73°37′13″	56°35′00″
Itillissuaq	Southwestern Cape	73°36′42″	56°49′15″
Tuttorqortuup Nuussua	Western Cape	73°39′45″	56°56′45″
