= Tussaaq Island =

Island in Greenland

Tussaaq
- Location within Greenland

Geography
- Location: Greenland
- Coordinates: 73°03′N 56°11′W
- Archipelago: Upernavik Archipelago

Administration
- Greenland
- Municipality: Avannaata

Tussaaq Island is an island of Greenland. It is located in Tasiusaq Bay in the Upernavik Archipelago within the Avannaata municipality.
