= Qaneq Island =

Island in Avannaata, Greenland

Qaneq

Geography
- Location: Greenland, Denmark
- Coordinates: 73.05°N 55.88333°W
- Area: 11.16 km^{2} (4.31 sq mi)
- Highest point: 339m

Additional information
- Time zone: UTC-3
  - Summer (DST): UTC-2 (UTC)

Qaneq Island is an island of Greenland. It is located in Tasiusaq Bay in the Upernavik Archipelago. The area is 11.2 square kilometers.
