= Upernivik Island =

Island in Greenland

Native name: Upernivik Ø
- Location of Upernivik Island in Greenland
- Interactive map of Upernivik Island

Geography
- Location: Uummannaq Fjord
- Coordinates: 71°16′N 52°45′W
- Area: 503 km^{2} (194 sq mi)
- Area rank: 16th largest in Greenland
- Length: 30 km (19 mi)
- Width: 24 km (14.9 mi)
- Highest elevation: 2,007 m (6585 ft)
- Highest point: Palup Qaqa

Administration
- Greenland
- Municipality: Avannaata

Demographics
- Population: 0
- Pop. density: 0/km^{2} (0/sq mi)
- Ethnic groups: none

Upernivik Island (Danish: Upernivik Ø) is an uninhabited island in Avannaata municipality in northwestern Greenland.

== Geography ==
Upernivik Island is located in the Uummannaq Fjord where it is the largest island with an area of 540 km^{2} (208.5 mi^{2}).

The island is very mountainous. Its highest point is Palup Qaqaa, an ultra-prominent peak at 71° 20' 24 N, 52° 48' 37 W reaching 2,007 m (6,585 ft).

Location of Upernivik Island.

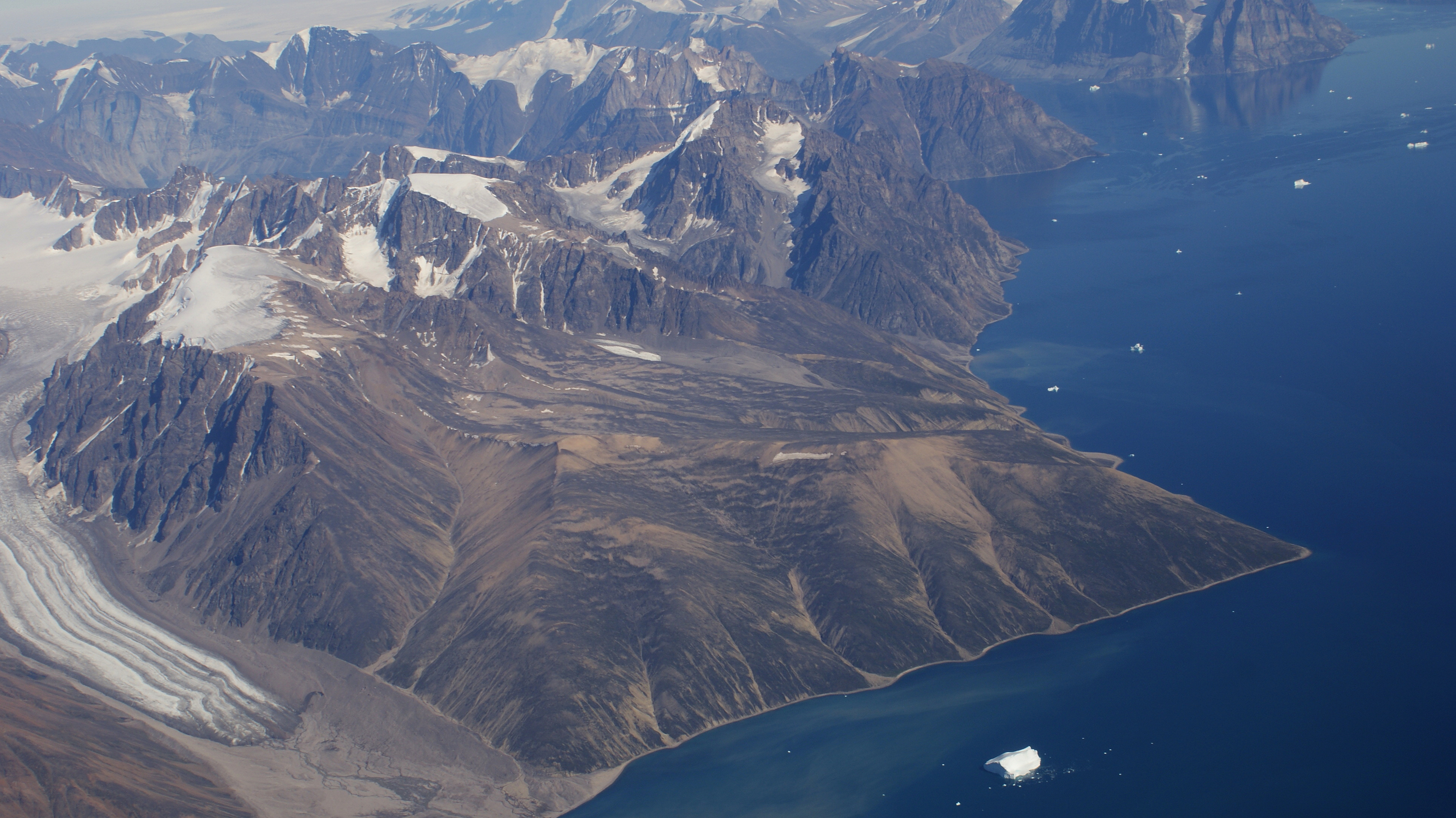
Aerial view of southwestern Upernivik Island

== See also ==
- List of islands of Greenland
