= Nunavik Peninsula =

Peninsula in northwestern Greenland

Sigguup Nunaa
- Location of Sigguup Nunaa

- Location within Greenland

Geography
- Location: W Greenland
- Coordinates: 71°53′N 54°25′W
- Adjacent to: Baffin Bay; Uummannaq Fjord; Ukkusissat Fjord
- Area: 4,500 km^{2} (1,700 sq mi)
- Length: 110 km (68 mi)
- Width: 90 km (56 mi)
- Highest elevation: 1,764 m (5787 ft)

Administration
- Greenland (Denmark)
- Municipality: Avannaata

Demographics
- Population: Uninhabited

Nunavik Peninsula (Greenlandic: Sigguup Nunaa, Danish: Svartenhuk Halvø) is a large peninsula in northwestern Greenland. It separates two cultural and geographical regions of northwestern Greenland: Uummannaq Fjord region in the southeast, and Upernavik Archipelago in the north.

== Geography ==
The peninsula extends to the south-west from mainland Greenland at (71°49′N 54°25′W) north of the Uummannaq Fjord system. The waters around the peninsula are Karrat Fjord in the east, Nordost Bay in the south and Baffin Bay in the west. The Ukkusissat Fjord carves deeply into the northeast of the peninsula, running south to north-east-north around the eastern part of the peninsula covered with the Sermikavasak glacier.

=== Inner fjords ===
Several fjords cut deep into the peninsula. Running from the western shore inland to then turn north, Sullua (4x50km) is the main waterway, cutting the peninsula into two parts, northwestern being the smaller. Parallel Umiiviup Kangerlua (4x8km) and Kangiusap Imaa (3x7km) fjord bays cut into the southeastern shore.

== Settlements ==
The peninsula is administered as part of the Avannaata municipality. It is largely uninhabited − permanent settlements are located in the Upernavik Archipelago off the north-west-northern coast of the peninsula, including Upernavik Kujalleq, Kangersuatsiaq, Upernavik town, and Aappilattoq. There used to be several settlements on the islands off the southeastern coast, including Nuugaatsiaq and Illorsuit in the Uummannaq Fjord system, although they were abandoned by 2018. Ukkusissat is the only mainland settlement in the vicinity, located on the smaller, Ukkusissat Peninsula.

== Geology ==
Rocks and sediments on Nunavik Peninsula are of Cretaceous and Paleocene origin, with further layers deposited during the movement of Greenland towards the North Pole. Similarly to the Uummannaq area, ancient volcanic basalts are exposed throughout the peninsula.

== Fauna ==
Naturally occurring land animals include Arctic foxes and Arctic hares. Muskoxen are not indigenous to the peninsula, but in 1991 31 muskoxen were released on the peninsula. In 2002 the population had a minimum of 193 animals. Reindeer were historically abundant and may possibly still be present, but the last reindeer harvested on the peninsula was in 1966. In 2022, researchers found two old reindeer antlers in the eastern part of the peninsula, but observed none that were live. Today, hunting reindeer on the peninsula is prohibited, although hunters still report unverified sightings of them.

Marine animals include narwhals, beluga whales, minke whales, fin whales, bowhead whales, ringed seals, harp seals, bearded seals, hooded seals, walruses, and polar bears.

At least 36 species of birds live and visit the peninsula, including the Canada goose, Greenland white-fronted goose, snow goose, light-bellied Brent goose, tundra swan, sandhill crane, king eider, common eider, long-tailed duck, mallard, harlequin duck, red-breasted merganser, red-throated diver, great northern diver, northern fulmar, thick-billed murre, black guillemot, razorbill, Atlantic puffin, black-legged kittiwake, glaucous gull, Iceland gull, great black-backed gull, Sabine's gull, Arctic tern, great cormorant, purple sandpiper, common ringed plover, red-necked phalarope, rock ptarmigan, common raven, snow bunting, Lapland bunting, northern wheatear, common redpoll, gyrfalcon, peregrine falcon, and white-tailed eagle.
