= Innaarsuit Island =

Island in Avannaata, Greenland

Innaarsuit
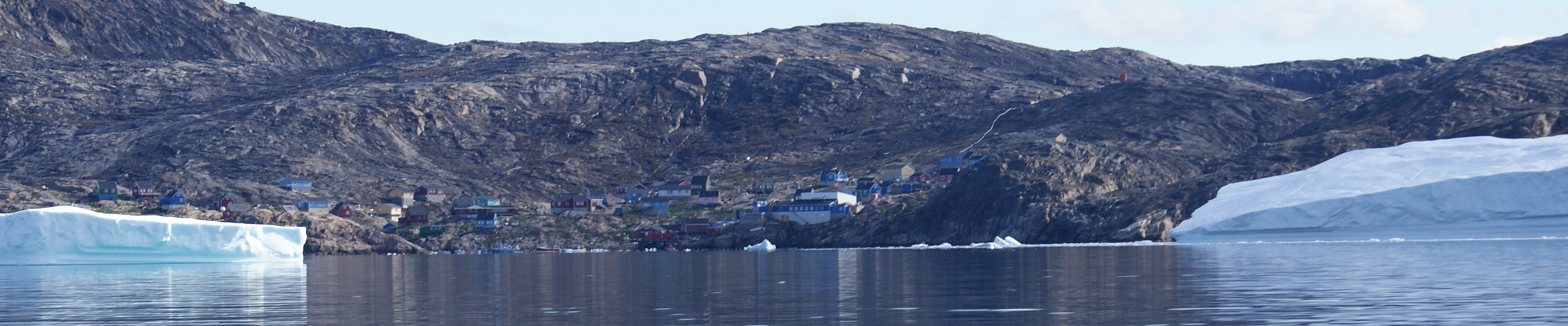
- Innaarsuit settlement on the northwestern coast

- Location within Greenland

Geography
- Location: Greenland
- Coordinates: 73°10′N 56°00′W
- Archipelago: Upernavik Archipelago

Administration
- Greenland
- Municipality: Avannaata

Innaarsuit Island (old spelling: Ivnârssuit) is an island in the Upernavik Archipelago in northwestern Greenland. It forms part of the Innaarsuit settlement in Avannaata municipality. The settlement had 166 residents in 2017, and the economy is largely based on Greenland halibut fishing and whaling. In July 2018, the village was evacuated as an iceberg weighing over 10 million tonnes, and towering over 90 m (300 ft) was headed for the settlement.

== Geography ==
Innaarsuit Island is located in the outer belt of islands in Tasiusaq Bay, in the south-central part of Upernavik Archipelago in north western Greenland, about 600 miles (970 km) north of Nuuk. The inner waterways of Tasiusaq Bay separate it from the small Naajaat Island in the east, and from Qaarsorsuatsiaq Island in the west. Several skerries buffer the southern coast of the island. The coastline of Innaarsuit Island has several small inlets indenting the shore. The island is nearly split in half in the center, with only an isthmus joining the southern and northern halves. In July 2018, the village was evacuated as an iceberg weighing over 10 million tonnes, and towering over 90 m (300 ft) was headed for the settlement.

== Demographics and economy ==
The settlement which had a population of 30 residents in 1950, was home to 72 inhabitants by 1977, and 166 inhabitants in 2017. The population reside in 25 houses in a single residential zone. The economy is dependent on fishing, especially the Greenland halibut, and hunting of seals and whales, which accounted for about 41% of the income in 2001. The settlement has a port that is used for trading and boat services. There is a helistop located north of the settlement. Ferries, dog sledges, and snowmobiles are used for transport. There is a single road that connects the central residential area with the helipad. The town infrastructure includes a diesel power plant, storage house, service house, chapel, and school.
