= Uilortussoq Island =

Island in Avannaata, Greenland

Coordinates: 72°47′N 54°45′W

Uilortussoq Island is an island of Greenland. It is located in Baffin Bay in the Upernavik Archipelago, in the Avannaata municipality in western Greenland, 1,000 km north of the capital Nuuk.

The average annual temperature in the area is −8 °C . The warmest month is July, when the average temperature is 12 °C, and the coldest is January, with −20 °C.
