= Upernavik Archipelago =

Coastal archipelago in Greenland

- Location within Greenland

Geography
- Location: Baffin Bay, Greenland
- Coordinates: 73°20′N 56°10′W
- Archipelago: Upernavik Archipelago
- Major islands: Nutaarmiut, Maniitsoq, Qeqertaq
- Length: 350 km (217 mi)
- Width: 55 km (34.2 mi)

Administration
- Greenland
- Municipality: Avannaata

Demographics
- Population: (see below)

Upernavik Archipelago is a vast coastal archipelago in the Avannaata municipality in northwestern Greenland, off the shores of northeastern Baffin Bay. The archipelago extends from the northwestern coast of Sigguup Nunaa peninsula in the south at approximately 71°50′N 56°00′W to the southern end of Melville Bay (Greenlandic: Qimusseriarsuaq) in the north at approximately 74°50′N 57°30′W.

== History ==
The archipelago belongs to the earliest-settled areas of Greenland, the first migrants arriving approximately 2,000 BCE. All southbound migrations of the Inuit passed through the area, leaving behind a trail of archeological sites. The early Saqqaq culture diminished in importance around 1,000 BCE, followed by the migrants of Dorset culture, who spread alongside the coast of Baffin Bay, being in turn displaced by the Thule people in the 13th and 14th centuries. The area has been continuously inhabited since then.

Today the Upernavik Archipelago is sparsely populated, despite the relatively high number of settlements scattered across its entire length. All but one of these settlements are located on the islands. Upernavik town is the largest settlement with 1,129 inhabitants as of 2010, formally founded in 1772 by the Danes during the colonization era.

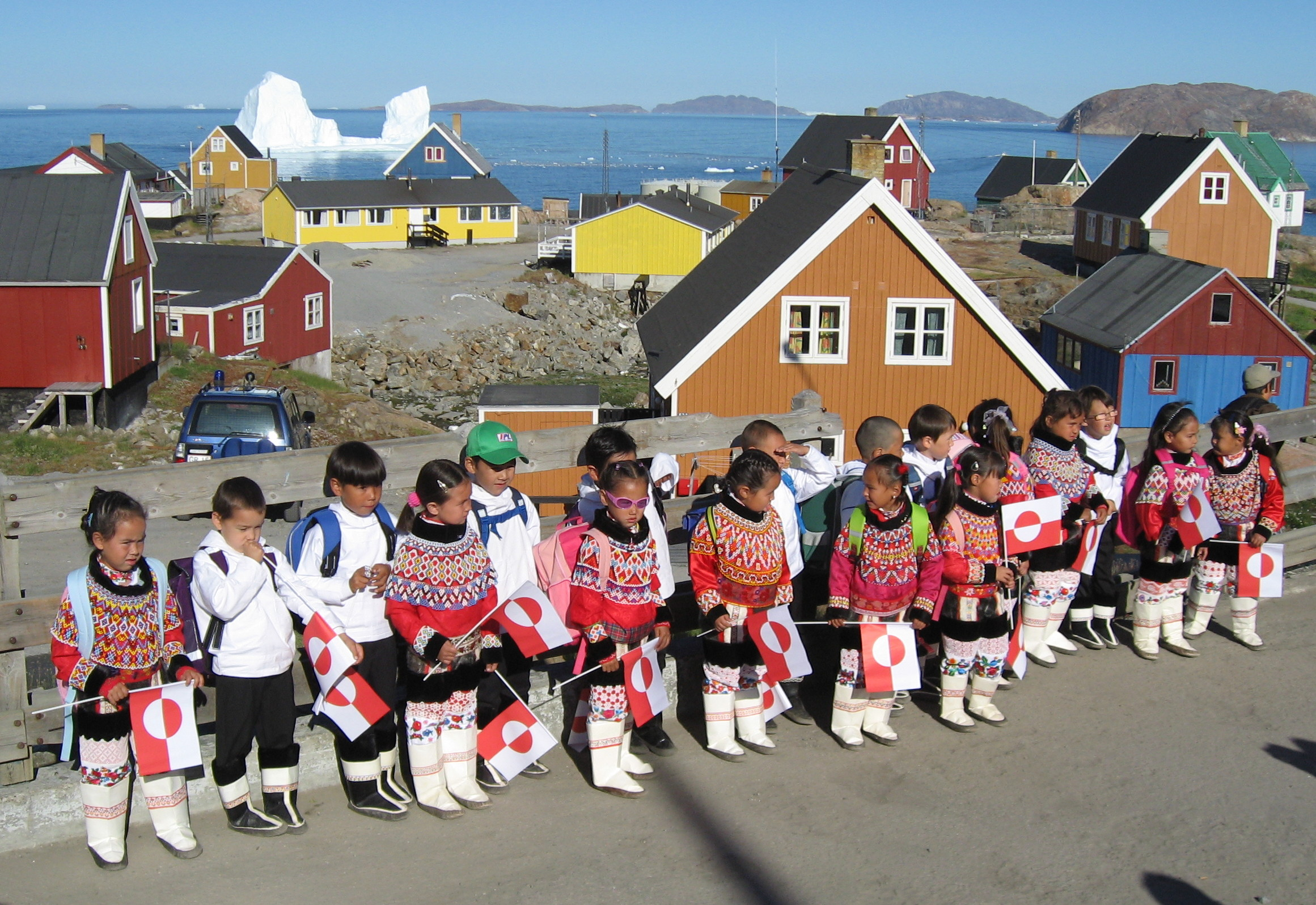
Children of Upernavik town on their first day in class

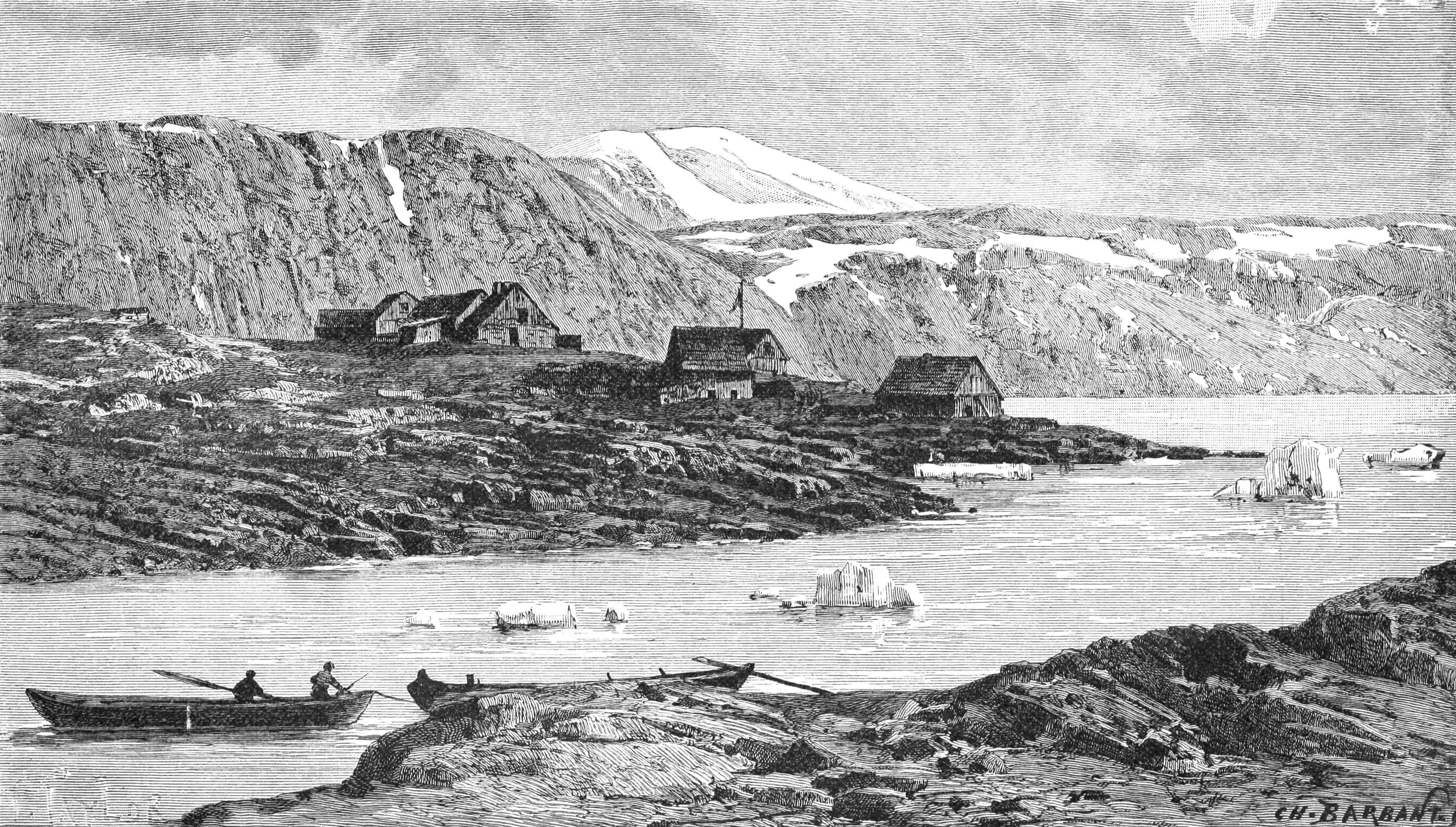
View of Upernavik in 1890

== Geography ==
The coastline of Greenland is deeply indented in this region, markedly different from that of the Nuussuaq Basin of Uummannaq Fjord and Nuussuaq Peninsula. In the northern part of the archipelago, the coastal mountains disappear altogether, with the Greenland ice sheet (Greenlandic: Sermersuaq) reaching the sea level across nearly the entire length of the perennially frozen Melville Bay.

=== Islands ===
Nutaarmiut Island is the largest in the archipelago, followed by Maniitsoq and Qeqertaq. These are some of the islands of the group:

Aappilattoq (Upernavik Icefjord) • Aappilattoq (Tasiusaq Bay) • Akia • Akuliaruseq • Amarortalik • Amitsorsuaq • Anarusuk • Apparsuit • Atilissuaq • Aukarnersuaq • Ateqanngitsorsuaq • Horse Head • Ikerasakassak • Ikermoissuaq • Ikermiut • Illunnguit • Innaarsuit • Inussullissuaq • Iperaq • Itissaalik • Kangaarsuk • Karrat • Kiatassuaq • Kiataussaq • Kingittorsuaq • Kullorsuaq • Maniitsoq • Mattaangassut • Mernoq • Naajaat • Nako • Nasaussaq • Nuluuk • Nunaa • Nunatarsuaq • Nutaarmiut • Nutaarmiut (Tasiusaq Bay) • Nuuluk • Paagussat • Paornivik • Puugutaa • Qaarsorsuaq • Qaarsorsuatsiaq • Qallunaat • Qaneq • Qaqaarissorsuaq • Qasse • Qeqertaq • Qeqertarsuaq (Kangerlussuaq Icefjord) • Qeqertarsuaq (Nasaussap Saqqaa) • Qeqertarsuaq (Upernavik Icefjord) • Qullikorsuit • Saarlia • Saattoq • Saattorsuaq • Saattup Akia • Sanningassoq • Saqqarlersuaq • Singarnaq-Annertussoq • Sisuarsuit • Sugar Loaf • Taartoq • Tasiusaq • Timilersua • Tukingassoq • Tussaaq • Tuttorqortooq • Uigorlersuaq • Uilortussoq • Upernavik

=== Settlements ===
Geography of the Upernavik Archipelago, with marked settlement locations

From north to south, the following are the towns and villages in the archipelago:

| Settlement | Lat. N | Long. W | Area km^{2} | Pop. 2020 | Notes |
|---|---|---|---|---|---|
| Kullorsuaq | 74°34′45″ | 57°13′05″ | 3.36 | 453 | The northernmost and the second-largest settlement |
| Nuussuaq | 74°06′40″ | 57°03′40″ | ... | 181 | The only settlement on the mainland |
| Nutaarmiut | 73°31′08″ | 56°25′35″ | 1.51 | 43 | The smallest settlement |
| Tasiusaq | 73°22′08″ | 56°03′20″ | 73.65 | 252 | |
| Innaarsuit | 73°12′00″ | 56°00′40″ | ... | 180 | |
| Naajaat | 73°08′35″ | 55°48′25″ | 1.27 | 49 | |
| Aappilattoq | 72°53′00″ | 55°36′00″ | 39.53 | 149 | |
| Upernavik | 72°47′13″ | 56°08′50″ | 2.42 | 1092 | The only town of any size and a cultural center; host to the only airport in the area |
| Kangersuatsiaq | 72°22′47″ | 55°33′00″ | 1.44 | 130 | |
| Upernavik Kujalleq | 72°09′16″ | 55°31′29″ | 250.03 | 201 | The southernmost settlement, located on Qeqertaq, the largest inhabited island |

== Panoramic views ==
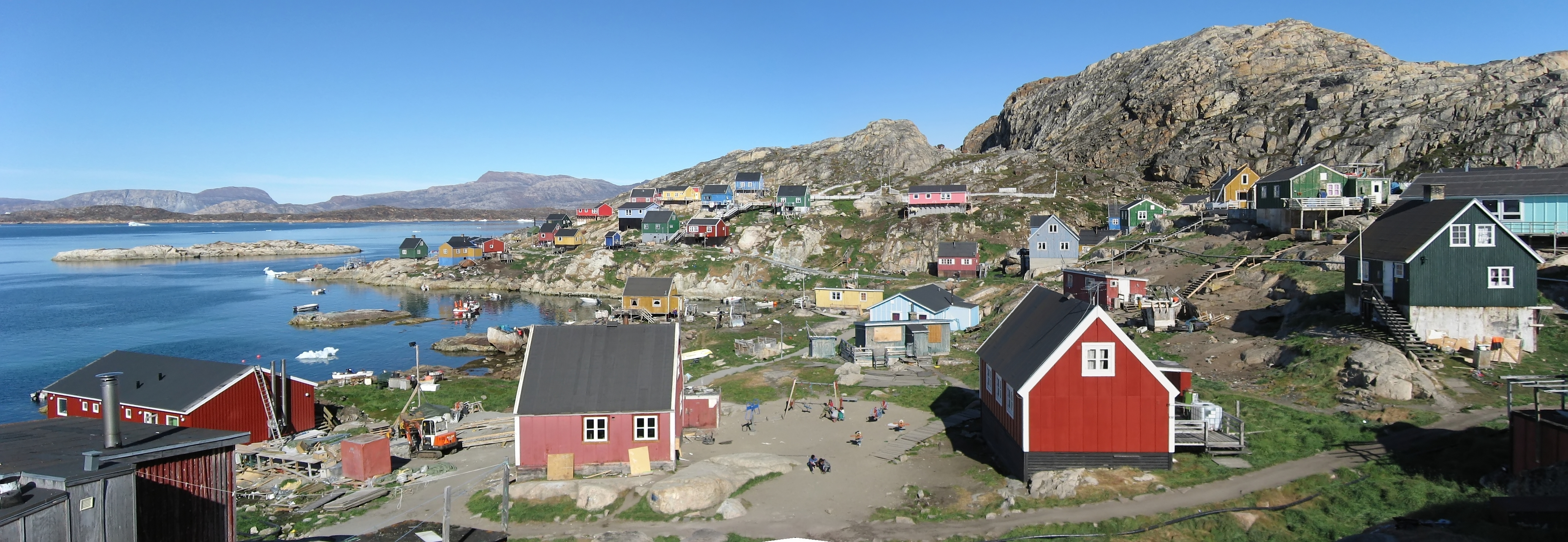
Aappilattoq, one of several island settlements in the archipelago

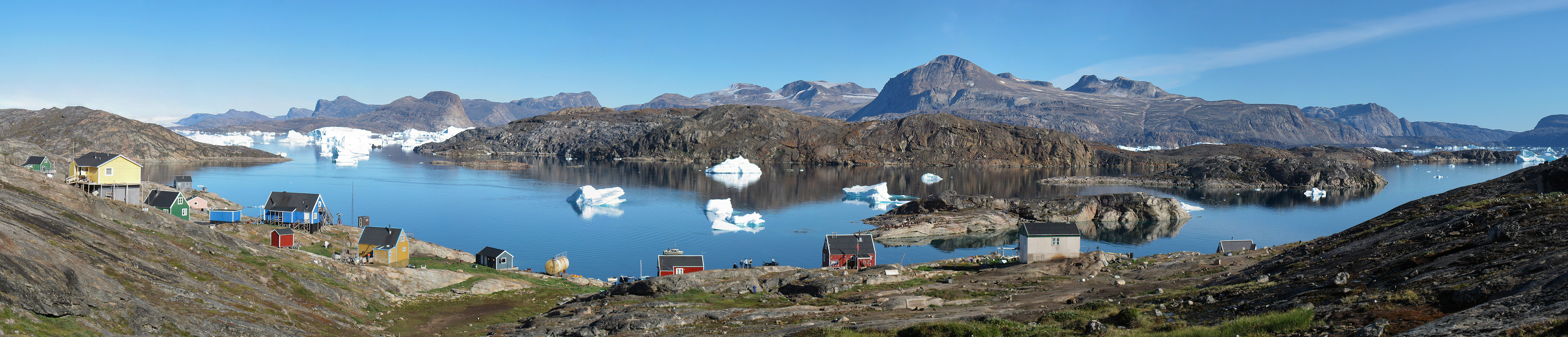
Panorama of Naajaat, the second-smallest settlement

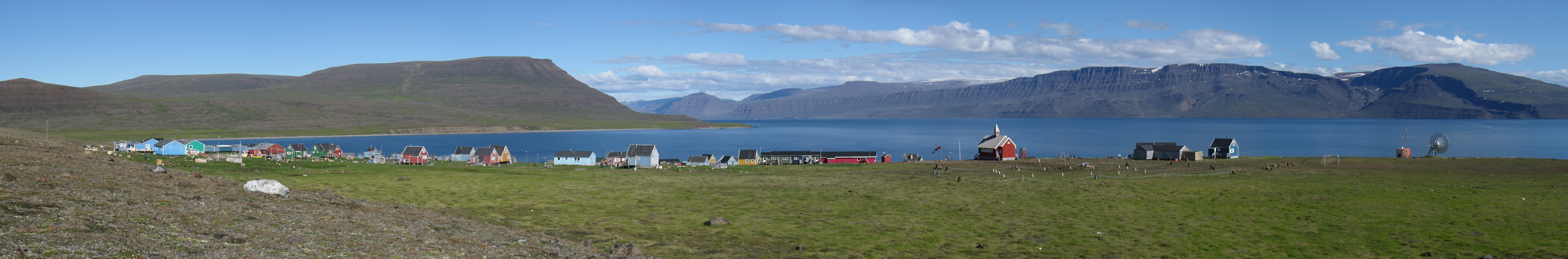
Upernavik Kujalleq is the southernmost settlement.

== Economy ==
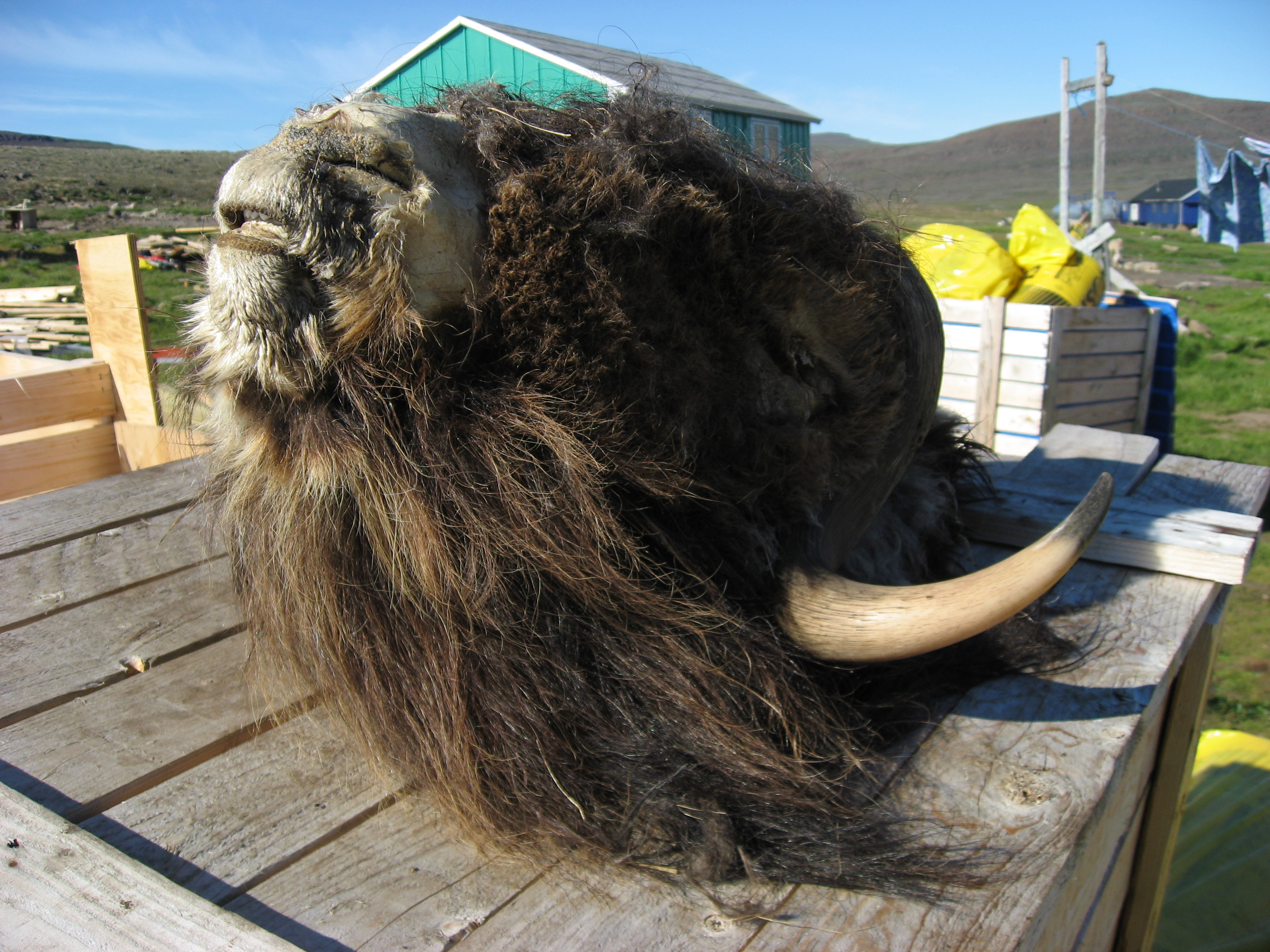
Muskox head on display in Upernavik Kujalleq

Fishing is the mainstay of the area, although the more northern settlements still rely on traditional hunting of fur seals, walruses, and whales to supplement the family economy. In that, the northern region is culturally linked with the far north of Greenland, the Qaanaaq region.

Outside of Upernavik town, the average level of income is amongst the lowest in Greenland. Four of the settlements in the archipelago (Naajaat, Nuussuaq, Kullorsuaq, and Upernavik Kujalleq) are listed in the top 10 poorest within Greenland.

== Transport ==
=== Air ===
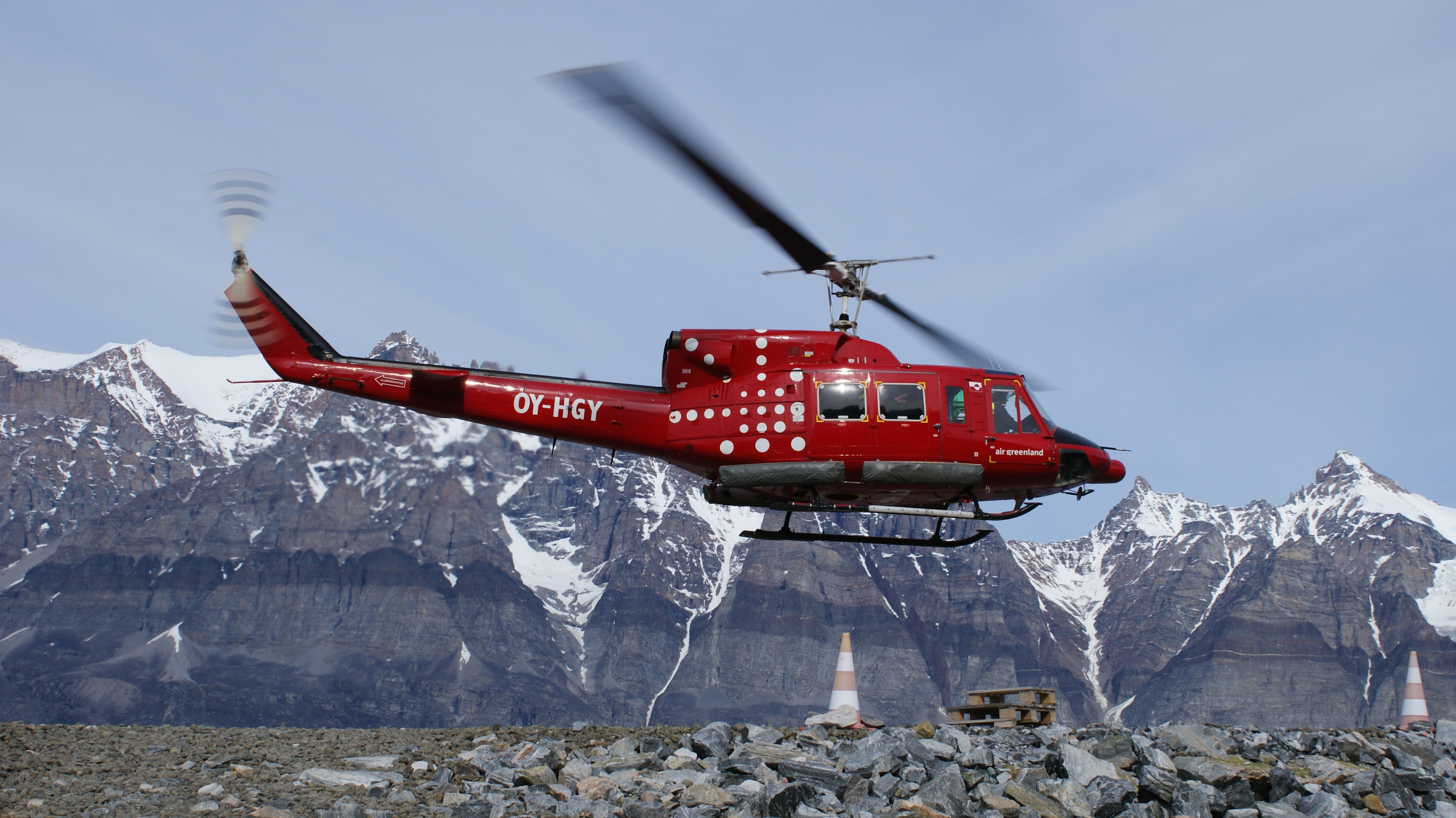
Air Greenland services the settlements with a Bell 212 helicopter.

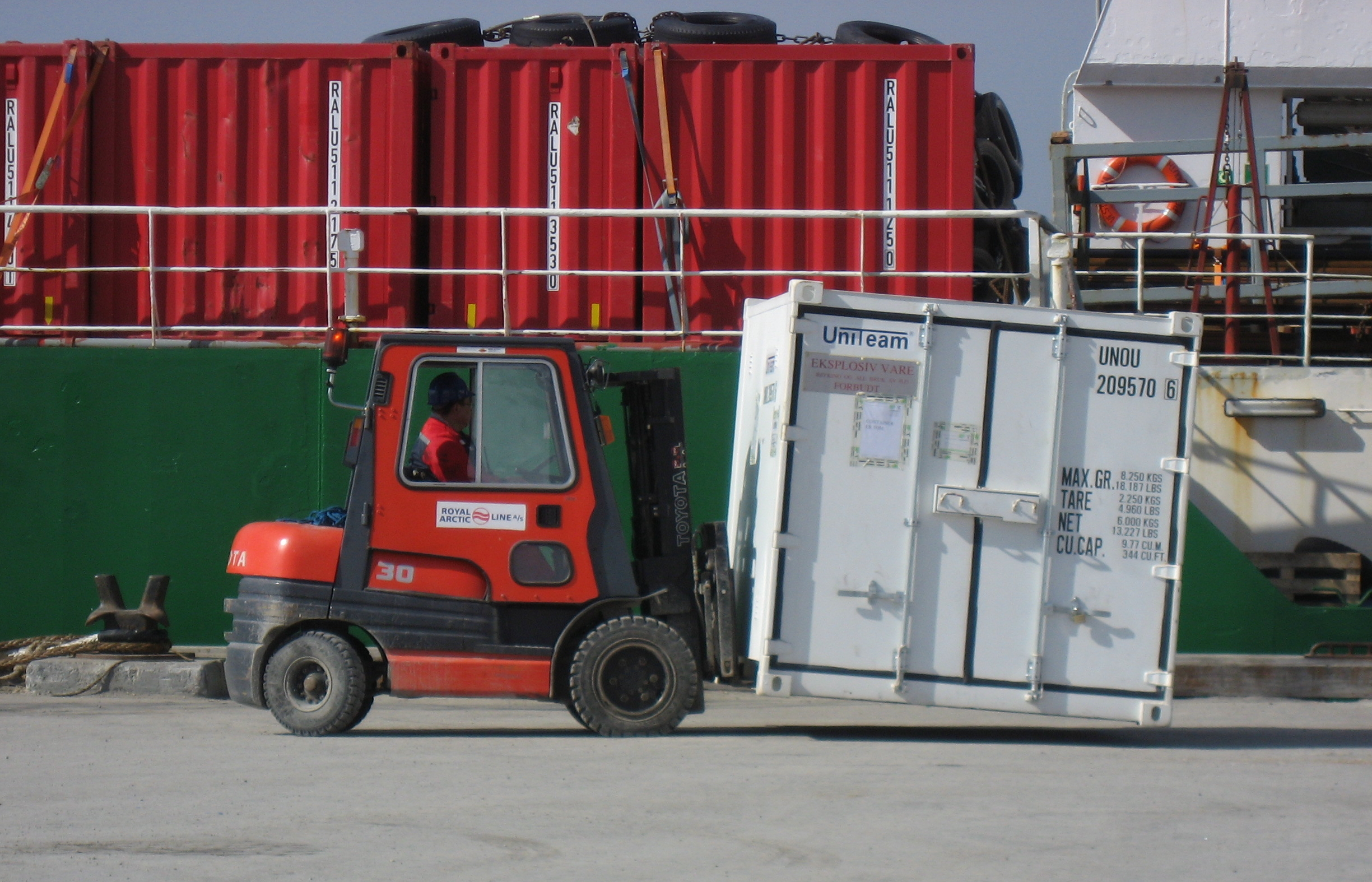
The supply ship Vestlandia of Royal Arctic Line is the lifeline link for the archipelago.

Air Greenland operates government contract flights to nearly all villages in the Upernavik archipelago. These mostly cargo flights are not featured in the timetable of the airline, although they can be pre-booked. Departure times for these flights as specified during booking are by definition approximate, with the settlement service optimized on the fly depending on local demand for a given day. Upernavik is the only settlement with an airport.

| Settlement | Aerodrome | Destinations |
|---|---|---|
| Aappilattoq | Aappilattoq Heliport | Upernavik |
| Innaarsuit | Innaarsuit Heliport | Tasiusaq, Upernavik |
| Kangersuatsiaq | Kangersuatsiaq Heliport | Upernavik, Upernavik Kujalleq |
| Kullorsuaq | Kullorsuaq Heliport | Nuussuaq, Upernavik |
| Nuussuaq | Nuussuaq Heliport | Kullorsuaq, Upernavik |
| Tasiusaq | Tasiusaq Heliport | Innaarsuit, Upernavik |
| Upernavik | Upernavik Airport | Aappilattoq, Ilulissat, Innaarsuit, Kangersuatsiaq, Kullorsuaq, Nuussuaq, Qaanaaq, Qaarsut, Tasiusaq, Upernavik Kujalleq |
| Upernavik Kujalleq | Upernavik Kujalleq Heliport | Kangersuatsiaq, Upernavik |

=== Sea ===
Until 2006, Arctic Umiaq Line had provided ferry services from Upernavik to Nuuk, calling at Uummannaq, Ilulissat, and Aasiaat within the Avannaata and Qeqertalik municipalities. M/S Sarpik Ittuk—which serviced Disko Bay, Uummannaq Fjord and Upernavik—was sold in 2006 to Nova Cruising, a company from the Bahamas. Since then the ferry services of AUL are available only southwards from Ilulissat, operated with the remaining ship, M/S Sarfaq Ittuk.

Cargo/passenger boat Vestlandia of Royal Arctic Line links Upernavik with Uummannaq. Tourism is very undeveloped, but charter boats for individual travellers and small groups are available in all settlements.
