= Upernavik Kujalleq =

Upernavik Kujalleq Søndre Upernavik
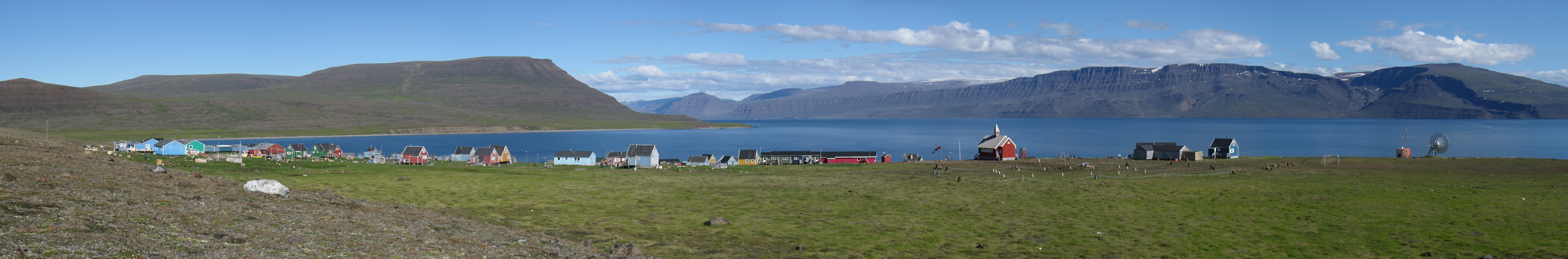
- Upernavik Kujalleq

- Location within Greenland
- Coordinates: 72°09′16″N 55°31′29″W
- State: Kingdom of Denmark
- Constituent country: Greenland
- Municipality: Avannaata
- Founded: 1855

Population (2020)
  - Total: 201
- Time zone: UTC−02:00 (Western Greenland Time)
  - Summer (DST): UTC−01:00 (Western Greenland Summer Time)
- Postal code: 3962 Upernavik

Upernavik Kujalleq (old spelling: Upernavik Kujatdleq), formerly Søndre Upernavik, is an island settlement in Avannaata municipality in northwestern Greenland. Founded in 1855 as a trading station on Qeqertaq Island, the settlement had 201 inhabitants in 2020.

== Upernavik Archipelago ==
Upernavik Kujalleq within the Upernavik Archipelago

Upernavik Kujalleq is the only settlement on Qeqertaq Island, which is the second largest island of Upernavik Archipelago, a vast archipelago of small islands on the coast of northeastern Baffin Bay. It is located near Qugdlungut, the southernmost point of the island, and features a heliport,

== Transport ==
On weekdays, Air Greenland serves the village as part of government contract, with mostly cargo helicopter flights from Upernavik Kujalleq Heliport to Kangersuatsiaq and Upernavik.

== Population ==
The population of Upernavik Kujalleq has remained relatively stable over the last two decades.

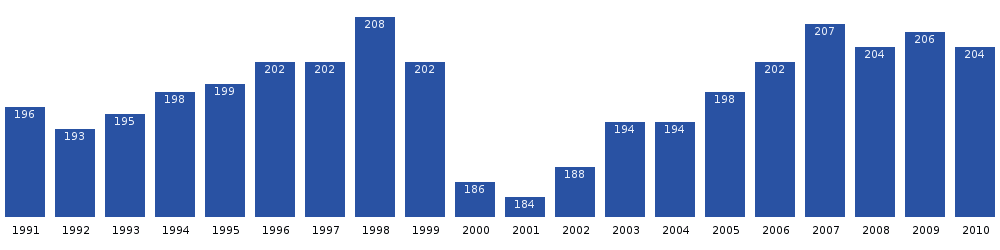
Upernavik Kujalleq population growth dynamics in the last two decades. Source: Statistics Greenland
