= Nunatakassak =

Nunatak in Avannaata, Greenland

Coordinates: 74°40′N 56°37′W

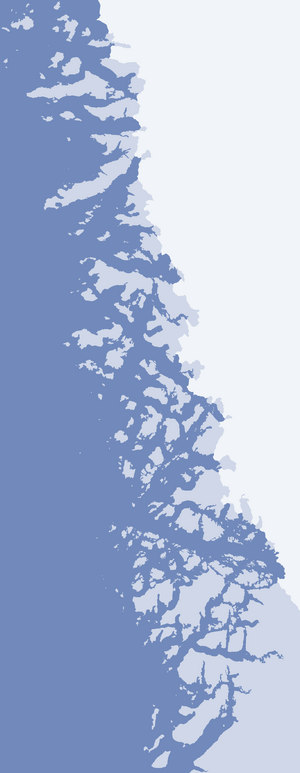
Nunatakassak (Upernavik Archipelago)

Nunatakassak (old spelling: Nunatakavsak) is a nunatak (Greenlandic: nunataq) in Avannaata municipality in northwestern Greenland. It is one of several nunataks in the Melville Bay region of Greenland, where the Greenland ice sheet (Greenlandic: Sermersuaq) drains into the bay alongside its entire length apart from an occasional nunatak.

== Geography ==
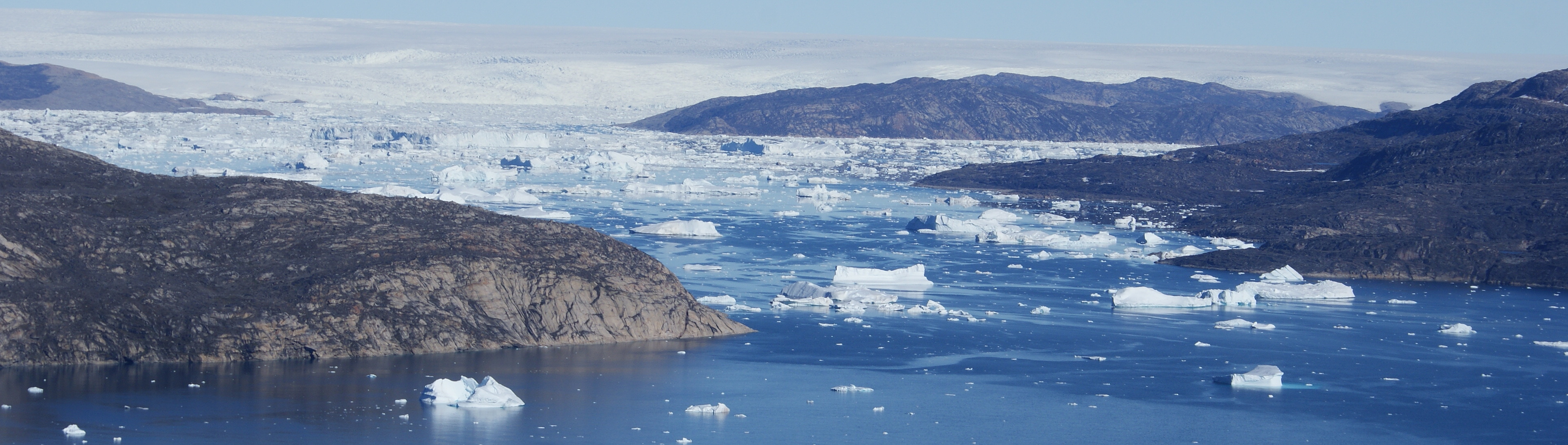
Aerial view of Nunatakassak and the Ikerasaa strait between the Kullorsuaq and Saqqarlersuaq islands.

Nunatakassak is located on the mainland of Greenland in the northernmost part of Upernavik Archipelago. To the south, Greenland icesheet drains into Melville Bay via Nunatakassaup Sermia glacier separating it from Wandel Land, another nunatak. To the northwest lies the Nunatarsuaq nunatak, possibly isolated as a new island, with OpenStreetMap maps, and the satellite photographs of Google Maps showing the nunatak as already isolated, with fast sea-ice in place of the retreated icesheet.
