= Devil's Thumb =

Devil's Thumb may refer to the following mountains or landmarks:

- Devils Thumb, a mountain on the Alaska–British Columbia border
- Devils Thumb (Antarctica), a mountain near Granite Harbour, Antarctica
- Devils Thumb (Washington), a mountain in the Cascade Range in Washington state
- Devil's Thumb (Greenland), a mountain on Kullorsuaq Island in northwestern Greenland
- Devil's Thumb (Hot Spring), an inert hot spring in Mammoth Hot Springs, Yellowstone National Park
- Devil's Thumb (California), a prominent rock outcrop in the American River (middle Fork) canyon, California
- Devil's Thumb (Queensland), a prominent rocky outcrop in Far North Queensland, Australia
