= Nuussuup Nuua =

Headland in Avannaata, Greenland

Coordinates: 74°05′37″N 57°16′52″W

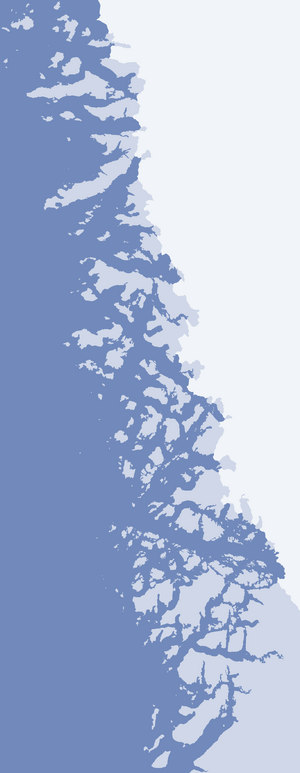
Nuussuup Nuua (Upernavik Archipelago)

Nuussuup Nuua (old spelling: Nûgssûp Nûa) is a cape in Avannaata municipality in northwestern Greenland.

== Geography ==
The cape is the western promontory on the 52 km (32 mi) long Nuussuaq Peninsula, jutting from the mainland of Greenland into Baffin Bay and separating Sugar Loaf Bay in the south from Inussulik Bay in the north. It is located approximately 6.8 km (4.2 mi) west-south-west of the Nuussuaq settlement,

The cape is an alternative endpoint for Melville Bay, although the common definition limits the bay to Wilcox Head, the western promontory on Kiatassuaq Island, at the northern end of Inussulik Bay, thus excluding the latter. The other end is defined as Cape York, 331 km (206 mi) to the northwest, in northern Baffin Bay.
