= Inussulik Bay =

Bay in Avannaata, Greenland

Coordinates: 74°15′N 57°00′W

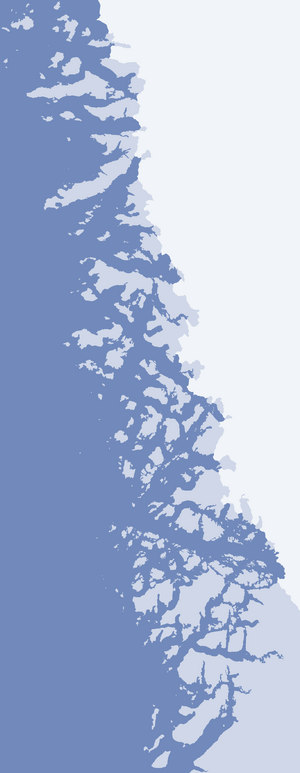
Inussulik Bay (Upernavik Archipelago)

Inussulik Bay (Greenlandic: Inussullip Imaa, old spelling: Inugsugdlip Imâ) is a bay in the Upernavik Archipelago in Avannaata municipality in northwestern Greenland.

== Geography ==
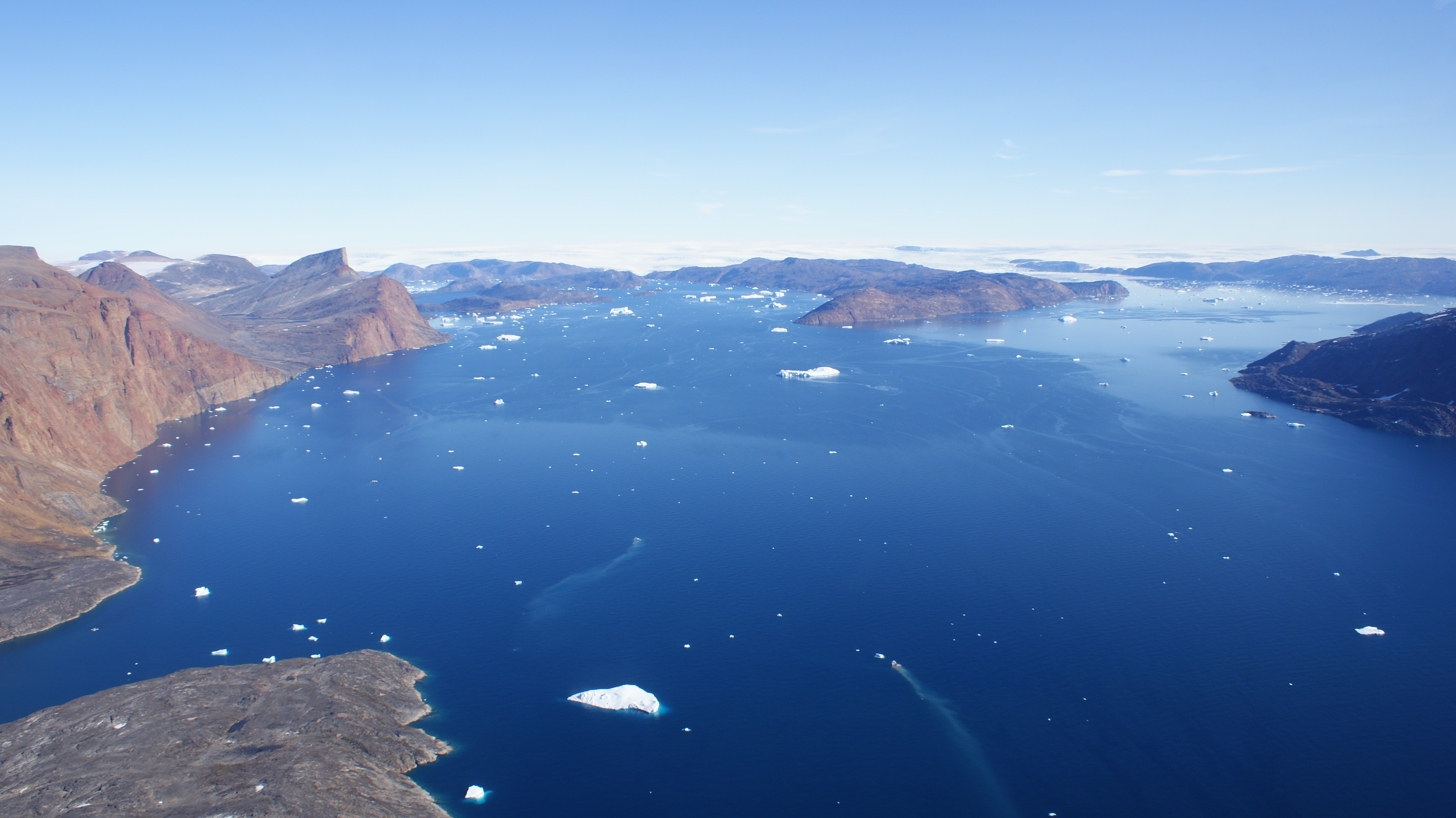
Aerial view of the northern part of the bay, with Kiatassuaq Island on the left and Inussullissuaq Island on the right.

The bay is located in the northern part of Upernavik Archipelago, between Kiatassuaq Island in the north and Nuussuaq Peninsula in the south. It is an arch-shaped indentation of Baffin Bay, sometimes included as part of Melville Bay, although commonly the southern limit of latter is defined as Wilcox Head, the western cape of Kiatassuaq Island.

At its widest − from the Wilcox Head promontory on Kiatassuaq Island to the Tinumanersuaq cape on Nuussuaq Peninsula − Inussulik Bay stretches for 43.12 km (26.79 mi). The length of the bay reaches its maximum of 40.6 km (25.2 mi) at the point where the Greenland ice sheet (Greenlandic: Sermersuaq) drains into the bay via the Illullip Sermia glacier.

=== Islands ===
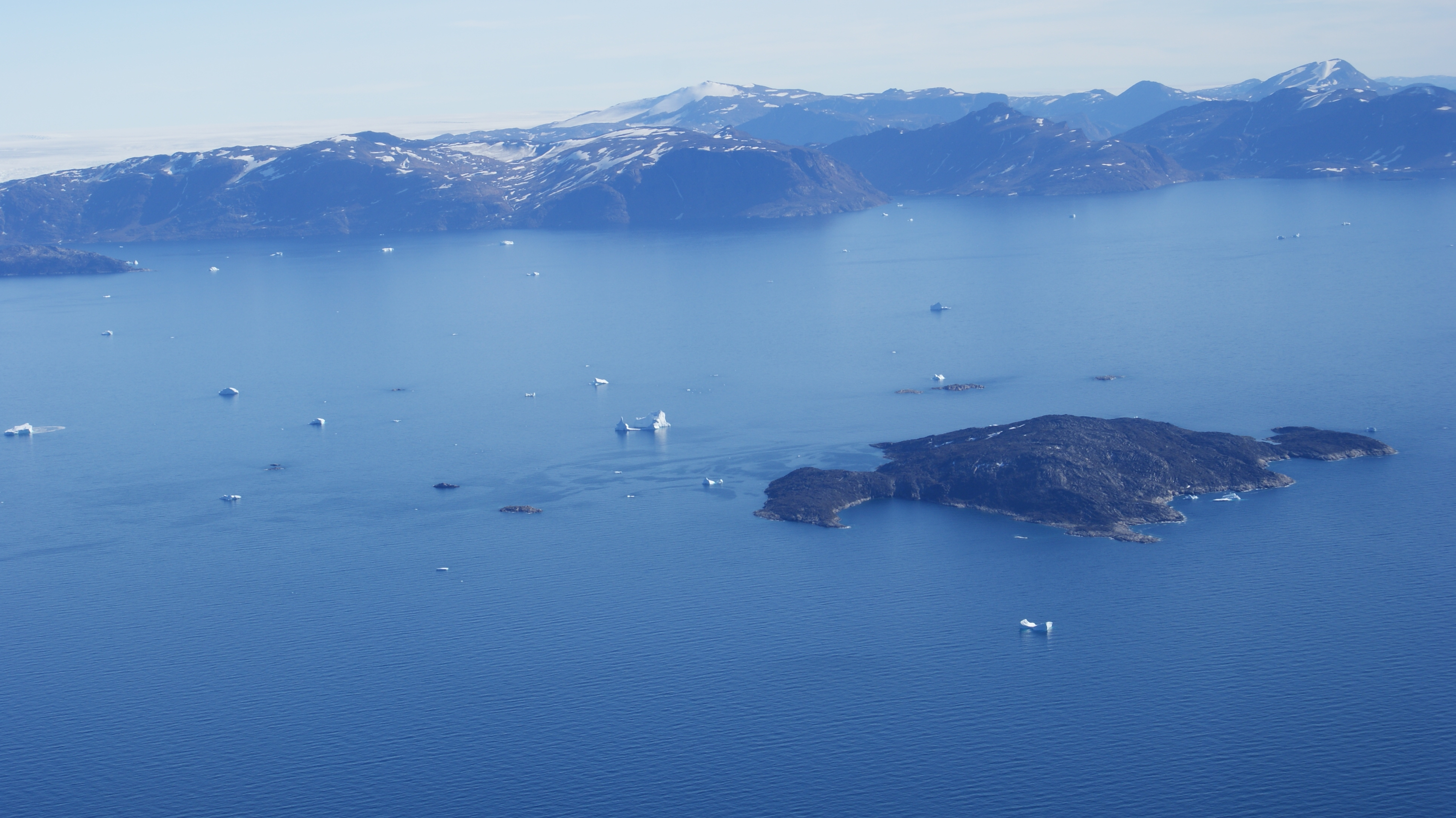
Aerial view of the southern part of the bay, with Ikermiut island in the foreground, and Nuussuaq Peninsula in the background.

Kiatassuaq Island is the largest island in the bay, forming its northern boundary. Unlike the neighboring Melville Bay in the north and Sugar Loaf Bay in the south, Inussulik Bay has few islands. There are only five small islands, all uninhabited, as well as several skerries in the eastern part.

The main island is the 6.3 km × 1.9 km (3.9 mi × 1.2 mi) Inussullissuaq Island in the north. In 1930 the island briefly served as a polar station for Knud Rasmussen, the Greenlandic polar explorer and anthropologist. The station was named Bjørne Borg (or Bjørneborg, a bear castle). Its ruins can still be found on the island.

The other islands are Inussulik immediately to the west of Inussullissuaq Island, Qeqertarsuaq immediately to the east, Ikermiut Island in the center of the bay, and Illoorfik Island near the coast of Nuussuaq Peninsula.

=== Peninsulas ===
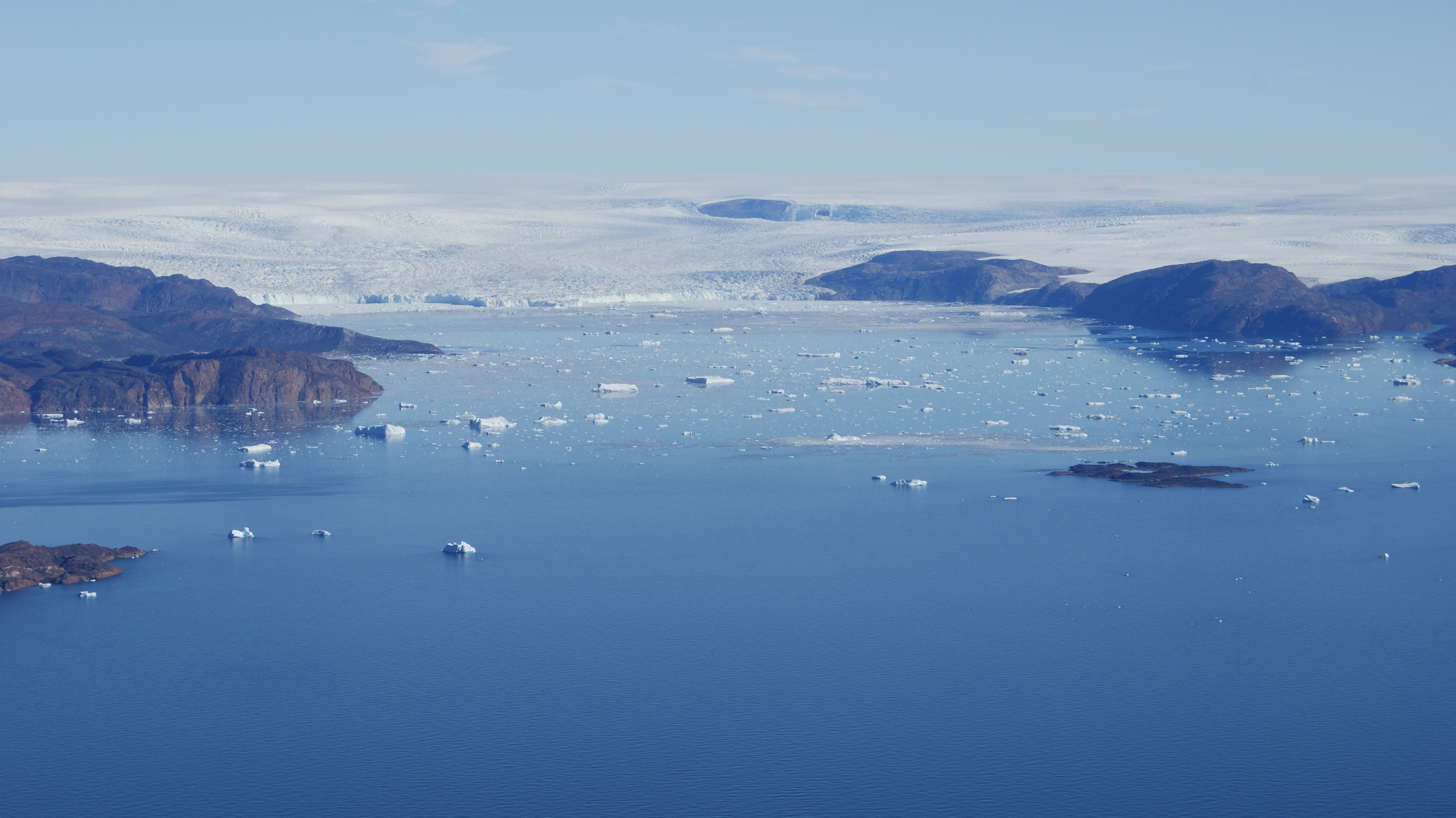
Aerial view of the inner, eastern part of the bay, with the Illullip Sermia glacier draining the icesheet into the bay.

Nuussuaq Peninsula defines the southern and southeastern limit of Inussulik Bay. Two other peninsulas of mainland Greenland extend into the bay: Sanningassorsuaq Peninsula and Illulissuaq Peninsula, bracing the small inlet at the far end of the bay from the north and south, respectively. The farthest inlet of the bay is choked with icebergs calving off the Illullip Sermia glacier.

=== Waterways ===
Kangerluarsuk Fjord is the main inlet of Inussulik Bay in the south; one of several of that name in Greenland. It separates the Illulissuaq Peninsula in the north from the main arm of Nuussuaq Peninsula in the south; with both peninsulas sharing the root, a nunatak on the edge of the icesheet.

In the northeast, Ikerasaa Strait separates Sanningassorsuaq Peninsula from Kiatassuaq Island and the small Milissua Island, connecting through a small channel to the Alison Bay in the north.

== Settlement ==
The coasts and islands of Inussulik Bay are uninhabited. The closest settlements are Kullorsuaq in the north, and Nuussuaq in the south. The bay is used as an inner waterway linking the settlements, offering partial shelter from the open waters of Baffin Bay for fishermen and hunters.
