= Wandel =

Wandel may refer to:

== Places ==
- Wandel Sea, Arctic Ocean
- Wandel Land, Greenland
- Wandel Peak, Booth Island, Antarctica
- Lamington, South Lanarkshire, Scotland

== Other uses ==
- Wandel, an Austrian political party founded in 2012

== People with the surname ==
- Bernie Wandel, American musician
- Carl Frederik Wandel (1843–1930), Danish polar explorer and hydrographer
- Elisabeth Wandel (1850–1926), Danish painter
- Hubertus Wandel (1926–2019), German architect
- Joachim Wandel (1914–1942), German pilot
- Martin Wandel (1892–1943), German general
- Momo Wandel Soumah (died 2003), Guinean singer
- Sigurd Wandel (1875–1947), Danish painter
