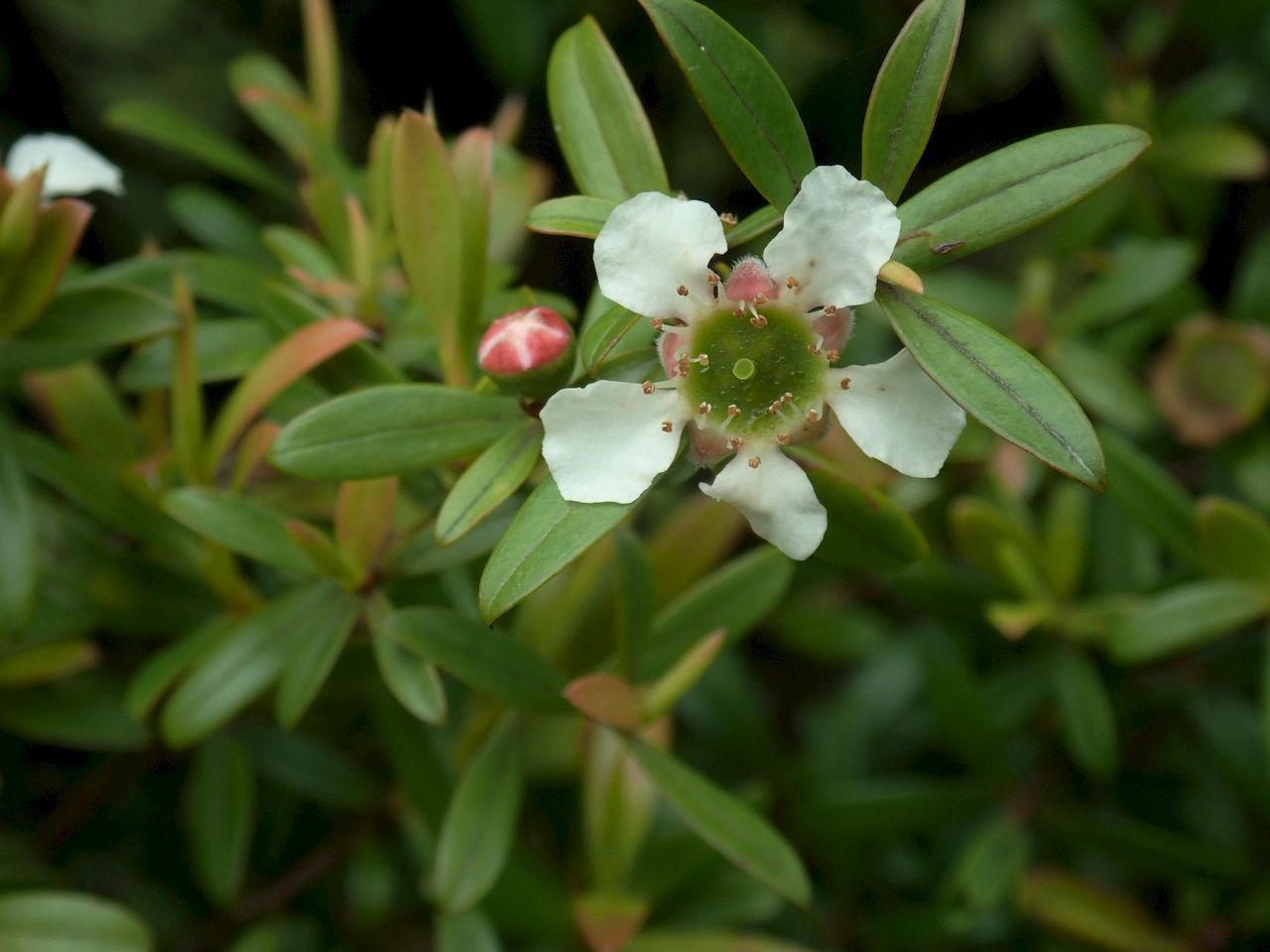

Scientific classification
- Kingdom: Plantae
- Clade: Tracheophytes
- Clade: Angiosperms
- Clade: Eudicots
- Clade: Rosids
- Order: Myrtales
- Family: Myrtaceae
- Genus: Leptospermum
- Species: L. wooroonooran

Binomial name
- Leptospermum wooroonooran F.M.Bailey

= Leptospermum wooroonooran =

Species of tree

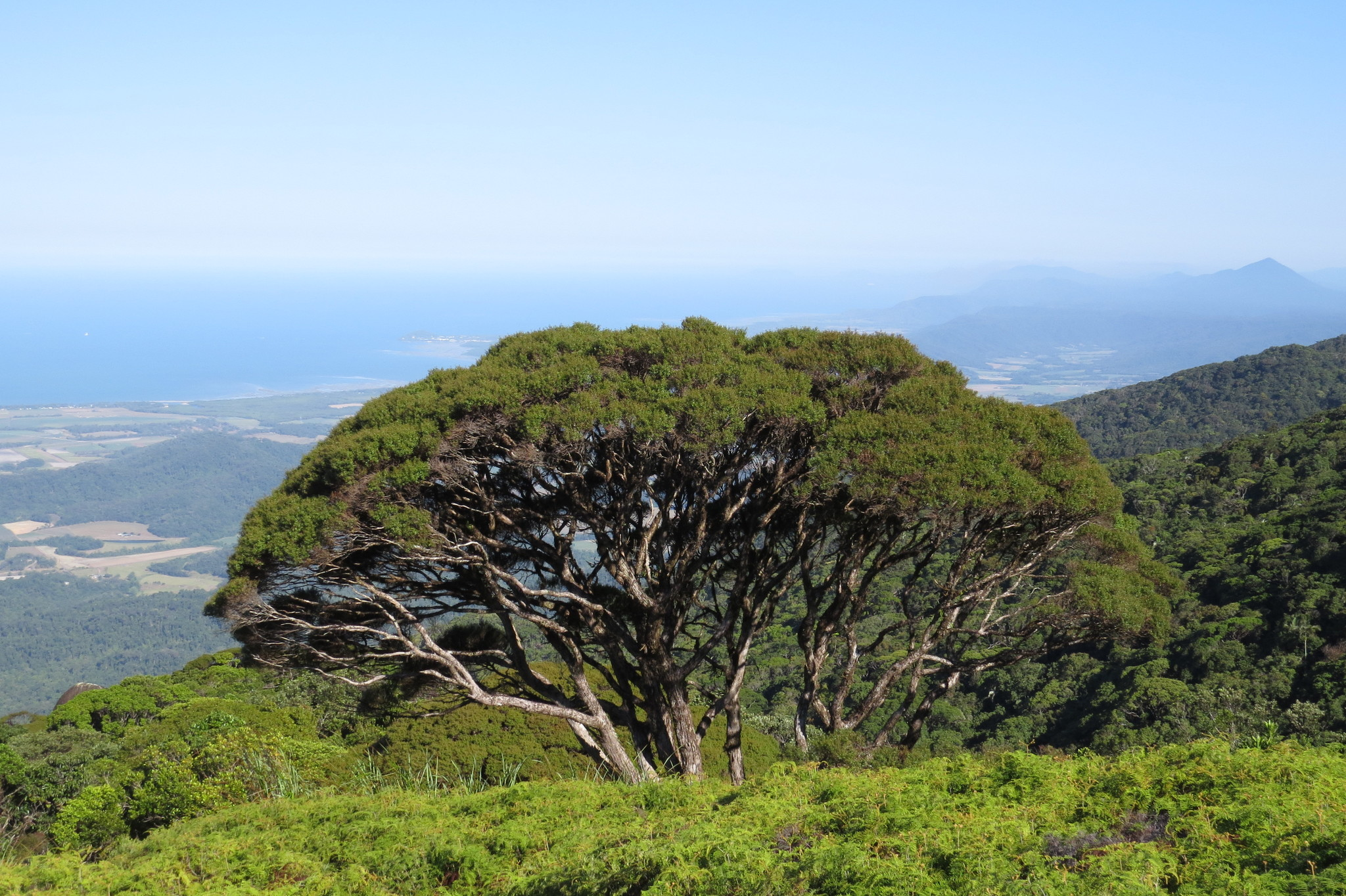
Habit near the Devil's Thumb

Leptospermum wooroonooran, commonly known as wurunuru or mountain teatree, is a species of stunted tree that is endemic to Queensland where it grows on exposed mountain ridges. It has thin, fibrous or flaky bark, lance-shaped leaves with the narrower end towards the base, white flowers arranged singly on short side shoots and fruit remain on the plant at maturity.

== Description ==
Leptospermum wooroonooran is a stunted, sometimes prostrate tree that typically grows to a height of 1–6 m (3 ft 3 in – 19 ft 8 in). It has thin, rough, fibrous or flaky bark, the young stems silky hairy at first with a broad flange near the leaf base. The leaves are lance-shaped with the narrower end towards the base, 15–20 mm (0.59–0.79 in) long and 3–7 mm (0.12–0.28 in) wide and strongly-scented when crushed. The flowers are white, 12–20 mm (0.47–0.79 in) in diameter and arranged singly on short side shoots. The flower buds have thin, papery, reddish brown bracts at the base but that fall before the flower opens. The floral cup is glabrous,3.5–4.5 mm (0.14–0.18 in) long and the sepals are broadly egg-shaped, about 2 mm (0.079 in) long. The petals are 4–6 mm (0.16–0.24 in) long and the stamens 1.5–2 mm (0.059–0.079 in) or more long. Flowering mainly in November and the fruit is a capsule 4–5 m (13–16 ft) wide that remains on the plant at maturity.

== Taxonomy and naming ==
Leptospermum wooroonooran was first formally described in 1889 by Frederick Manson Bailey in Archibald Meston's report to the Queensland Government on his Government Scientific Expedition to the Bellenden-Ker Range (Woonooroonan).

== Distribution and habitat ==
Wurunuru grows on windswept ridges on the mountains north-west of Mossman, in the Mount Spurgeon-Mount Lewis area and in the Bellenden Ker Range in north Queensland.

== Use in horticulture ==
This teatree is sometimes grown in gardens, is suitable for heavy shade and is frost hardy but requires cool, moist conditions.
