= Nunatarsuaq =

Nunatak in Avannaata, Greenland

Coordinates: 74°43′N 56°58′W

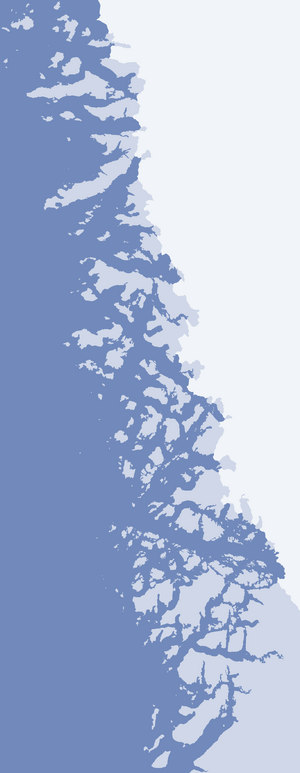
Nunatarsuaq (Upernavik Archipelago)

Nunatarsuaq (old spelling: Nunatarssuaq, Danish: Hovgård Kystland) is a nunatak (Greenlandic: nunataq) in Avannaata municipality in northwestern Greenland.

== Geography ==
Nunatarsuaq is one of several nunataks in the Melville Bay region of Greenland, where the Greenland ice sheet (Greenlandic: Sermersuaq) drains into the bay alongside its entire length apart from an occasional nunatak. Nunatarsuaq is located on the mainland of Greenland in the northernmost part of Upernavik Archipelago. To the north and east, Greenland icesheet drains into Melville Bay via unnamed, low-altitude glaciers.

=== Isolation as an island ===
In the event of glacial retreat, the nunatak will be isolated as an island. Unlike the available maps of Melville Bay, OpenStreetMap maps, and the satellite photographs of Google Maps show the nunatak as already isolated, with fast sea-ice in place of the retreated icesheet.

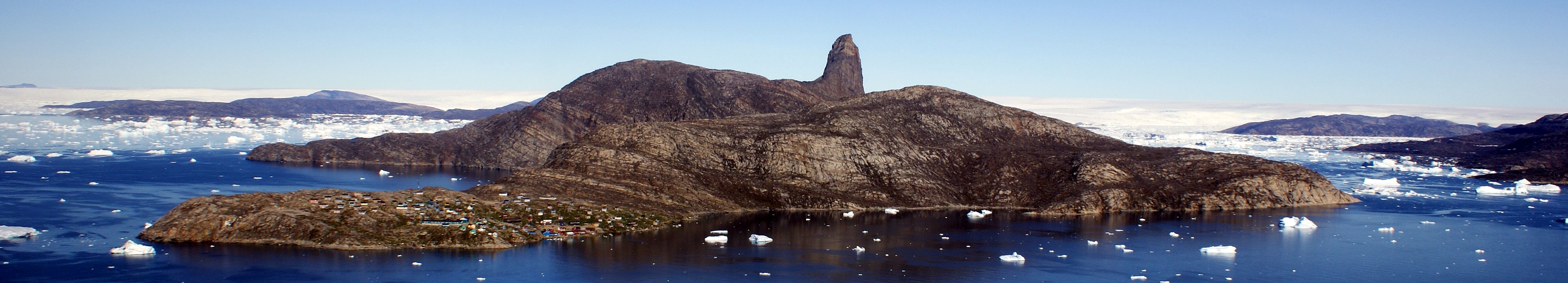
View of Kullorsuaq Island (center), Nunatarsuaq (behind, left) and Nunatakassak (behind, right).
