= Nunatarsuaq (disambiguation) =

Nunatarsuaq may refer to the following nunataks in Greenland:

- Nunatarsuaq, a nunatak on the coast of Melville Bay in northwestern Greenland
- Nunatarsuaq (Tasiusaq Bay), a nunatak on the coast of Tasiusaq Bay in northwestern Greenland
- Nunatarsuaq (Inglefield Fjord), a nunatak at the head of the Inglefield Fjord in northwestern Greenland
