= Devil's Thumb (Greenland) =

Mountain in Greenland

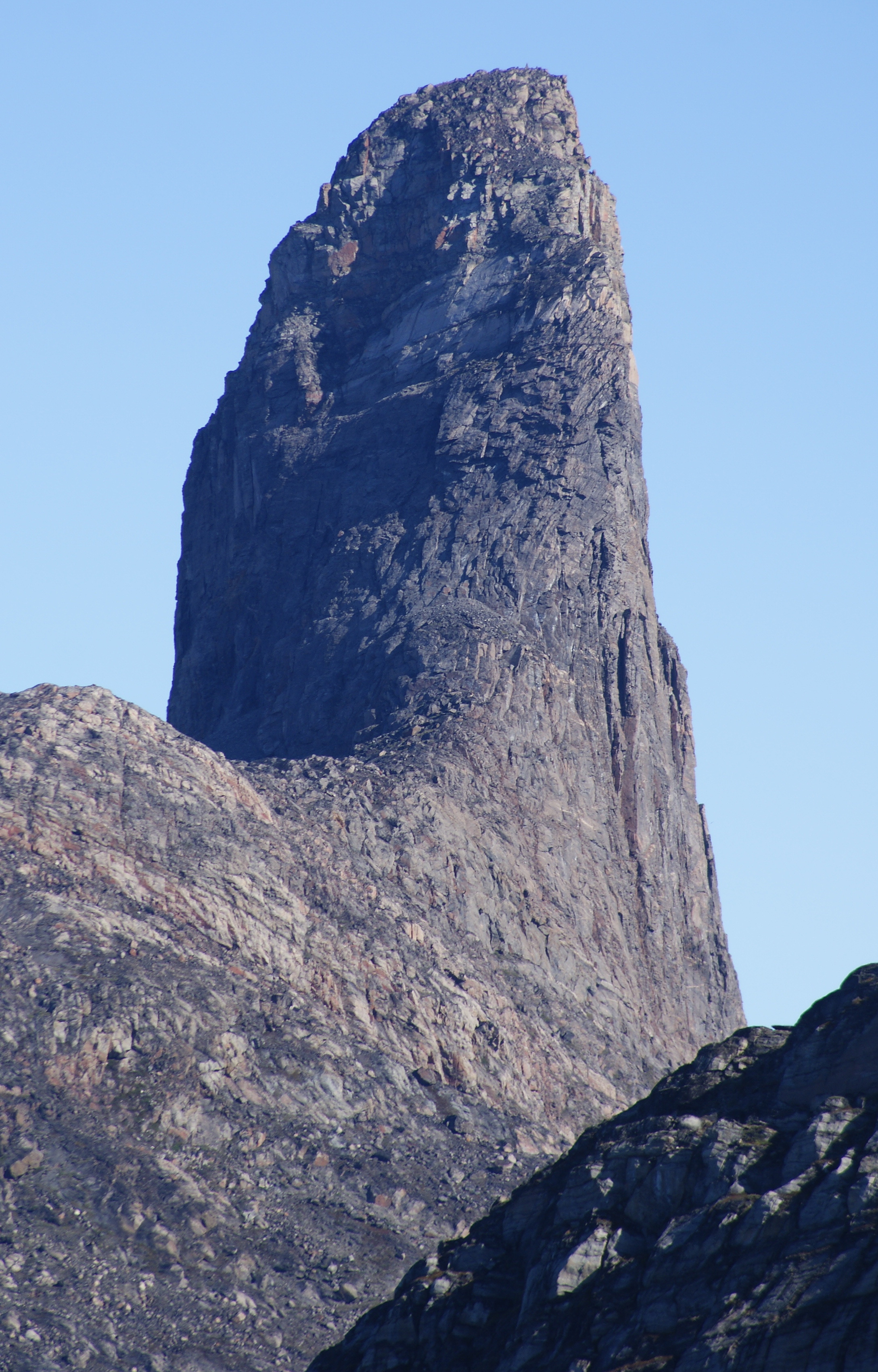
- Devil's Thumb seen from the southwest

Highest point
- Elevation: 546 m (1,791 ft)
- Prominence: 546 m (1,791 ft)
- Coordinates: 74°35′37″N 57°08′28″W

Geography
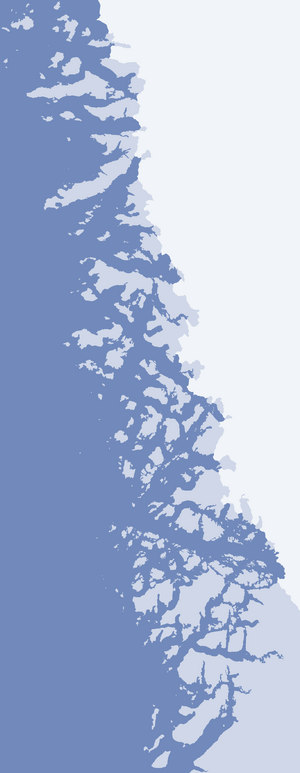
- Location within Upernavik Archipelago
- Location: Kullorsuaq Island, Upernavik Archipelago, Greenland

Devil's Thumb (Greenlandic: Kullorsuaq, Danish: Djævelens Tommelfinger) is a pinnacle-shaped, 546 m (1,791 ft) mountain in the Avannaata municipality in northwestern Greenland.

== Geography ==
Devil's Thumb is located in the central part of Kullorsuaq Island, an island in the northern part of Upernavik Archipelago, in Melville Bay, approximately 3 km (1.9 mi) to the north of the Kullorsuaq settlement.

It is a familiar feature for Arctic navigators, similar to the Melville Monument further north, but bigger.
