= Nunatakassaup Sermia (disambiguation) =

Nunatakassaup Sermia may refer to the following glaciers in Greenland:

- Nunatakassaup Sermia, a glacier in Melville Bay in northwestern Greenland
- Nunatakassaup Sermia (Tasiusaq Bay), a glacier in Tasiusaq Bay in northwestern Greenland
