= Alison Bay =

Bay in Avannaata, Greenland

- Kullorsuup Kangerlua (Greenlandic)
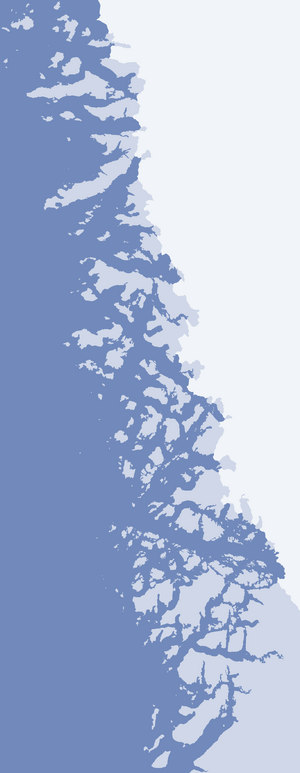
- Alison Bay (Upernavik Archipelago)
- Location: Upernavik Archipelago
- Coordinates: 74°32′N 56°25′W
- Ocean/sea sources: Baffin Bay
- Basin countries: Greenland
- Max. length: 20.5 km (12.7 mi)

Alison Bay (Greenlandic: Kullorsuup Kangerlua) is a bay in Avannaata municipality in northwestern Greenland. The bay is a tributary bay of Melville Bay, and is located in the northern part of Upernavik Archipelago, between Kiatassuaq Island in the southwest and the mainland of Greenland in the northeast.

== Geography ==
Alison Bay is 20.5 km (12.7 mi) long. Part of the southern Melville Bay region, the bay is frozen for most of the year. In the northeast, it is bounded by the Wandel Land nunatak, culminating in an unnamed 931 m (3,054 ft) peak. Iterlassuaq, a small indentation of the bay separates Wandel Land in the north from Qaqqasungnarsuaq − another, smaller nunatak, culminating in an unnamed 510 m (1,670 ft) peak.

A small unnamed glacier tongue of Greenland ice sheet drains the latter into the innermost part of the bay, east of the opening of the Ikerasaa Strait. The strait flows west-south-westward between Kiatassuaq Island in the north, and Sanningassorsuaq Peninsula in the south. The entrance to the strait is split into two channels, with a small Milissua Island straddling the middle.

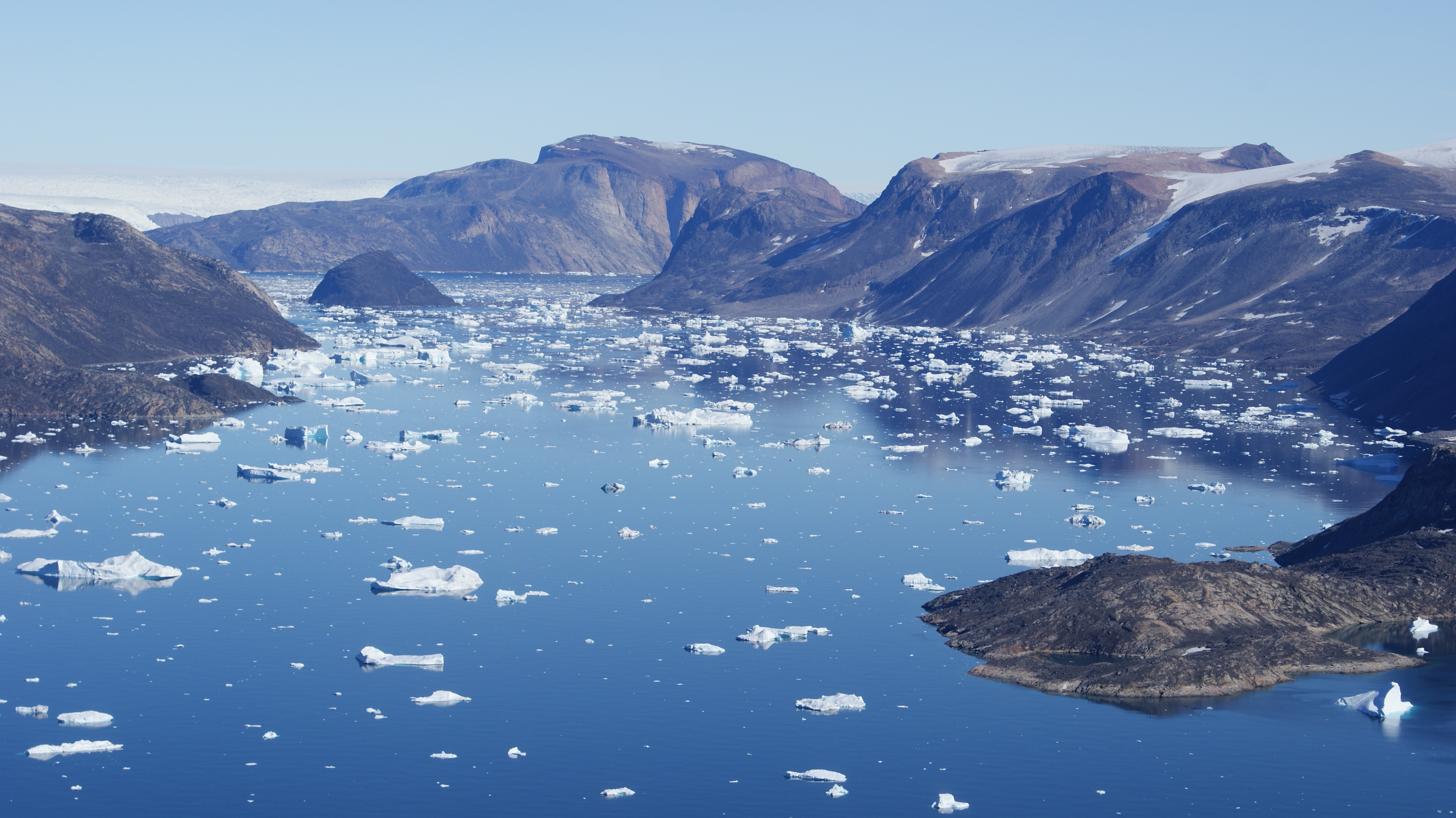
Left to right: Saqqarlersuaq Island, Greenland ice sheet (behind), Saqqarlersuup Sullua (front), tiny Uummannaarsukassak Island, Alison Bay (behind), Wandel Land (farther behind), Kiatassuaq Island.
