= Nunatakassaup Sermia =

Glacier in Greenland

- Interactive map of Nunatakassaup Sermia
- Location: Upernavik Archipelago, Greenland
- Coordinates: 74°37′30″N 56°20′00″W
- Terminus: Melville Bay

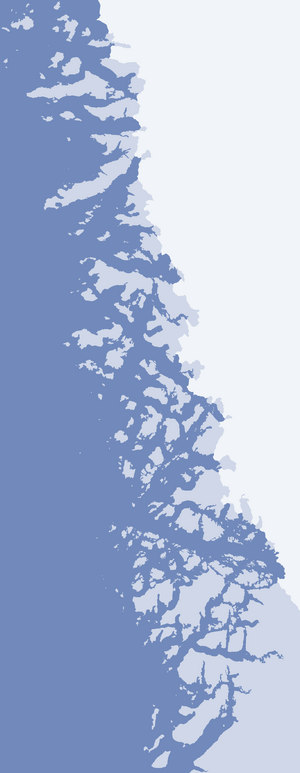
Nunatakassaup Sermia (Upernavik Archipelago)

Nunatakassaup Sermia (old spelling: Nunatakavsaup Sermia) is a tidewater glacier in Avannaata municipality on the northwestern shore of Greenland. It drains the Greenland ice sheet westwards into Melville Bay. The glacier front is located between the Nunatakassak nunatak in the north, and the Wandel Land nunatak in the south.
