= Melville Monument (Greenland) =

Island in Avannaata, Greenland

Native name: Usuussarsuaq
- Location within Greenland

Geography
- Location: Melville Bay, Greenland
- Coordinates: 75°38′N 58°31′W
- Highest elevation: 332 m (1089 ft)

Administration
- Greenland
- Municipality: Avannaata

Demographics
- Population: uninhabited

Melville Monument (Greenlandic: Usuussarsuaq) is an island in the Avannaata municipality, NW Greenland.

It was named "Melville Monument" by Arctic explorer Sir John Ross in July 1818.

The island is located in Melville Bay, separated from the coast by a narrow sound. It is a peaked island, familiar to Arctic navigators, similar to Kullorsuaq further south, but smaller.

== Literature ==
- Clements R. Markham, Life of Admiral Sir Leopold McClintock,
- T. C. Chamberlin, Glacial Studies in Greenland. III. Coast Glaciers between Disco Island and Inglefield Gulf

== See also ==
- List of islands of Greenland
