= Illullip Sermia =

Glacier in Greenland

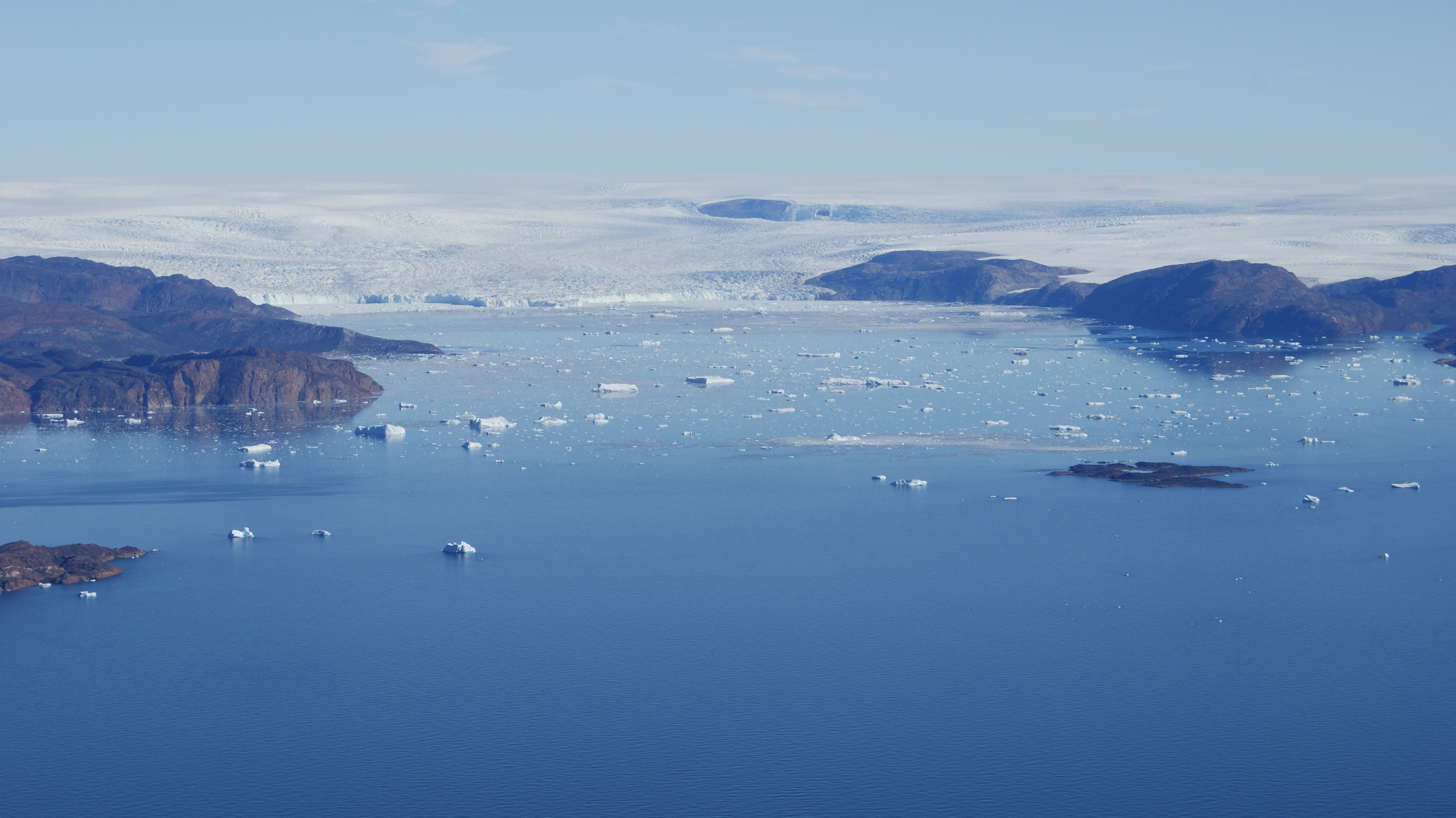
- Aerial view of the glacier front
- Interactive map of Illullip Sermia
- Location: Upernavik Archipelago, Greenland
- Coordinates: 74°24′30″N 56°0′0″W
- Terminus: Inussulik Bay

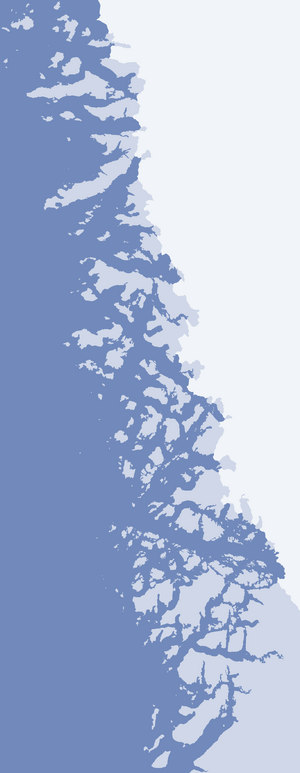
Illulip Sermia (Upernavik Archipelago)

Illullip Sermia is a tidewater glacier in Avannaata municipality on the northwestern shore of Greenland. It drains the Greenland ice sheet southwestwards into Inussulik Bay, an inlet of Baffin Bay. The glacier front is located between the Sanningassorsuaq Peninsula in the north, and the base of Illulissuaq Peninsula in the south. The glacier front is located at 74°22′40″N 56°04′50″W.
