= Saqqarlersuup Sullua =

Strait in Avannaata, Greenland

Coordinates: 74°32′30″N 56°56′00″W

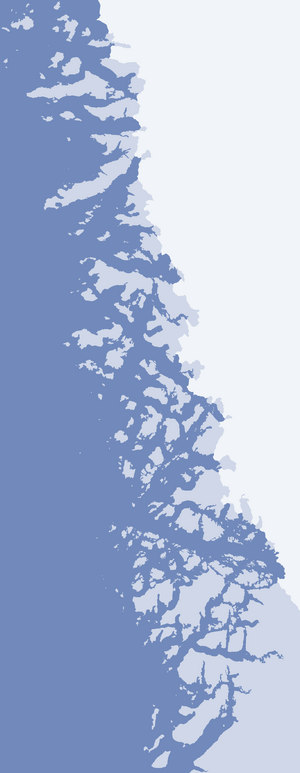
Saqqarlersuup Sullua (Upernavik Archipelago)

Saqqarlersuup Sullua (old spelling: Sarqardlersûp Suvdlua) is a strait in the Upernavik Archipelago in Avannaata municipality in northwestern Greenland.

== Geography ==
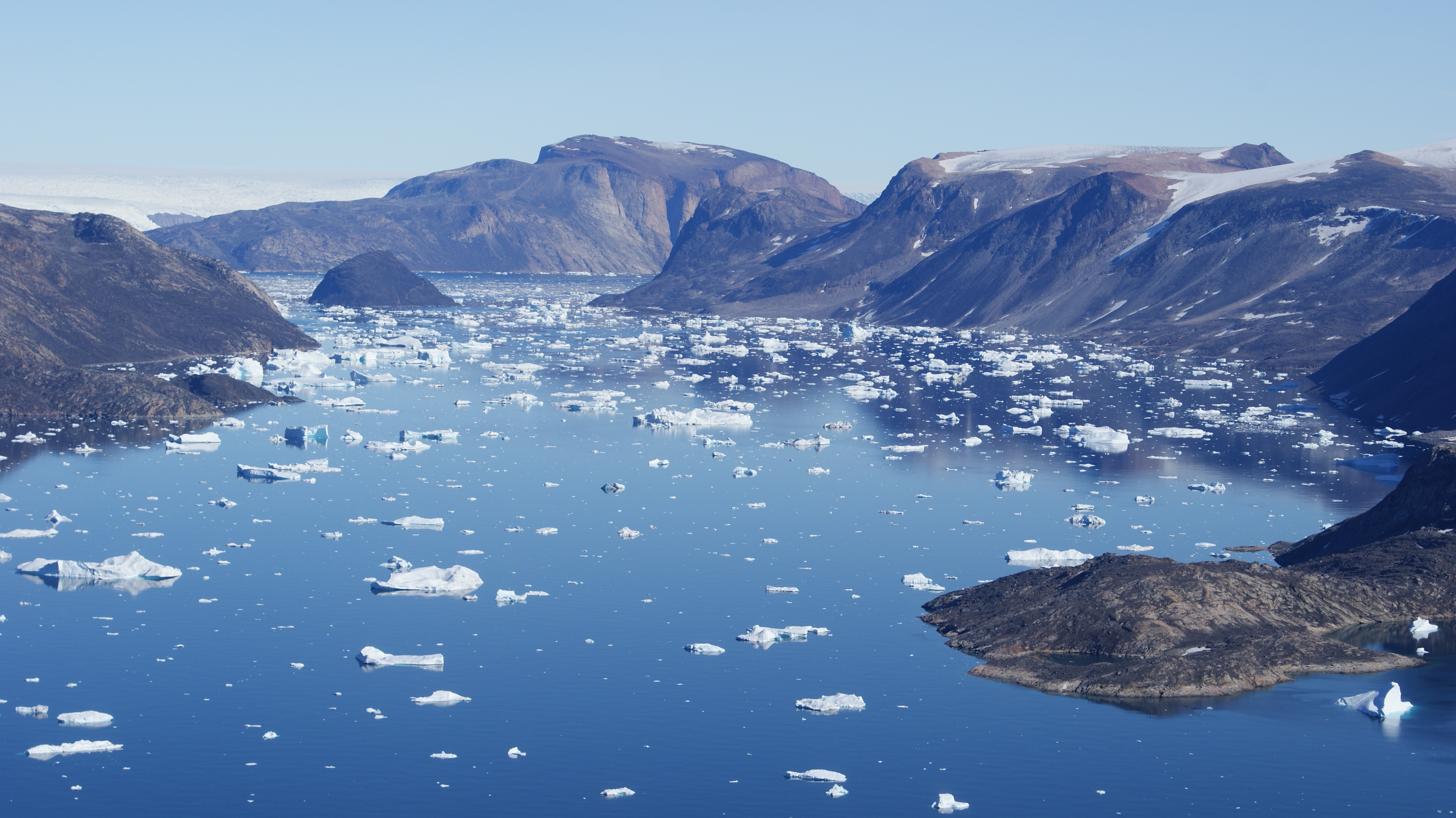
Left to right: Saqqarlersuaq Island, Greenland ice sheet (behind), Saqqarlersuup Sullua (front), tiny Uummannaarsukassak Island, Alison Bay (behind), Wandel Land (farther behind), and Kiatassuaq Island.

The strait is 11 km (6.8 mi) long and less than 4 km (2.5 mi) wide. Located in the northern part of Upernavik Archipelago, it is an inner waterway of Melville Bay, linking Alison Bay in the northeast with the open waters of the former in the west. The strait separates Kiatassuaq Island in the south from Saqqarlersuaq Island in the north.
