= Ikerasaa Strait =

Strait in Avannaata, Greenland

Coordinates: 74°28′N 56°35′W

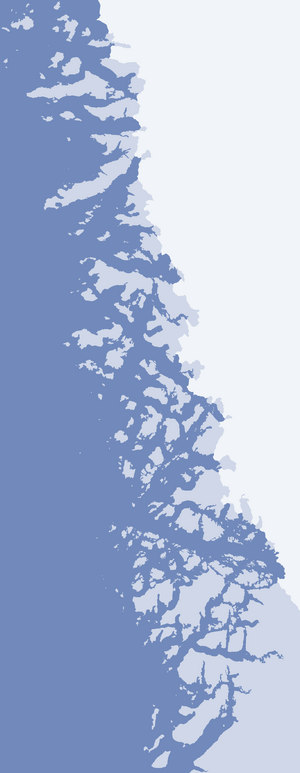
Ikerasaa Strait (Upernavik Archipelago)

Ikerasaa Strait (old spelling: Ikerasâ) is a strait in the Upernavik Archipelago in Avannaata municipality in northwestern Greenland. The strait separates Kiatassuaq Island in the north from the mainland Sanningassorsuaq Peninsula in the south. The name of the strait is the local dialect version of ikerasak, a generic word for 'strait' in the Greenlandic language.

== Geography ==
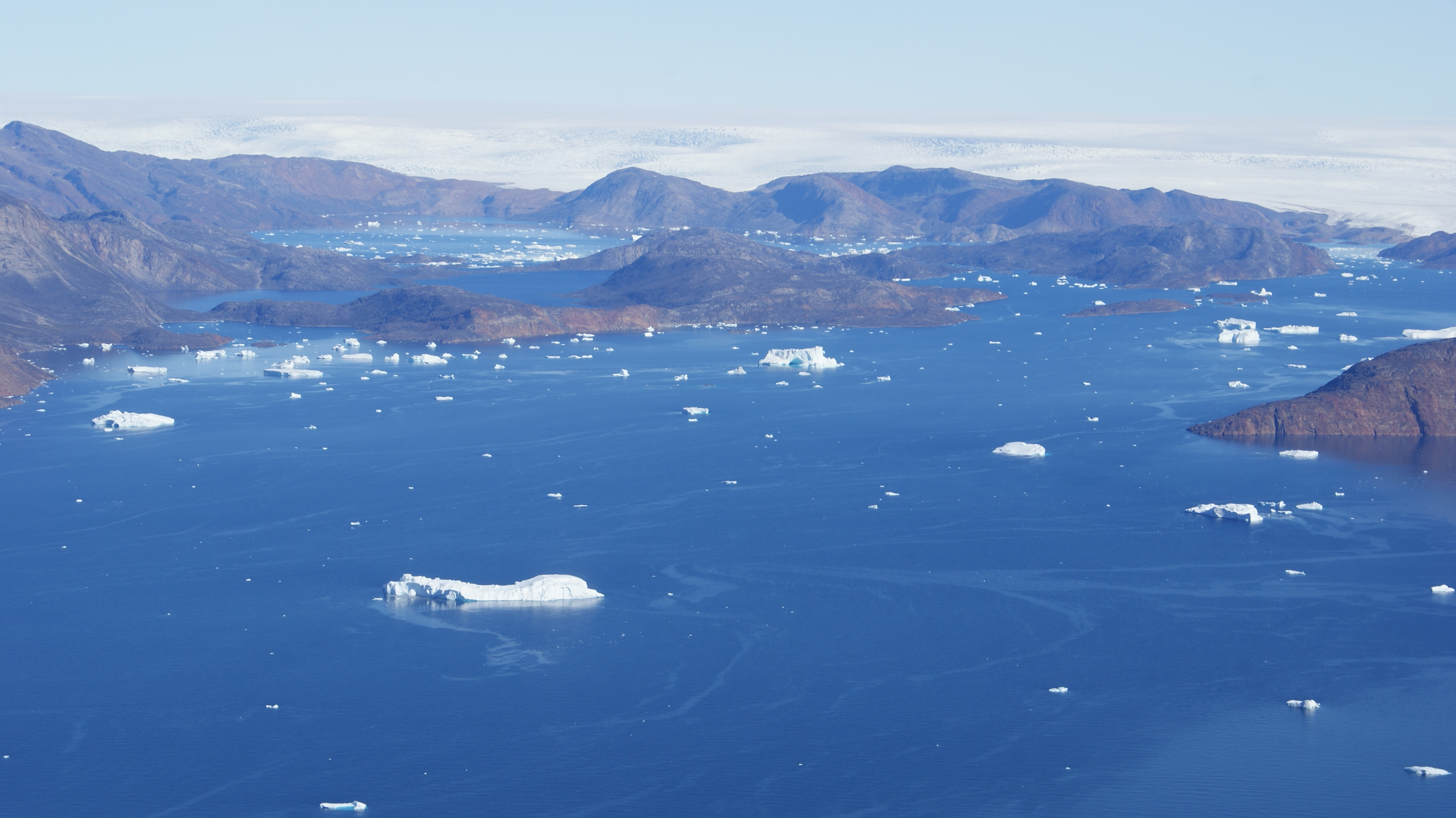
Aerial view of Ikerasaa Strait, Milissua Island, and the western cape on Sanningassorsuaq Peninsula

The strait is 17 km (11 mi) long and at most 3.7 km (2.3 mi) wide. Located in the northern part of Upernavik Archipelago, it is an inner waterway of Inussulik Bay, linking it with Alison Bay in the northeast. In the northwest, the strait is bounded by the mountainous Kiatassuaq Island. In the northwest, the strait splits into two channels, with the small Milissua Island straddling the middle.

The northern channel is very narrow, and both channels often choked with icebergs from the Greenland ice sheet (Greenlandic: Sermersuaq) reaching the waterline at the east end of the strait, and the confluence with Alison Bay. The southern coast of the strait is undeveloped, formed by the Sanningassorsuaq Peninsula, and the nunatak at its root.
