= Kiatassuaq Island =

Island in Greenland

Kiatassuaq
Holm Ø
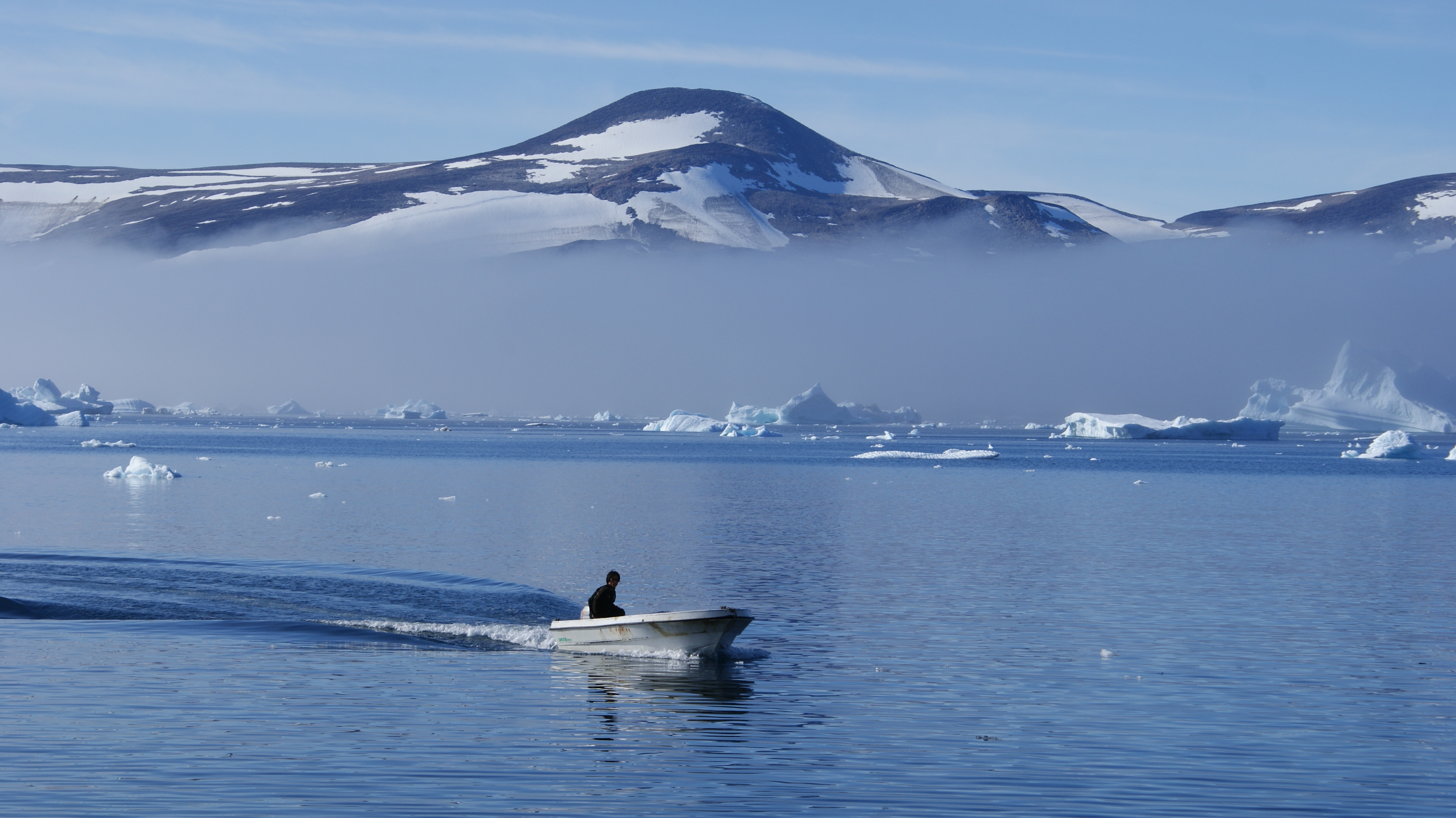
- Icebergs and late morning fog near the northern shore of Kiatassuaq Island

- Location within Greenland

Geography
- Location: Greenland
- Coordinates: 74°30′45″N 56°58′0″W
- Archipelago: Upernavik Archipelago
- Area: 180.9 km^{2} (69.8 sq mi)
- Length: 32.76 km (20.356 mi)
- Width: 15.86 km (9.855 mi)
- Coastline: 81.8 km (50.83 mi)
- Highest elevation: 940 m (3080 ft)

Administration
- Greenland
- Municipality: Avannaata

Kiatassuaq Island (old spelling: Kiatagssuaq, Danish: Holm Ø, Holm Island) is an uninhabited island in the northern Upernavik Archipelago in Avannaata municipality in northwestern Greenland. It marks the southern border of Melville Bay.

== History ==
The name of the island means "a large torso" in the Greenlandic language. Initially, before the northbound migration phase of the 1920s, the island was named differently: "Nuussuaq Ungalleq", or the farther large point, in reference to Nuussuaq Peninsula and Nuussuaq settlement some 45 kilometers to the south, with both names translating as "large tip".

Its Danish name 'Holm Ø' ('Holm Island') had been given in honour of officer of the Danish Navy and Arctic explorer Gustav Holm (1849 – 1940).

== Geography ==
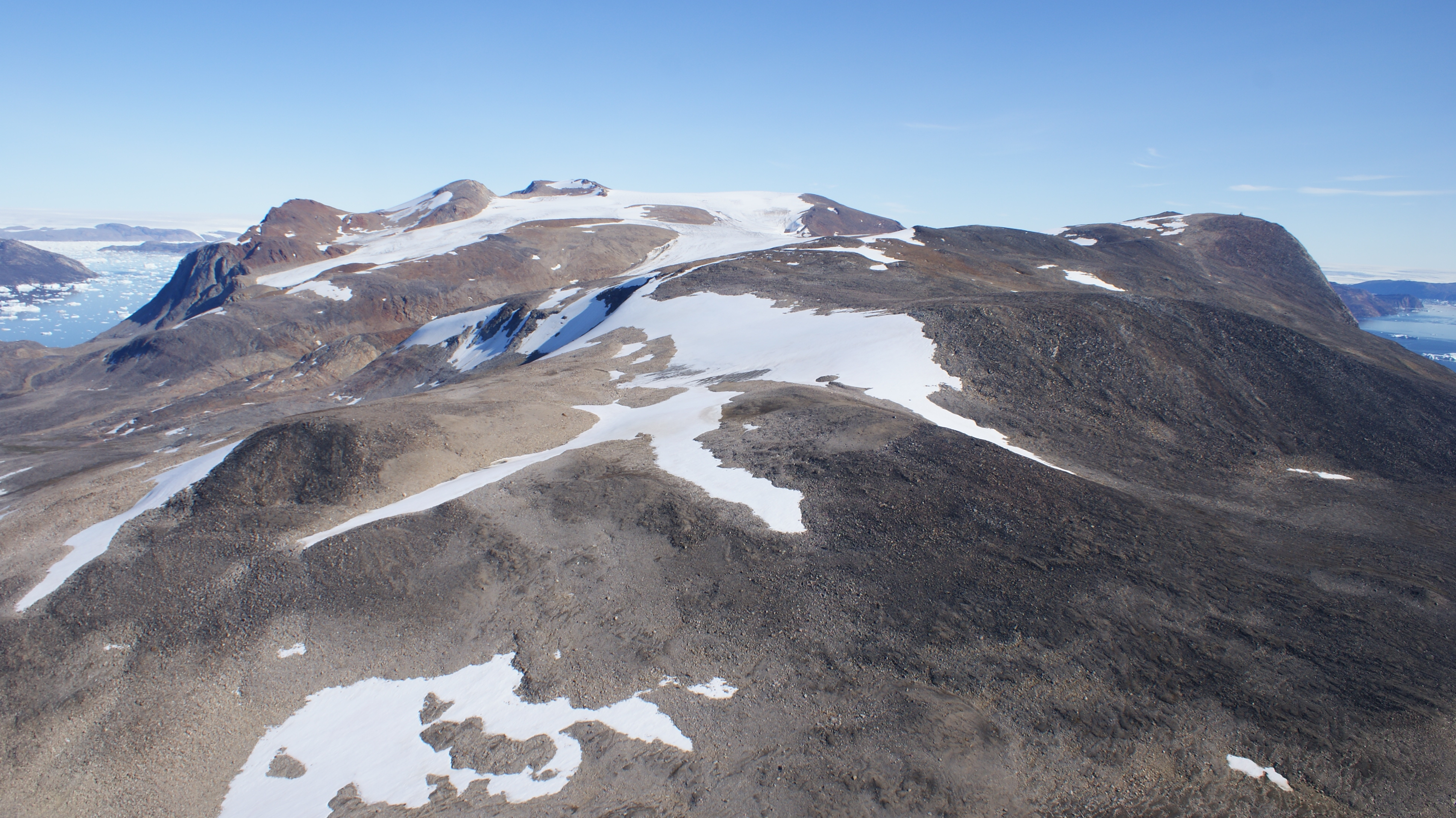
The central mountain ridge in the interior of the island

Located in the southern part of Melville Bay, Kiatassuaq Island has an elongated shape, with an east–west orientation. It has an area of 180.9 km^{2} (69.8 mi^{2}), with a shoreline of 81.8 km (50.8 mi). Kullorsuaq is the closest settlement to Kiatassuaq Island, located on an island of the same name, 6.5 km (4.0 mi) to the north. Kiatassuaq Island is accessible only by boat.

The island is separated from the Sanningassorsuaq Peninsula on the mainland of Greenland by the Ikerasaa Strait. The strait is split into two channels, with the small Millissua Island straddling the middle. In the northeast, the Alison Bay separates the island from the Wandel Land nunatak. In the north, the Saqqarlersuup Sullua separates the island from the smaller, rocky Saqqarlersuaq Island and Kullorsuaq Island.

=== Coastline ===
The coastline of the island is generally undeveloped, with small inlets only in its eastern end, near the Ikerasaa Strait and the sibling Milissua Island.

==== Promontories ====
Name	Direction	Latitude N	Longitude W
(none)	Northern Cape	74°33′42″	56°40′15″
Aukarnersuaq	Northeastern Cape	74°31′42″	56°28′13″
(none)	Eastern Cape	74°30′18″	56°24′16″
(none)	Southern Cape	74°28′10″	57°06′30″
Wilcox Head	Western Cape	74°29′25″	57°30′45″

Although the southern boundary of Melville Bay is arbitrary, it is Wilcox Head, the western cape of Kiatassuaq Island, which is the most commonly referred to as the southern limit of the bay. Other definitions limit the bay to the Little Renland nunatak farther north where the coastline of mainland Greenland veers to the northwest, or expand it southwards to Nuussuaq Peninsula, on the other side of Inussulik Bay.

== Lakes and mountains ==
There is a number of smaller mountain lakes on the island, and one larger Tasersuaq Lake at the lower, eastern end of the island. The island is very mountainous, with a glaciated ridge spanning its entire length. The highest point on the island is an unnamed peak of 940 m (3,080 ft) in the center of the island. Several other summits of the island ridge exceed 700 m (2,300 ft), from the massif overlooking Tasersuaq Lake in the east to the bastion over the Wilcox Head promontory in the west.

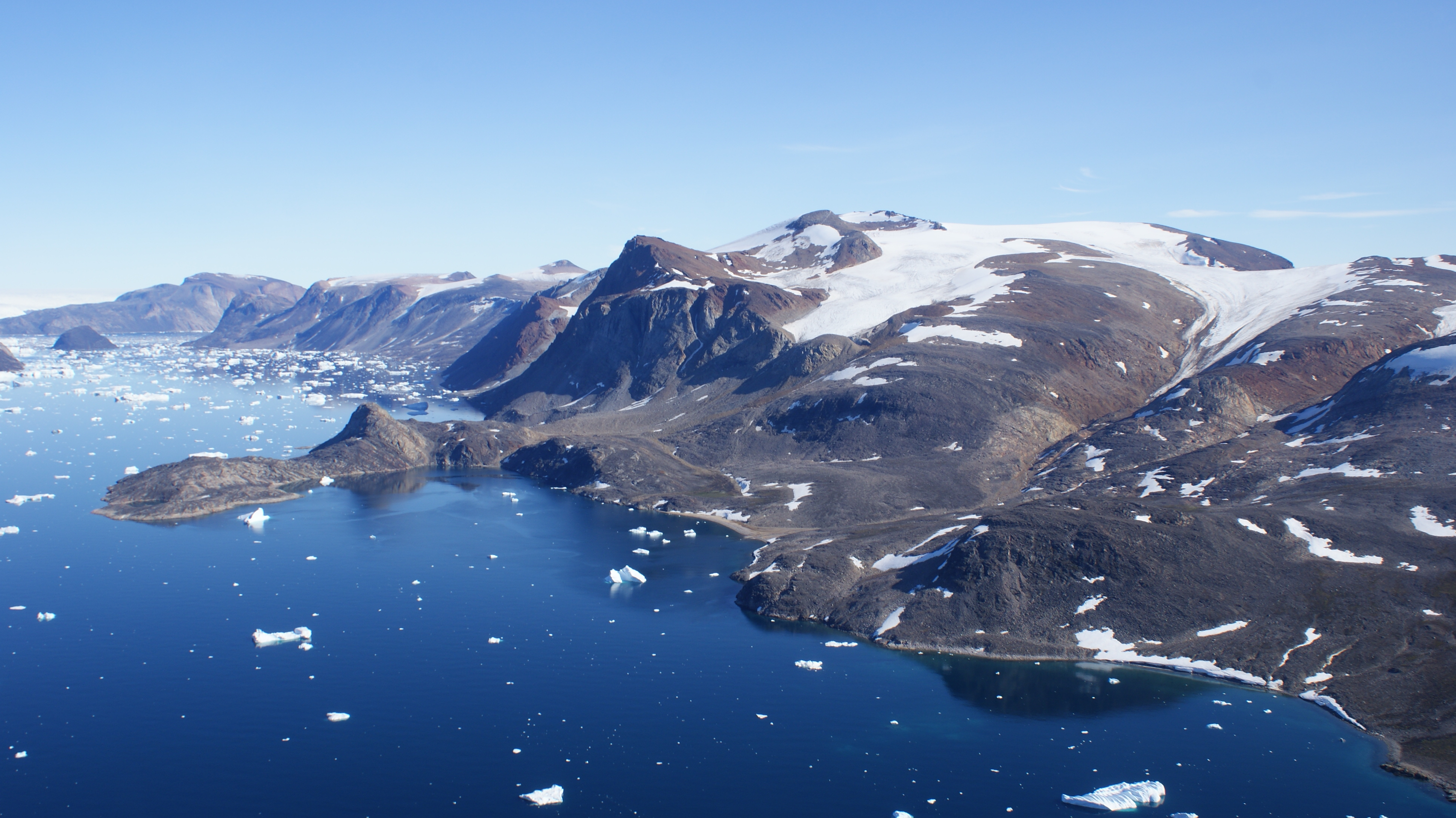
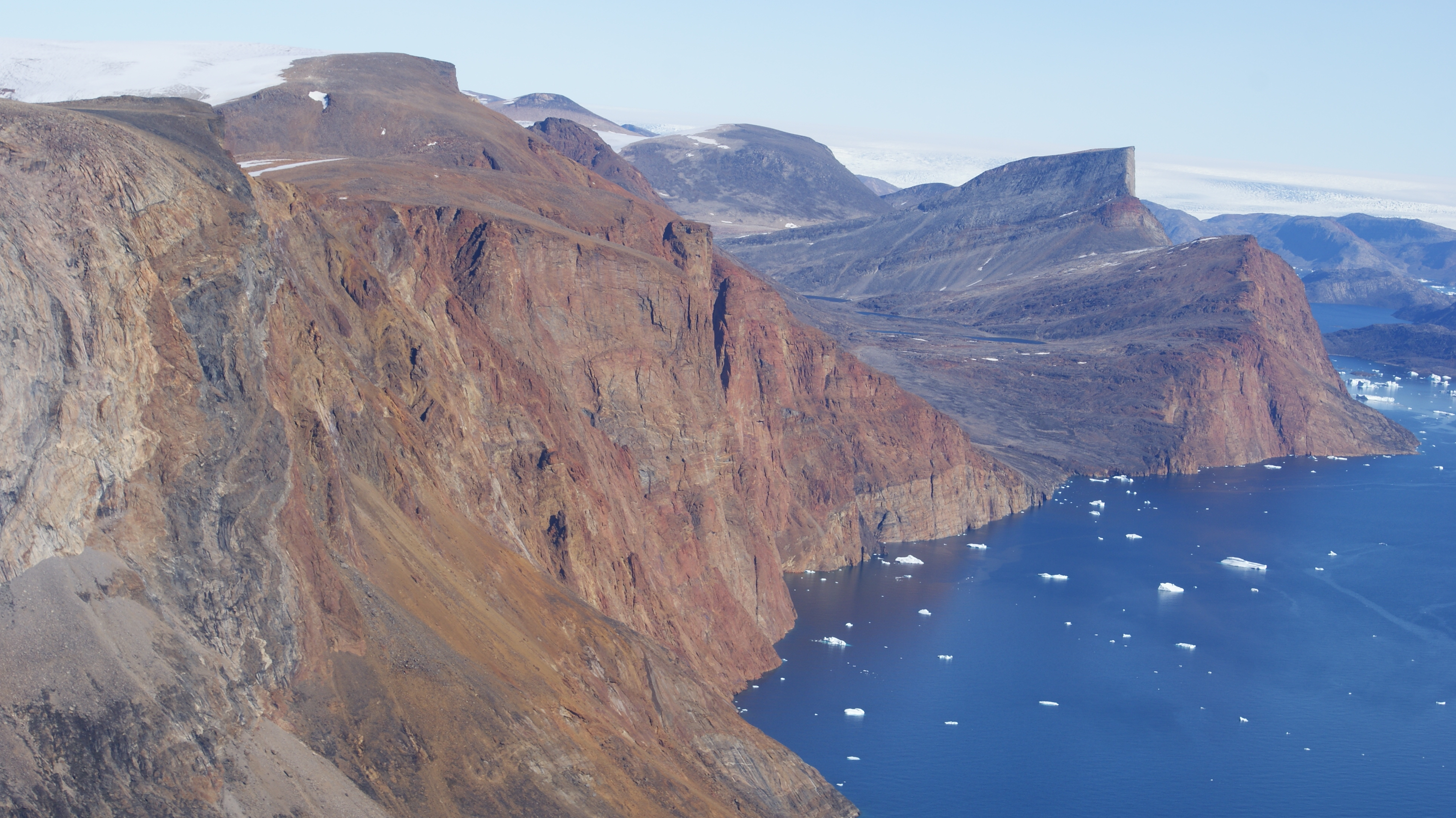
The mountainous coastline seen from the north (left) and south (right) − the partially glaciated central mountain ridge dominates the geography of Kiatassuaq island.
