= Devils Thumb (Washington) =

Mountain in Washington (state), United States

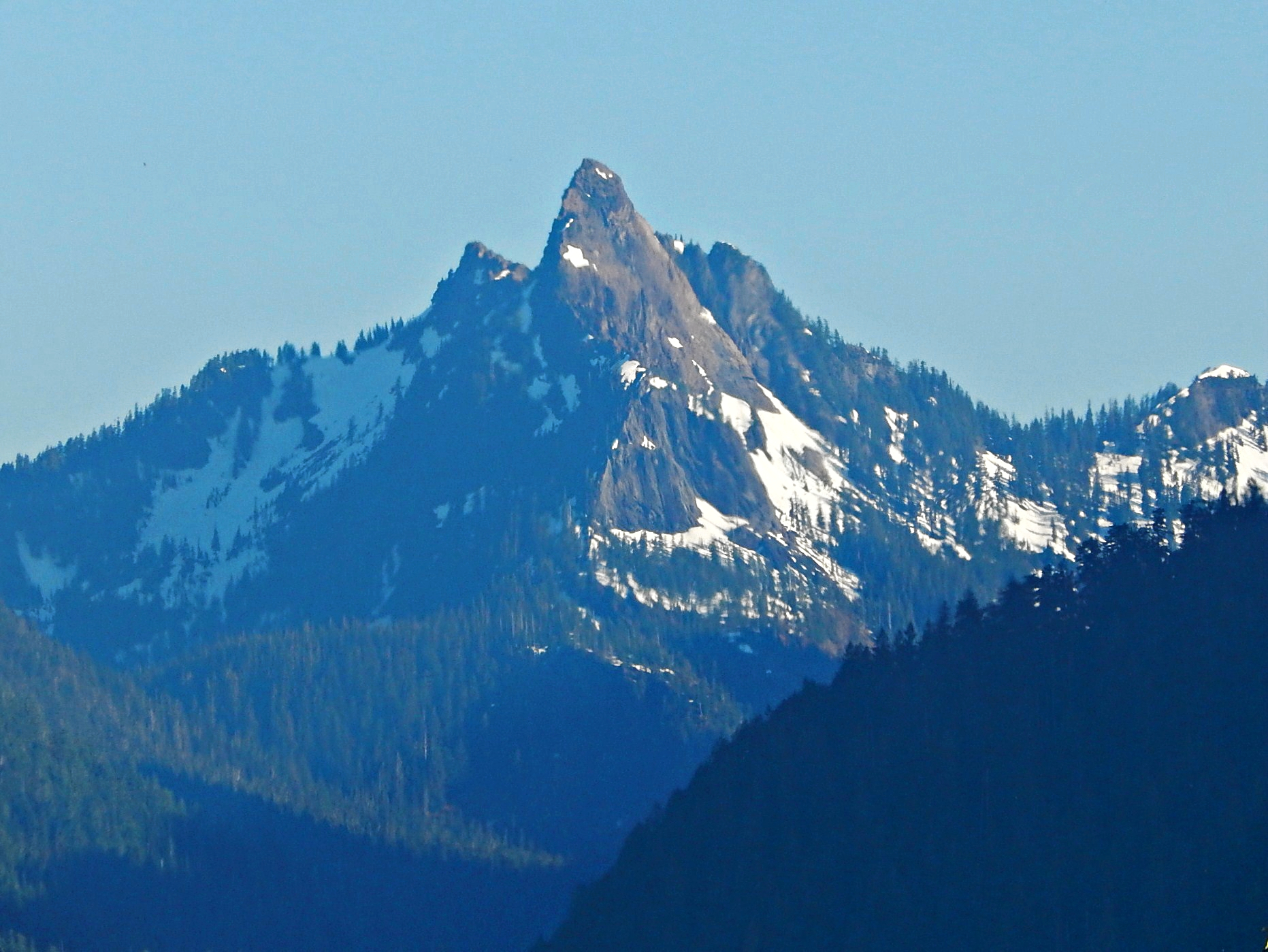
- North aspect, from Darrington

Highest point
- Elevation: 5,172 ft (1,576 m)
- Prominence: 744 ft (227 m)
- Parent peak: Devils Peak (5,456 ft)
- Isolation: 0.83 mi (1.34 km)
- Coordinates: 48°07′43″N 121°32′55″W

Geography
- Location within Washington (state) Location within the United States
- Country: United States
- State: Washington
- County: Snohomish
- Protected area: Mount Baker-Snoqualmie National Forest
- Parent range: Cascade Range
- Topo map: USGS Helena Ridge

Climbing
- Easiest route: Scrambling

Devils Thumb is a 5,172-foot-elevation (1,576-meter) mountain summit in Snohomish County, Washington, United States. It is located near the western edge of the North Cascades, 10 miles south of Darrington, Washington, and 20 miles west of Glacier Peak which is one of the Cascade stratovolcanoes. The peak is situated on land administered by Mount Baker-Snoqualmie National Forest. The nearest higher neighbor is Devils Peak, 0.79 miles (1.27 km) to the southwest. Precipitation runoff from the south slope of Devils Thumb drains into Coal Creek which is a tributary of the Stillaguamish River, whereas the other slopes drain into Helena Creek → Clear Creek → Sauk River. Although modest in elevation, topographic relief is significant as the summit rises over 2,100 feet (640 meters) above Helena Lake in one-half mile (0.8 km). This mountain's toponym has been officially adopted by the United States Board on Geographic Names.

== Climate ==
Devils Thumb is located in the marine west coast climate zone of western North America. Most weather fronts originating in the Pacific Ocean travel northeast toward the Cascade Mountains. As fronts approach the Cascades, they are forced upward by the peaks (orographic lift), causing them to drop their moisture in the form of rain or snowfall onto the Cascades. As a result, the west side of the North Cascades experiences high precipitation, especially during the winter months in the form of snowfall. Because of maritime influence, snow tends to be wet and heavy, resulting in high avalanche danger. During winter months, weather is usually cloudy, but due to high pressure systems over the Pacific Ocean that intensify during summer months, there is often little or no cloud cover during the summer. Due to its temperate climate and proximity to the Pacific Ocean, areas west of the Cascade Crest very rarely experience temperatures below 0 °F (−18 °C) or above 80 °F (27 °C).

== Geology ==
The North Cascades features some of the most rugged topography in the Cascade Range with craggy peaks, ridges, and deep glacial valleys. Geological events occurring many years ago created the diverse topography and drastic elevation changes over the Cascade Range leading to the various climate differences. These climate differences lead to vegetation variety defining the ecoregions in this area.

The history of the formation of the Cascade Mountains dates back millions of years ago to the late Eocene Epoch. With the North American Plate overriding the Pacific Plate, episodes of volcanic igneous activity persisted. In addition, small fragments of the oceanic and continental lithosphere called terranes created the North Cascades about 50 million years ago.

During the Pleistocene period dating back over two million years ago, glaciation advancing and retreating repeatedly scoured the landscape leaving deposits of rock debris. The U-shaped cross section of the river valleys is a result of recent glaciation. Uplift and faulting in combination with glaciation have been the dominant processes which have created the tall peaks and deep valleys of the North Cascades area.
