= Wandel Land =

Nunatak in Avannaata, Greenland

Coordinates: 74°34′35″N 56°20′00″W

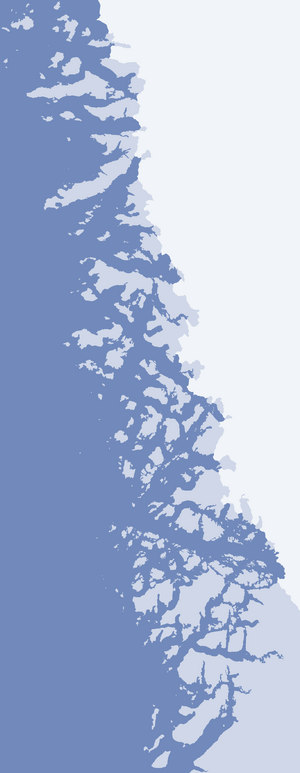
Wandel Land (Upernavik Archipelago)

Wandel Land is a 15.7 km (52,000 ft) nunatak (Greenlandic: nunataq) in Avannaata municipality in northwestern Greenland. It is one of several nunataks in the Melville Bay region of Greenland, where the Greenland ice sheet (Greenlandic: Sermersuaq) drains into the bay alongside its entire length apart from an occasional nunatak.

This nunatak is named after Danish polar explorer and hydrographer, Vice Admiral Carl Frederick Wandel (1843–1930).

== Geography ==
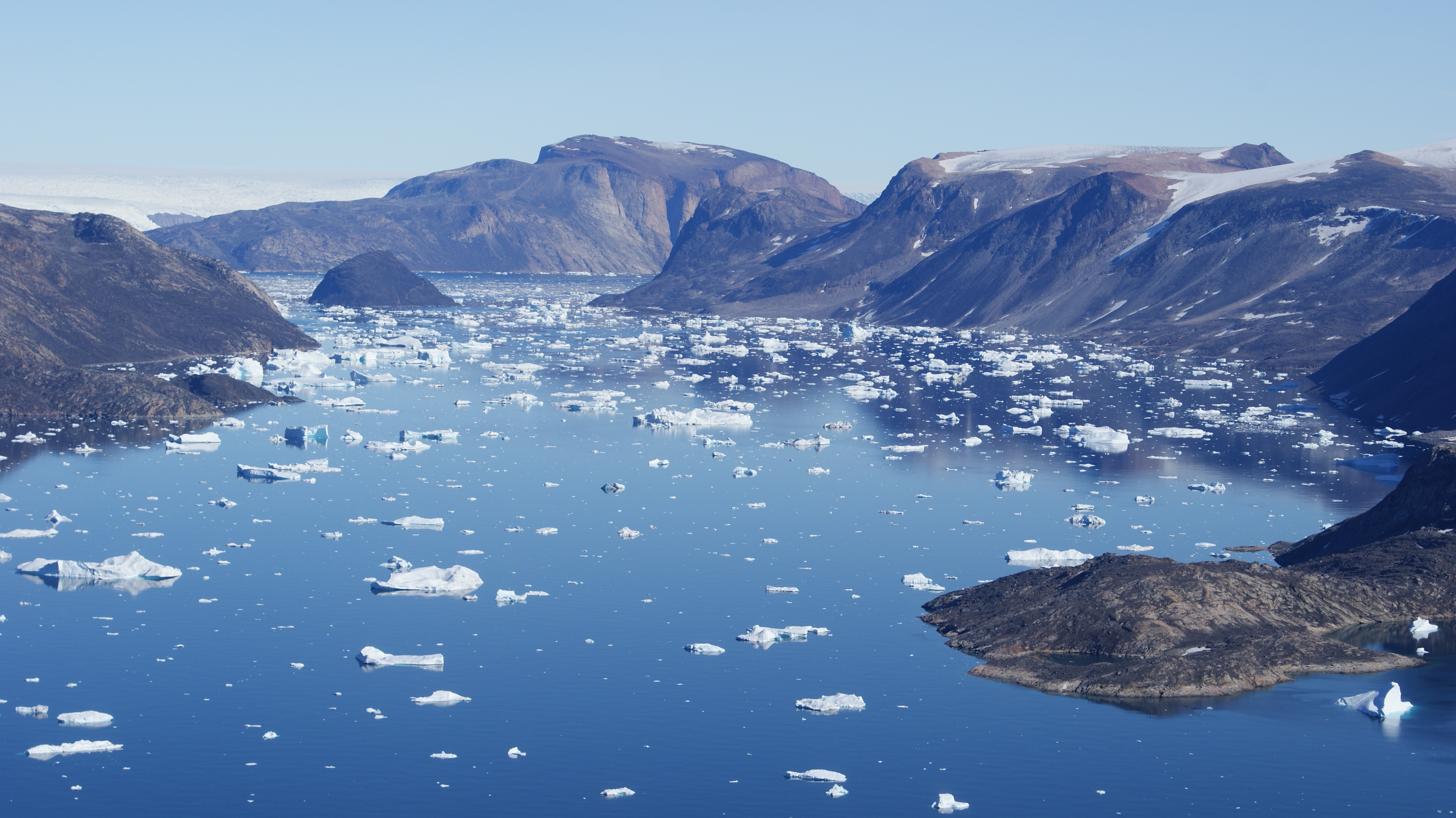
Left to right: Saqqarlersuaq Island, Greenland ice sheet (behind), Saqqarlersuup Sullua (front), tiny Uummannaarsukassak Island, Alison Bay (behind), Wandel Land (farther behind), and Kiatassuaq Island.

Wandel Land is located on the mainland of Greenland in the northernmost part of Upernavik Archipelago. To the north, Greenland ice sheet drains into Alison Bay via Nunatakassaup Sermia glacier. To the southwest, the nunatak is bounded by the iceberg-choked Alison Bay, while a small inlet of the latter, Iterlassuaq, separates Wandel Land from another, smaller nunatak in the southeast. Alison Bay separates Wandel Land from a large Kiatassuaq Island in the southwest.

There are several distinct summits on Wandel Land. The highest point is an unnamed 981 m (3,219 ft) peak in the central-western part of the massif, neighboring the 744 m (2,441 ft) Naujarsuit Qaqqat mountain from the west.
