= Sanningassorsuaq Peninsula =

Peninsula in Greenland

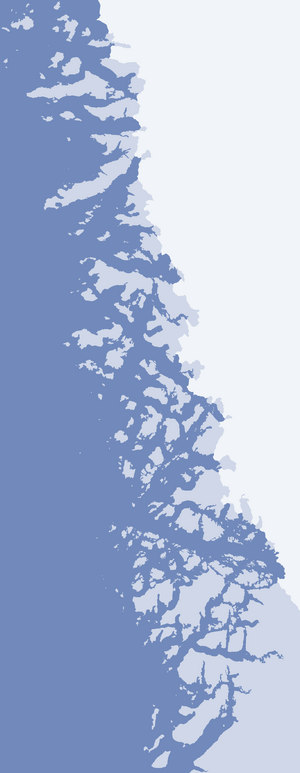
Sanningassorsuaq Peninsula (Upernavik Archipelago)

Sanningassorsuaq Peninsula (old spelling: Sáningassorssuaq) is a mainland peninsula in northwestern Greenland, located at the northern end of Upernavik Archipelago.

== Geography ==
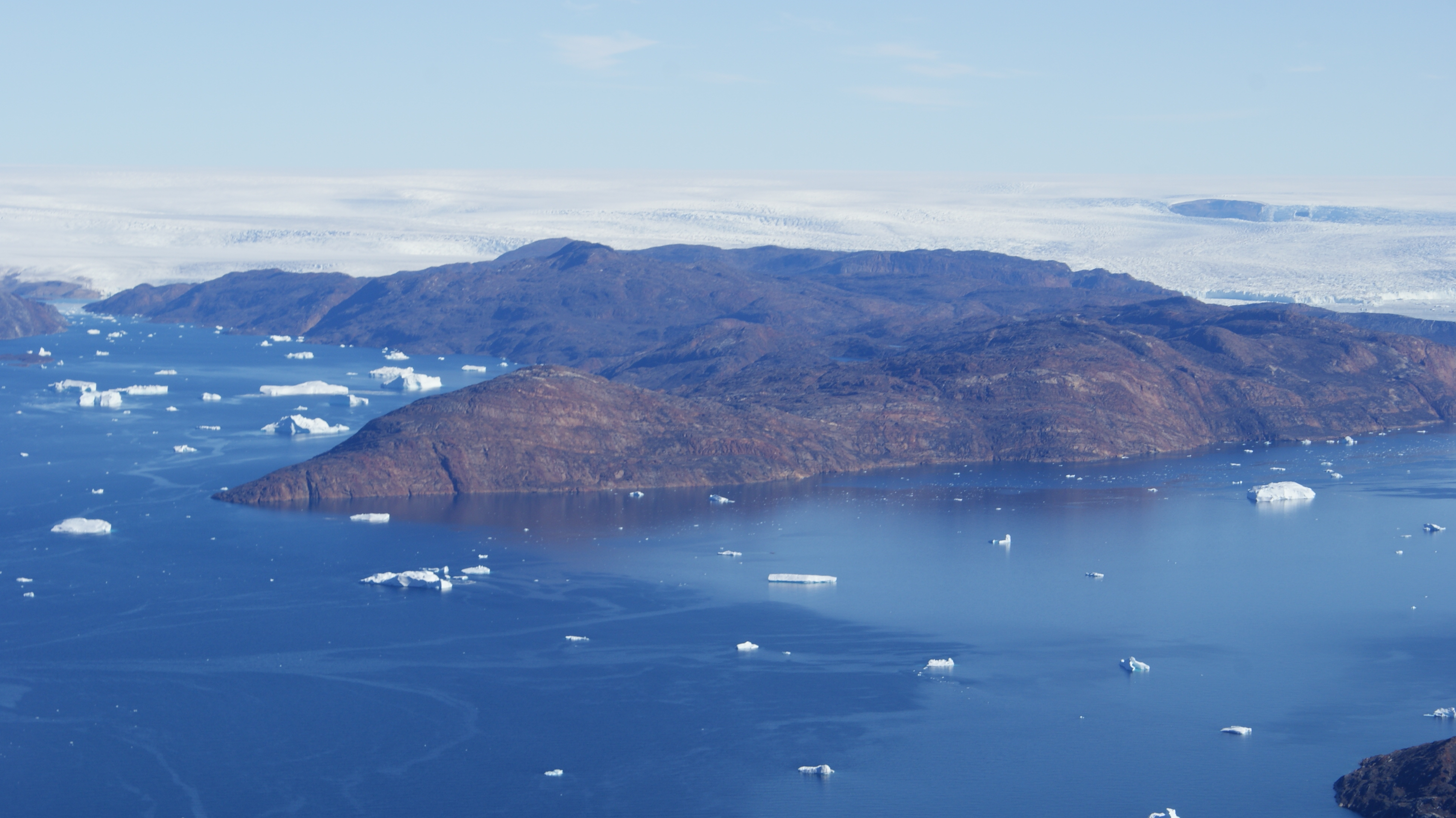
Aerial view of Sanningassorsuaq Peninsula

The Sanningassorsuaq Peninsula is 20.8 km (12.9 mi) long, and 13.2 km (8.2 mi) wide. The highest point is an unnamed summit at 539 km (335 mi) in its central part.

The base of the peninsula is a nunatak located at 74°26′30″N 56°07′00″W, and rising to 460 m (1,510 ft) above the Greenland ice sheet (Greenlandic: Sermersuaq) reaching the sea level to the south and north of the nunatak.

The peninsula has a west–east orientation, jutting into Inussulik Bay to the west. It is separated from the Kiatassuaq and Milissua islands in the north by the narrow Ikerasaa Strait. In the south, the innermost inlet of Inussulik Bay full of icebergs calved by the Illullip Sermia glacier separates the peninsula from the Illulissuaq Peninsula.

=== Promontories ===
Name	Direction	Latitude N	Longitude W
(none)	Northern Cape	74°28′42″	56°13′47″
Naajarsuit	Southern Cape	74°23′56″	56°32′45″
Sanningassorsuup Nuua	Western Cape	74°24′04″	56°48′01″
