= Wilcox Head =

Headland in Avannaata, Greenland

Coordinates: 74°29′26.6″N 57°30′51.9″W

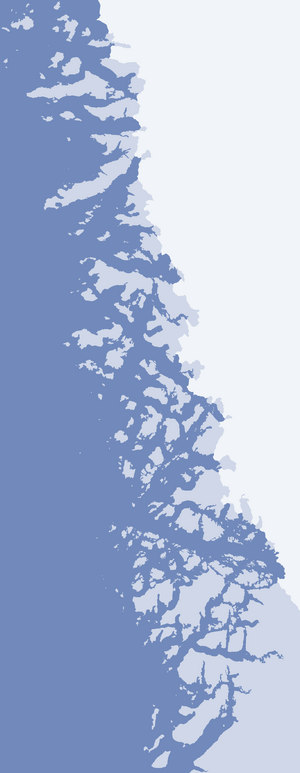
Wilcox Head (Upernavik Archipelago)

Wilcox Head is a cape in Avannaata municipality in northwestern Greenland.

== Geography ==
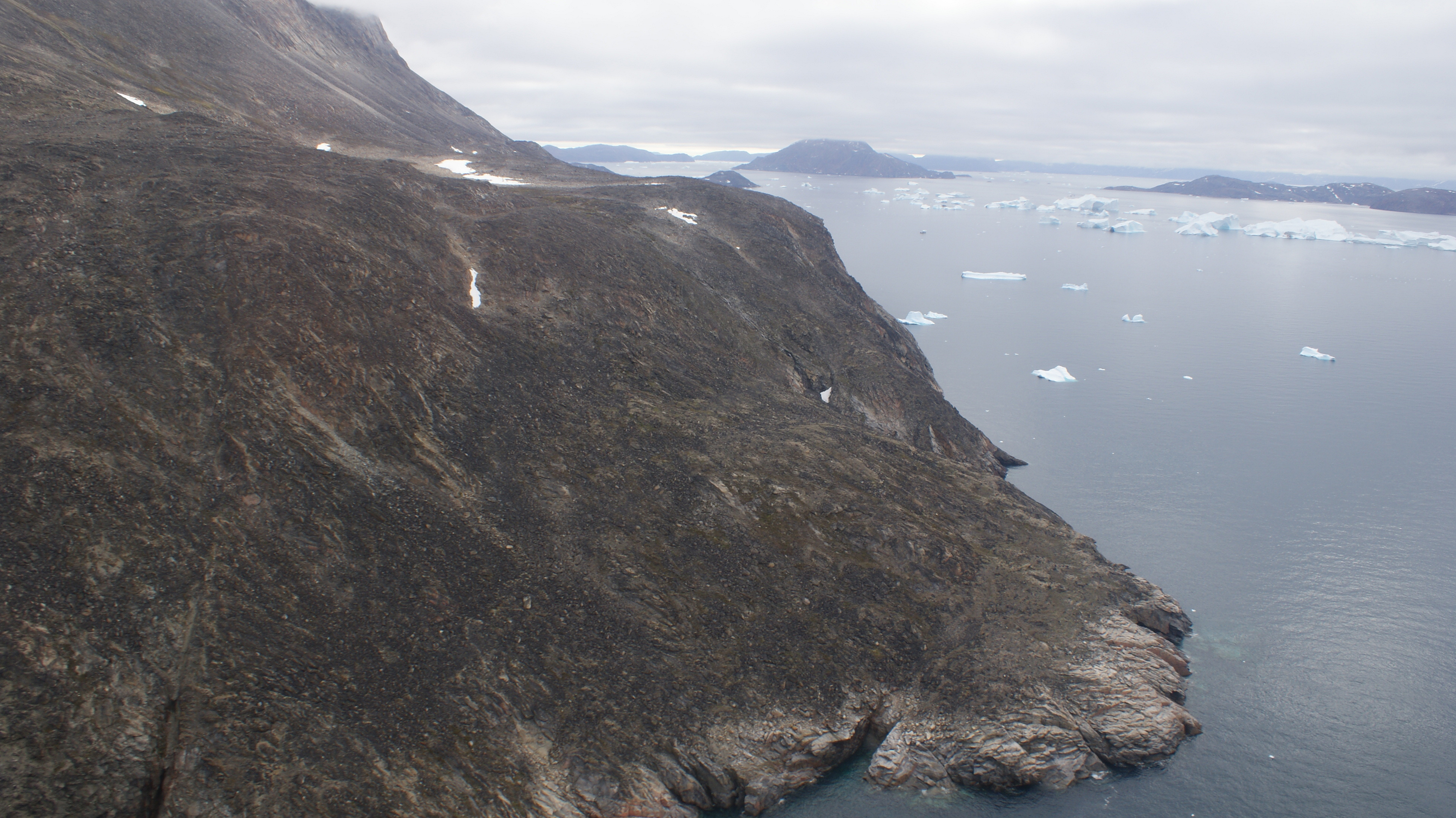
Aerial view of Wilcox Head

The cape is the western promontory on Kiatassuaq Island, delimiting the southern end of Melville Bay, with the other end defined as Cape York, 297.5 km (184.9 mi) to the northwest, in northern Baffin Bay. An alternative endpoint for the bay is Nuussuup Nuua, the western promontory on Nuussuaq Peninsula.
