= Carl Frederick Wandel =

Danish naval officer and polar explorer (1843–1930)

Carl Frederik Wandel
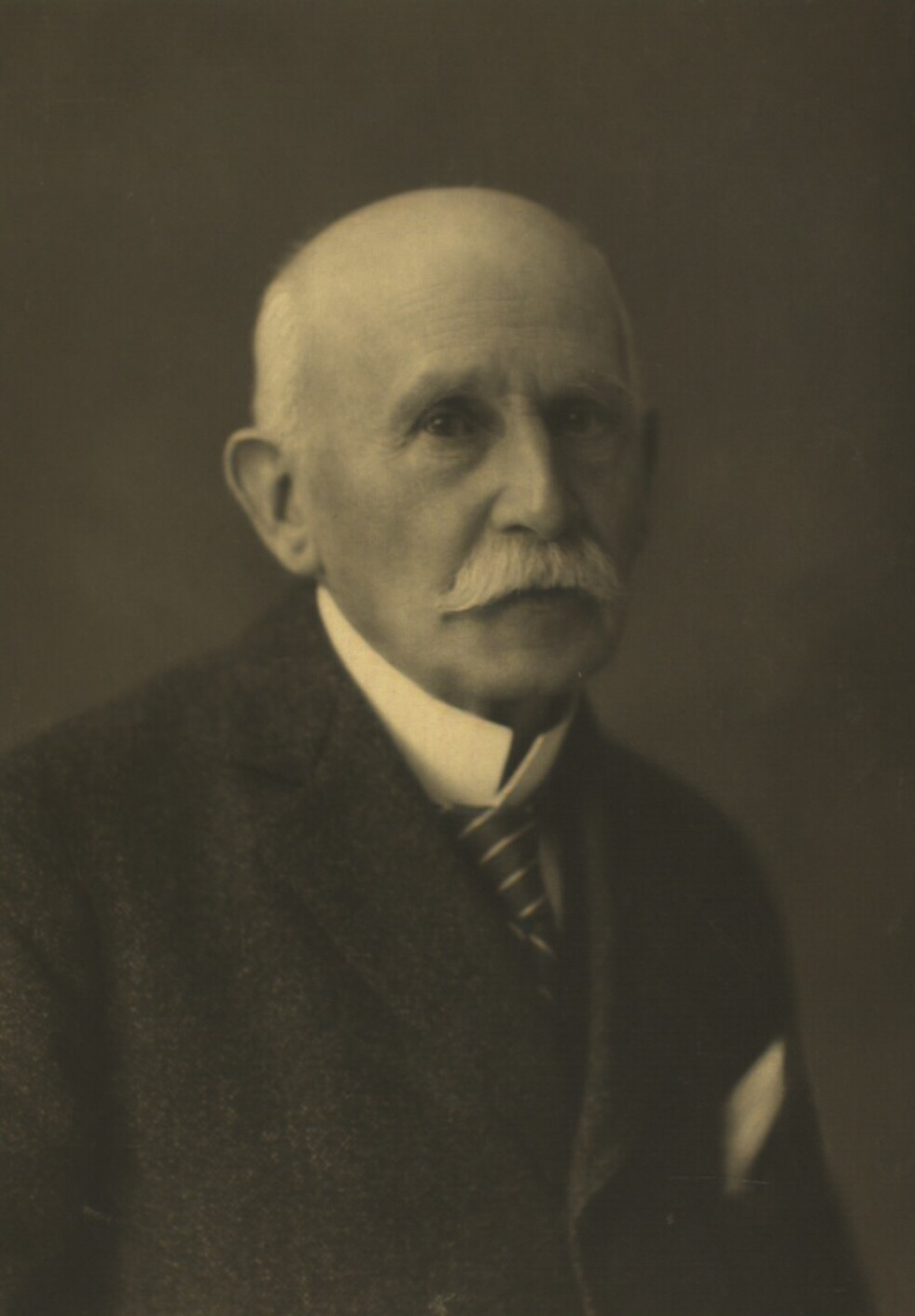
- Born: 15 August 1843; Copenhagen, Denmark
- Died: 21 April 1930 (aged 86)
- Relatives: Sigurd Wandel's uncle
- Military career
- Allegiance: Denmark
- Branch: Royal Danish Navy
- Service years: 1860–1911
- Rank: Vice Admiral
- Commands: Danish ironclad Helgoland; Ingolf Expedition
- Awards: Order of St Michael and St George

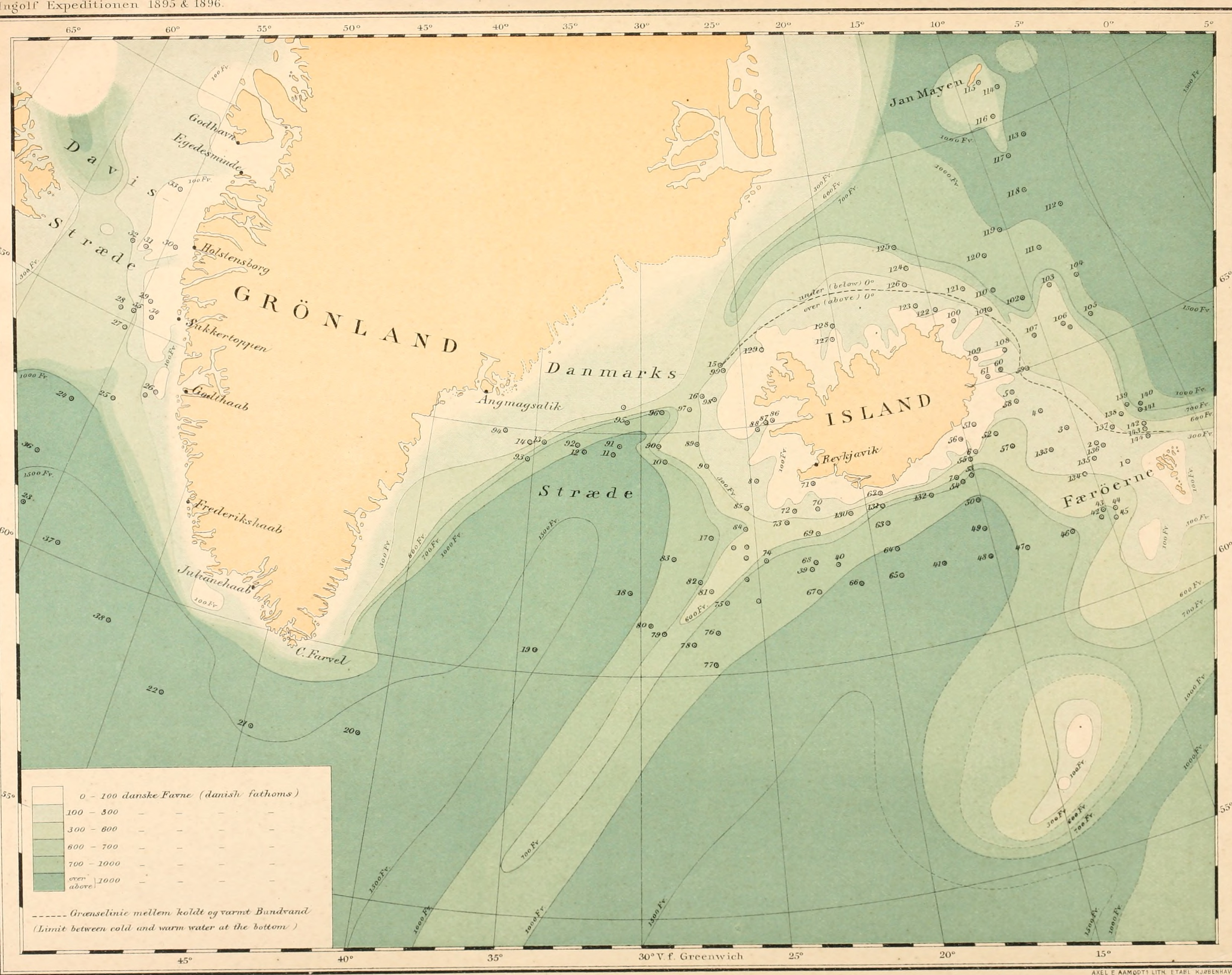
Map of the Danish Ingolf Expedition led by Wandel.

Carl Frederik Wandel (15 August 1843 – 21 April 1930) was a Danish naval officer and polar explorer. He was largely involved in hydrographic work.

Wandel became an officer of the Danish Navy in 1863, rising to the rank of captain in 1892, of Rear Admiral in 1899 and Vice Admiral in 1905. He retired from active service in 1911.

== Career ==
In 1864, Wandel served in the schooner HDMS Absalon in the Baltic Sea and in 1865–1867 he took part in a French expedition to Mexico. In 1876–1878 he was put in charge of the mail ship to Iceland and in 1880 he participated in a US oceanographic survey expedition. In 1881–1886 he was Head of the Marine Ministry Secretariat, 1886–1888 head of maritime surveys in Danish waters and in 1889–1898 director of the Chart-archive. In 1890 Wandel was appointed chairman of the commission for the survey of Danish waters and in 1895 chairman of the commission for geological and geographical studies in Greenland. In the period of 1901–1908 he became an official in the Defence Commission. In 1914–1927 he was the president of the Royal Danish Geographical Society.

Wandel was regularly deployed as commander, including in 1884 and 1897 commander of the Danish ironclad Helgoland, in 1895 and 1896 as leader of the Ingolf Expedition to Greenland and in 1898 as commander of the frigate HDMS Fyn to the Mediterranean.

== Honours ==
The Wandel Sea between Greenland and Svalbard, Cape Wandel and the Wandel Land nunatak in Greenland, were named after him.

== Works ==
- Maritime Warfare in the Danish and Norwegian waters 1807–14 (1915)
- Danmark og Barbareskerne 1746–1845 (1919)
- Nogle Livserindringer (1923)
- The Danish Commerce Attempt in the Orient in the Eighteenth Century (1927)

== See also ==
- Arctic exploration
- Cartographic expeditions to Greenland
