= Devil's Thumb (Queensland) =

Mountain in Queensland, Australia

Devils Thumb
- Majal Jimalji (Kuku-Yalanji)
- Location within Queensland

Highest point
- Elevation: 1,065 m (3,494 ft)
- Coordinates: 16.3862°S 145.2916°E

Geography
- Location: Mossman, Queensland, Australia

Devils Thumb (Kuku-Yalanji: Majal Jimalji) is a mountain located near Mossman within the Daintree National Park, Far North Queensland, Australia. Devils Thumb rises 1,065 metres (3,494 ft) above sea level. The Manjal Jamalji trail is a difficult 10.6-kilometre (6.6 mi) return trail to the peak which takes approximately eight hours.

== See also ==
- List of mountains of Australia
