= Kullorsuaq Island =

Island in Greenland

Kullorsuaq
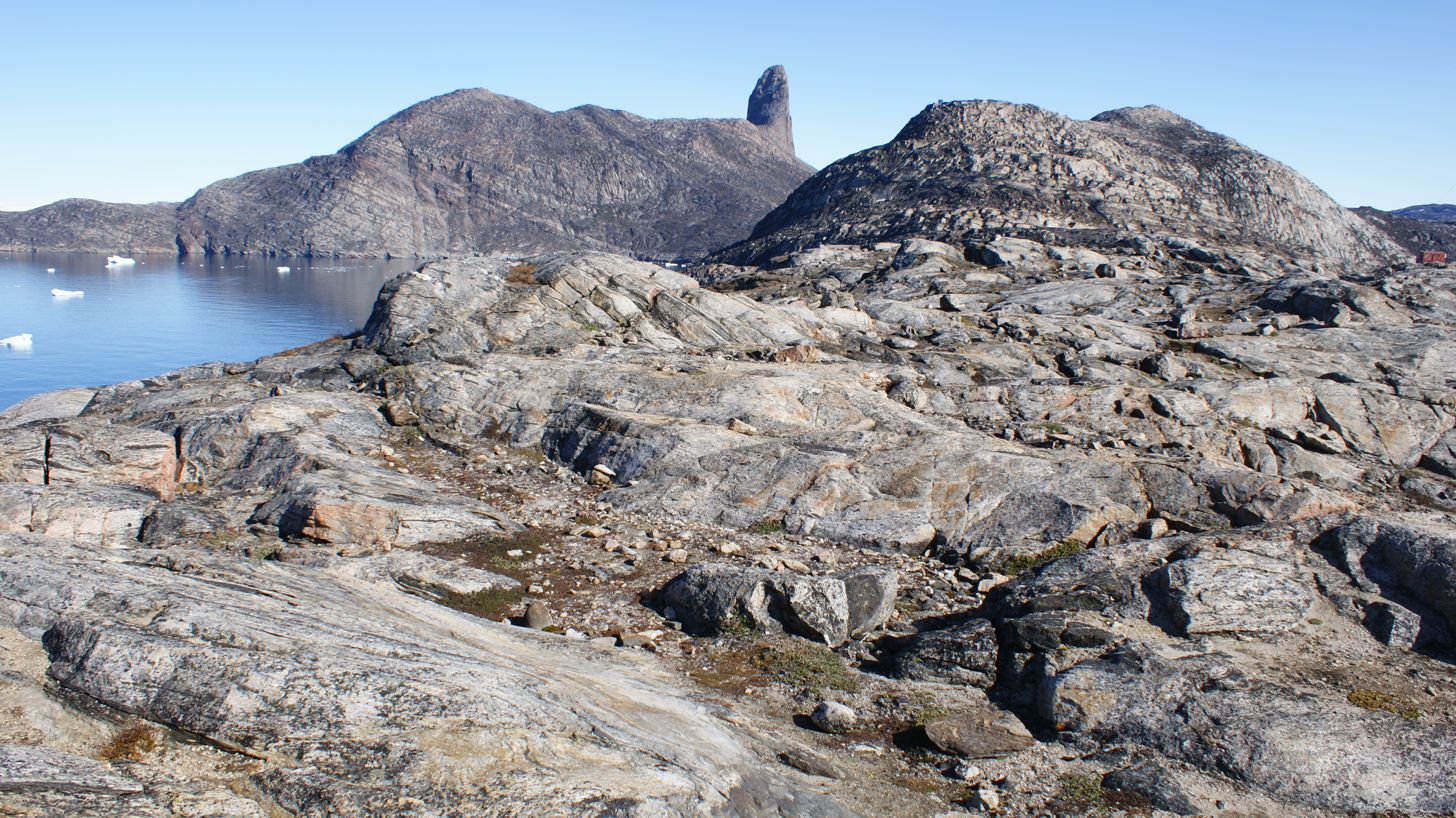
- Kullorsuaq Island

- Location within Greenland

Geography
- Location: Greenland
- Coordinates: 74°36′N 57°08′W
- Archipelago: Upernavik Archipelago

Administration
- Greenland
- Municipality: Avannaata

Kullorsuaq Island (old spelling: Kuvdlorssuaq) is an island in the Avannaata municipality in northwestern Greenland. The name of the island means "a big thumb" in the Greenlandic language.

== Geography ==
Part of the Upernavik Archipelago, Kullorsuaq Island is located in the southern part of Melville Bay, to the north of the much larger Kiatassuaq Island, and to the northwest of the mouth of Saqqarlersuup Sullua strait. A small Ikerasaa strait separates the island from the uninhabited Saqqarlersuaq Island in the east.

=== Devil's Thumb ===
The island is rocky throughout, with a large landmark pinnacle occupying its center, the 546 m (1,791 ft) Devil's Thumb, from which the island derives its name.

== Settlement ==
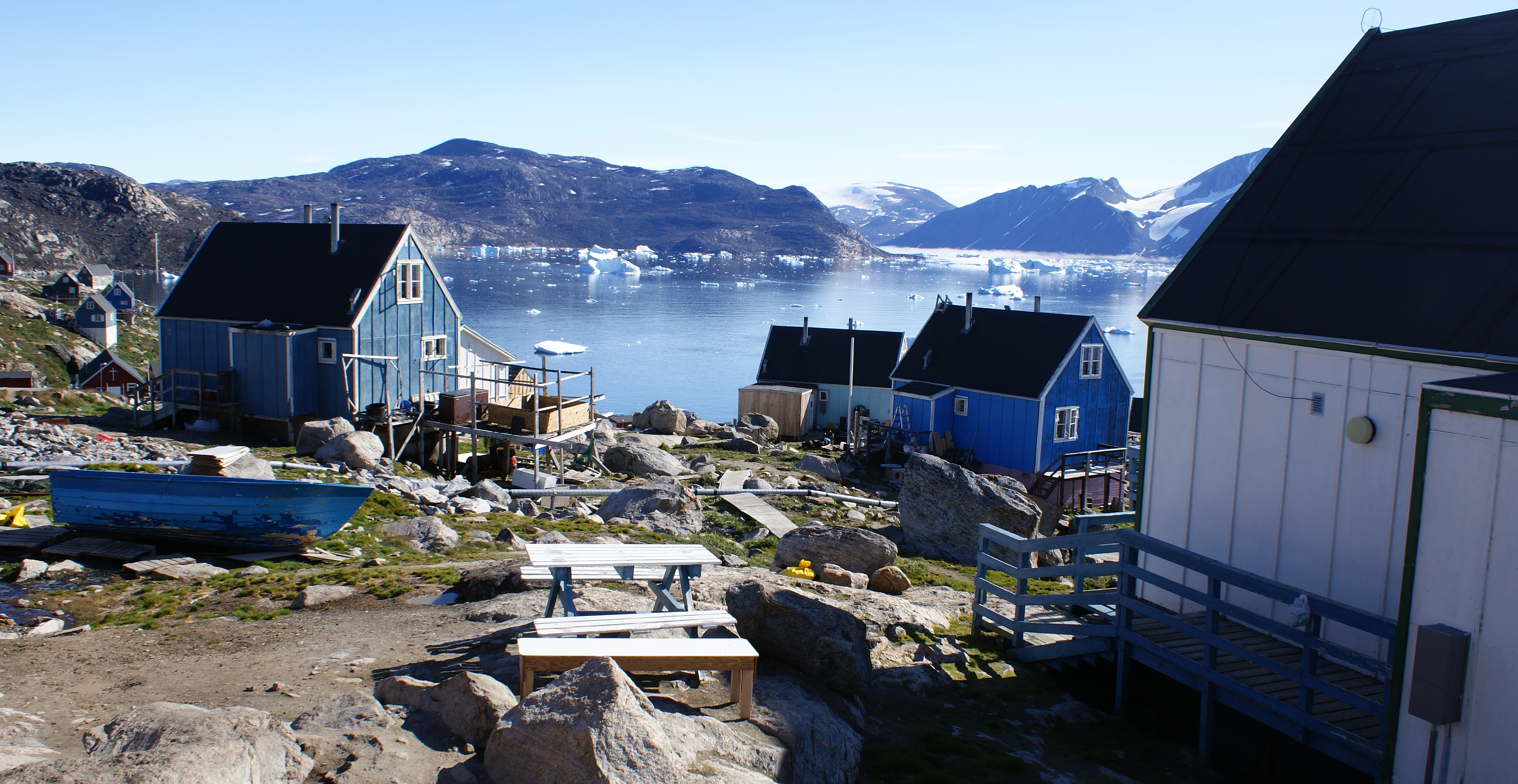
Neighboring Saqqarlersuaq Island seen from the Kullorsuaq settlement.

Home to the Kullorsuaq settlement, the island is one of the few inhabited islands in the Upernavik Archipelago, and the only such island in its northern part. The closest settlements are Nuussuaq, 53 km (33 mi) to the south, and Savissivik, 274 km (170 mi) to the northwest, on the other end of Melville Bay.

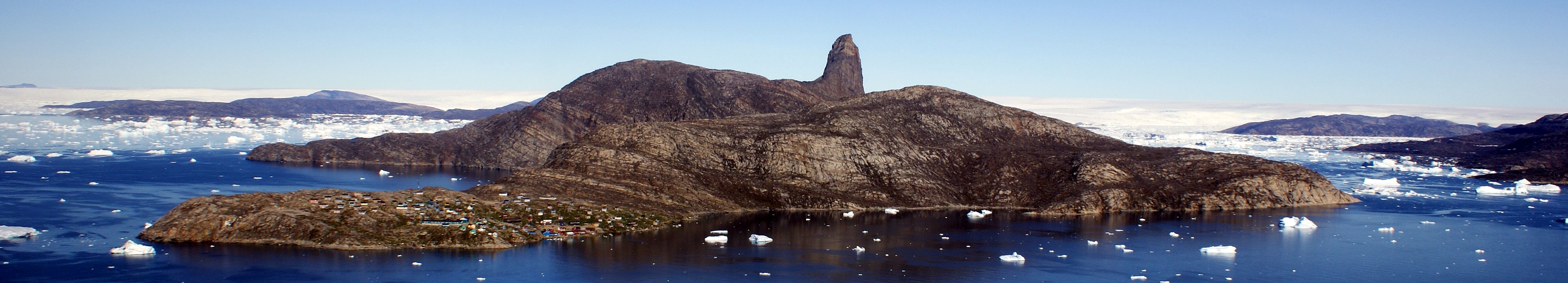
Aerial view of Kullorsuaq Island with the prominent Devil's Thumb pinnacle in the center.

== See also ==
- Melville Monument (Greenland)
