= Saqqarlersuaq Island =

Island in Avannaata, Greenland

Saqqarlersuaq
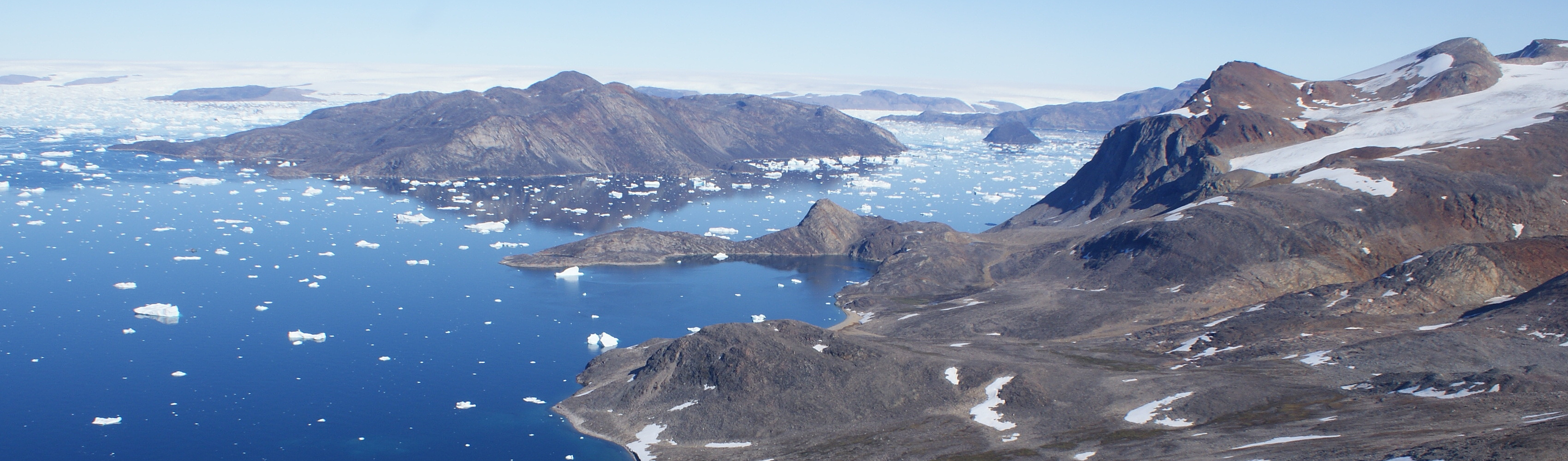
- Aerial view of Saqqarlersuaq Island (left) and Kiatassuaq Island (right)

- Location within Greenland

Geography
- Location: Greenland
- Coordinates: 74°35′N 56°56′W
- Archipelago: Upernavik Archipelago

Administration
- Greenland
- Municipality: Avannaata

Saqqarlersuaq Island (old spelling: Sarqardlerssuaq) is an uninhabited island in Avannaata municipality in northwestern Greenland. Part of the Upernavik Archipelago, Saqqarlersuaq Island is located in the southern part of Melville Bay.

== Geography ==
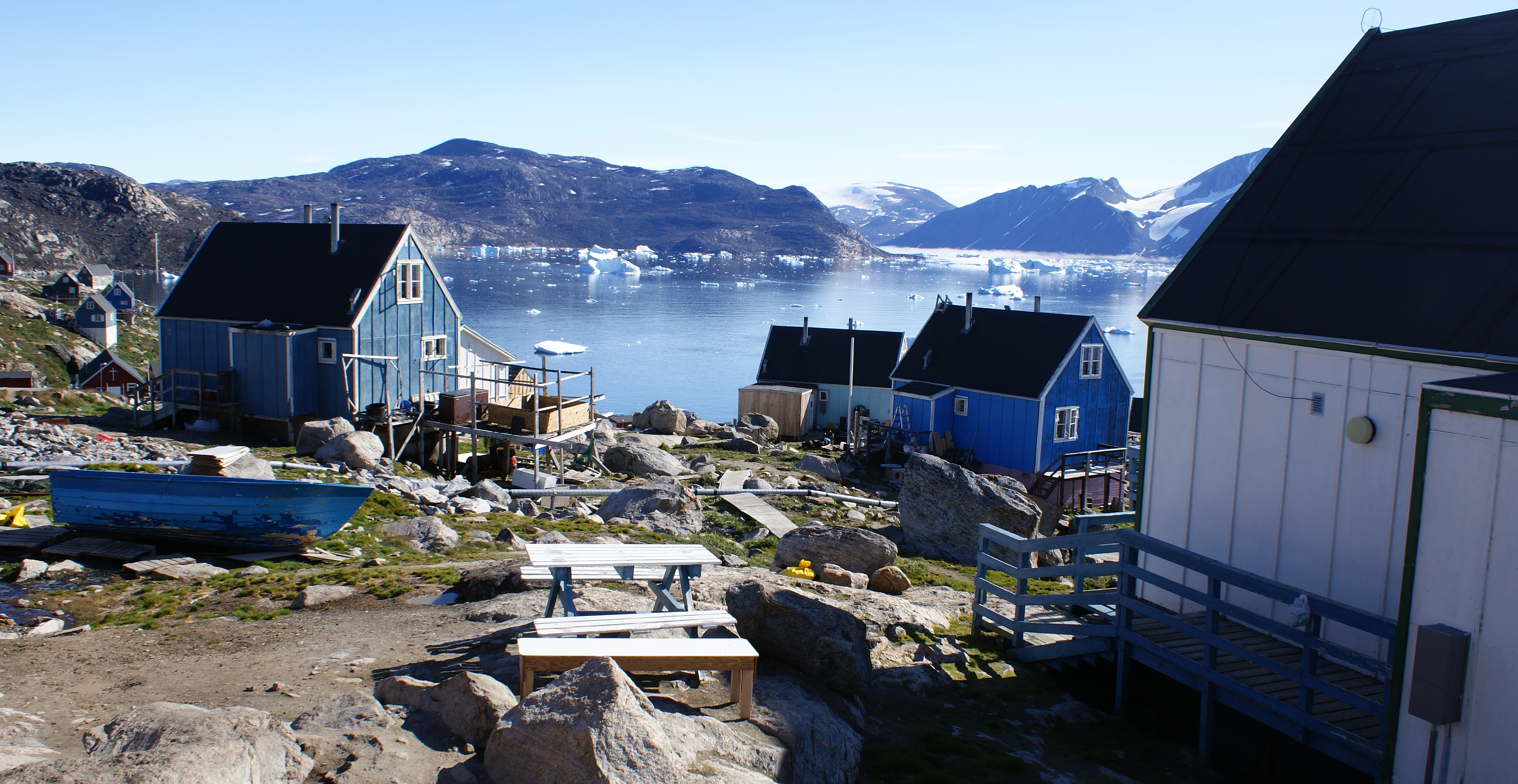
Saqqarlersuaq Island seen from the Kullorsuaq settlement.

In the south, Saqqarlersuaq Island is separated from the much larger Kiatassuaq Island by the 11 km (6.8 mi) Saqqarlersuup Sullua strait. The strait connects the open waters of Melville Bay in the west with the outlet of Alison Bay in the northeast.

A small Ikerasaa Strait separates the island from Kullorsuaq Island in the northwest, home to the Kullorsuaq settlement, the northernmost settlement in the archipelago.

The highest point on the island is an unnamed 583 m (1,913 ft) peak in the southern part of the island.
