= Melville Bay =

Bay in Avannaata, Greenland

- Melville Bugt
- Qimusseriarsuaq (Greenlandic)
- Location of Melville Bay in Northwest Greenland

- Location within Greenland
- Location: Arctic
- Coordinates: 75°45′N 61°00′W
- Ocean/sea sources: Baffin Bay
- Basin countries: Greenland
- Max. length: 300 km (190 mi)
- Max. width: 100 km (62 mi)
- Max. depth: 1,000 m (3,300 ft)
- Frozen: Between October and late July

Melville Bay (Greenlandic: Qimusseriarsuaq; Danish: Melville Bugt), is a large bay off the coast of northwestern Greenland. Located to the north of the Upernavik Archipelago, it opens to the south-west into Baffin Bay. Its Kalaallisut name, Qimusseriarsuaq, means "the great dog sledding place".

The bay was named after Robert Dundas, 2nd Viscount Melville, (1771 - 1851) head of the Admiralty.

== Geography ==
Melville Bay is delimited by Cape York in the northeast and Wilcox Head, the western promontory on Kiatassuaq Island in the south. Some islands of the Upernavik Archipelago are in the Melville Bay area, such as Kiatassuaq Island, Kullorsuaq Island, Saarlia Island and Saqqarlersuaq Island. Melville Bay is free of fast ice between mid August and the end of September on average. Navigation is dangerous as there are numerous icebergs in the bay throughout the year.

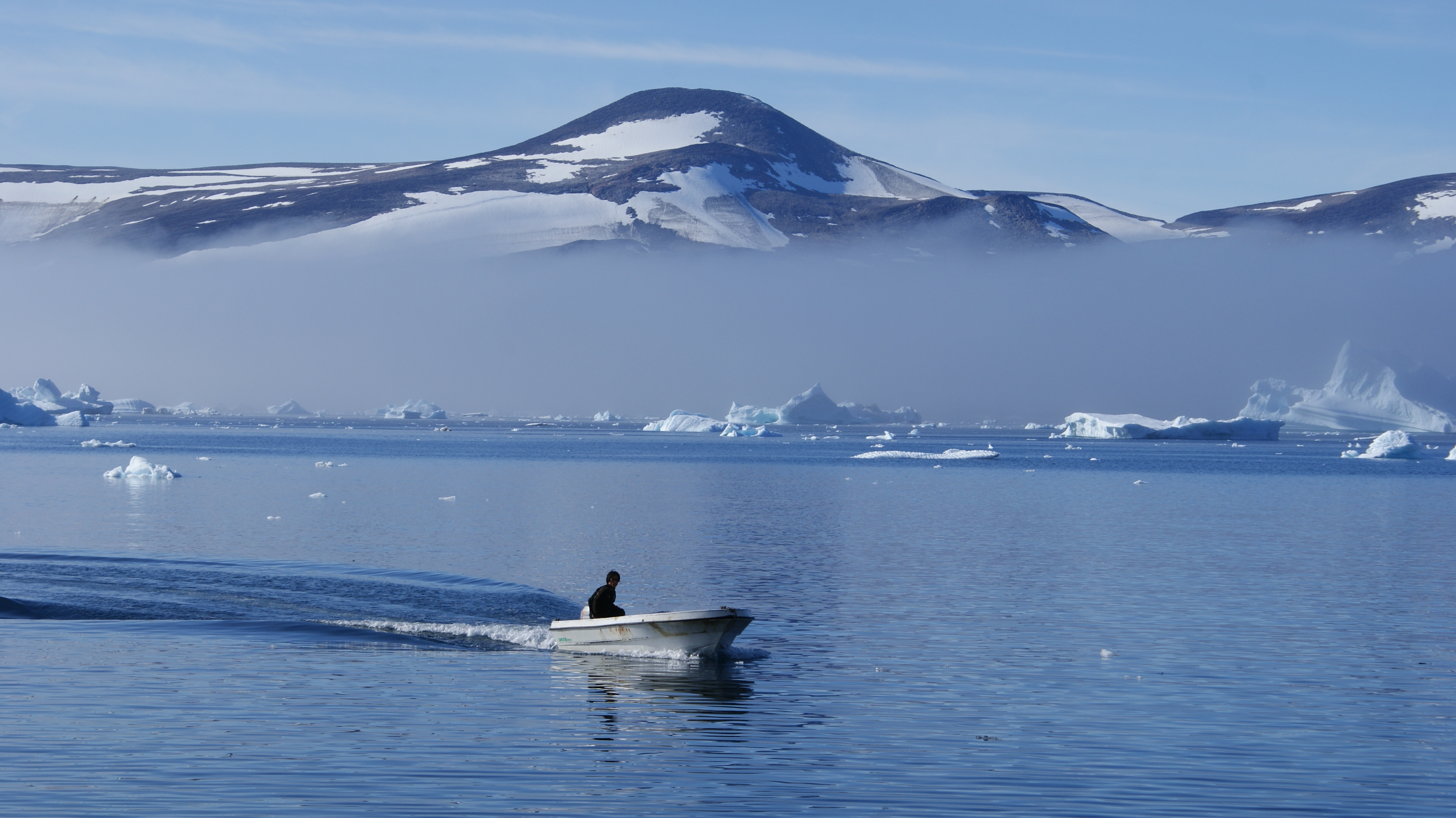
An Inuit hunting boat in southern Melville Bay. Late morning fog and icebergs in the background.

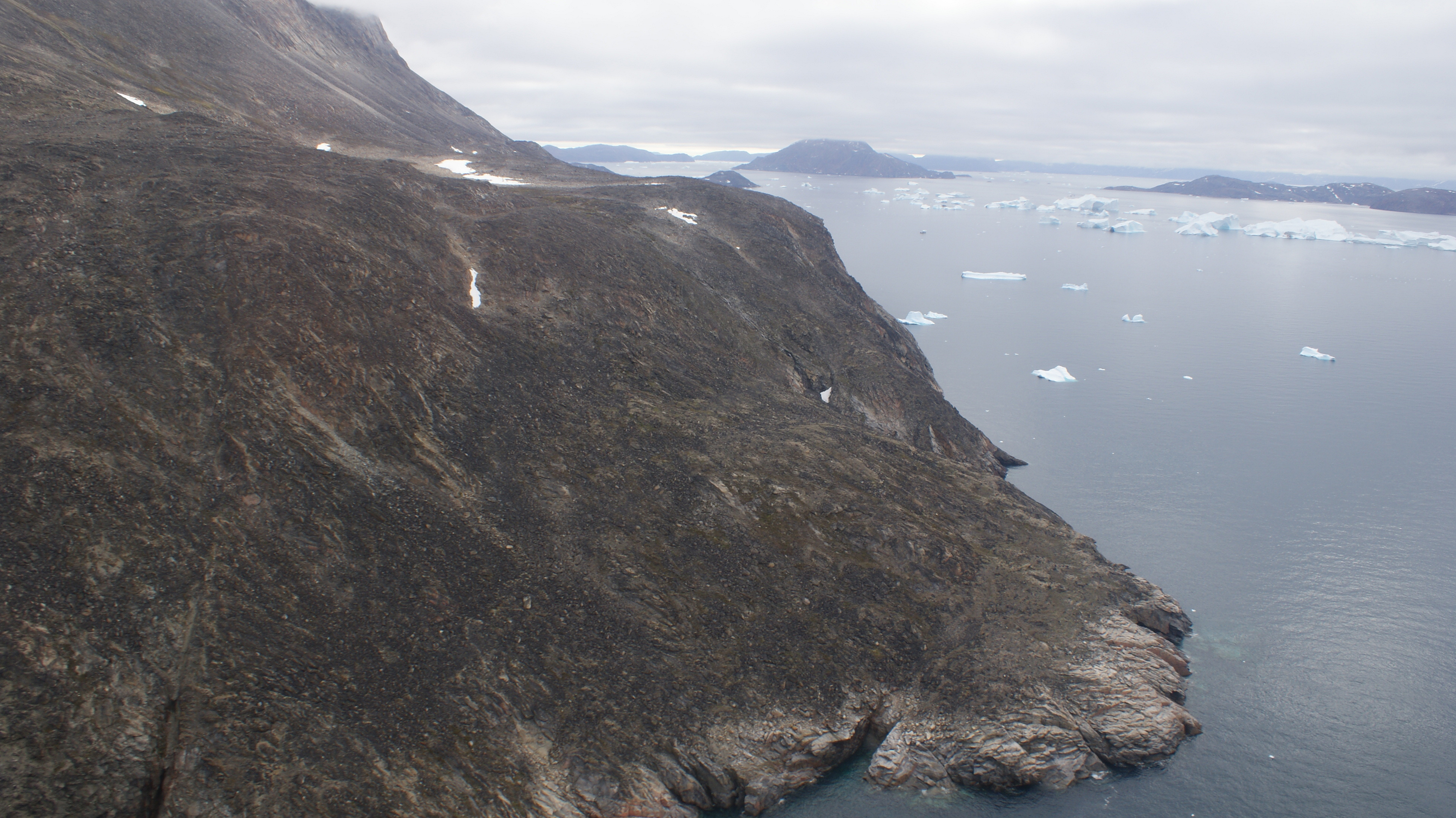
Aerial view of Wilcox Head

== History ==
In the 19th century Melville Bay was an important place for whaling fleets.

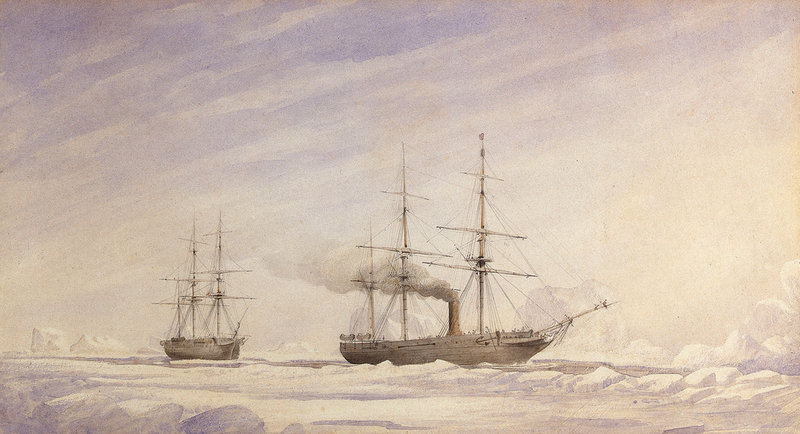
View of two ships in Melville Bay by Edward Augustus Inglefield.

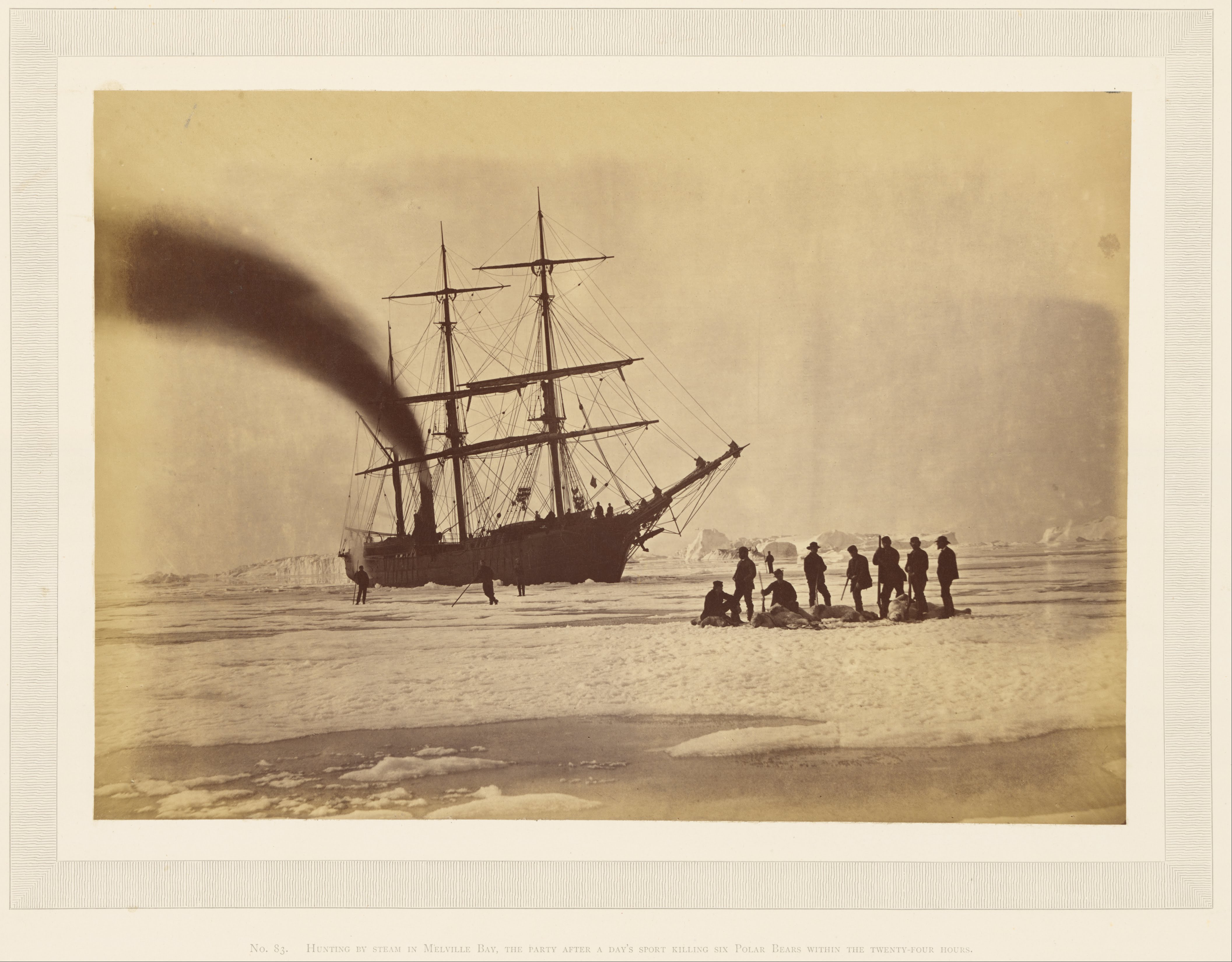
1869 photograph of a steamer and a party of hunters in Melville Bay.

== See also ==
- Cape York (Greenland)
- Wandel Land
