= Ikermiorsuaq Island =

Island in Avannaata, Greenland

Ikermiorsuaq
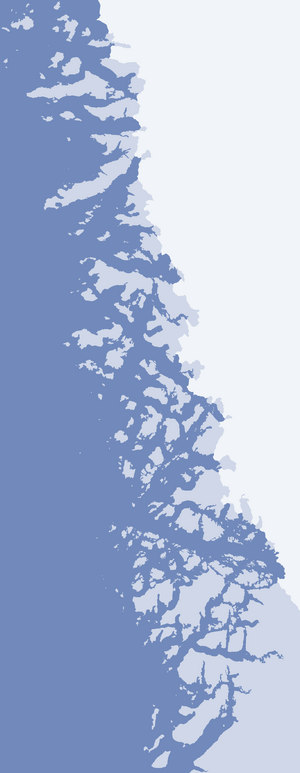
- Location within Upernavik Archipelago

Geography
- Location: Greenland
- Coordinates: 74°00′15″N 56°31′40″W
- Archipelago: Upernavik Archipelago

Administration
- Greenland
- Municipality: Avannaata

Ikermiorsuaq Island (formerly Ikermiorssuaq) is an uninhabited island in Avannaata municipality, northwestern Greenland.

== Geography ==
Ikermiorsuaq Island is located in the northern part of Upernavik Archipelago, in the center of Sugar Loaf Bay, an indentation of Baffin Bay, halfway between a chain of small islands off the southern coast of Nuussuaq Peninsula in the northwest, and Nasaussaq Island in the southeast, at the mouth of Nasaussap Saqqaa fjord.

== See also ==
- List of islands of Greenland
