= Itissaalik Island =

Island in Avannaata, Greenland

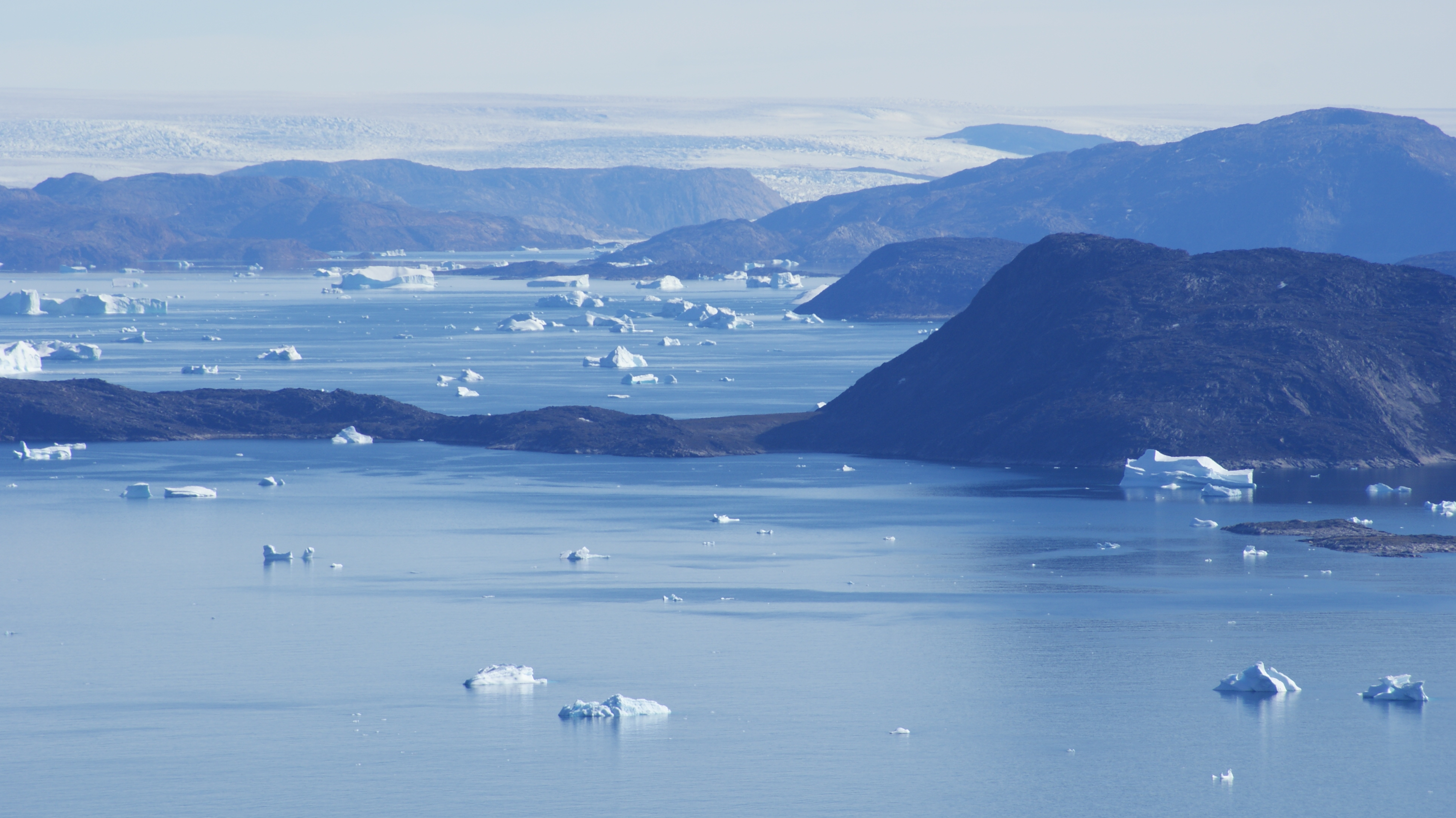
- Itissaalik Island

- Location within Greenland

Geography
- Location: Greenland
- Coordinates: 74°04′50″N 56°43′00″W
- Archipelago: Upernavik Archipelago

Administration
- Greenland
- Municipality: Avannaata

Itissaalik Island (old spelling: Itivsâlik) is a small, uninhabited island located in Avannaata municipality in northwestern Greenland.

== History ==
Itissaalik Island was inhabited, although not continuously. Between 1904 and 1909, a small settlement of the same name (also spelled Itussaalik) was established on the island. It was repopulated again in 1911, and finally abandoned in 1957, during the post-war consolidation phase in northwestern Greenland.

== Geography ==
Itissaalik Island is located in the northern part of Upernavik Archipelago, in the northern part of Sugar Loaf Bay, an indentation of Baffin Bay. The island is part of a chain of small islands off the southern coast of Nuussuaq Peninsula. Other islands in the chain include Sugar Loaf Island, Timilersua Island, and Saarlia to the southwest of Itissaalik − and Paornarqortuut and Inussulikassak to the northeast. The closest settlement is Nuussuaq, approximately 10 km (6.2 mi) to the west-north-west of the island.
