= Kittorsaq Island =

Island in Avannaata, Greenland

Kittorsaq
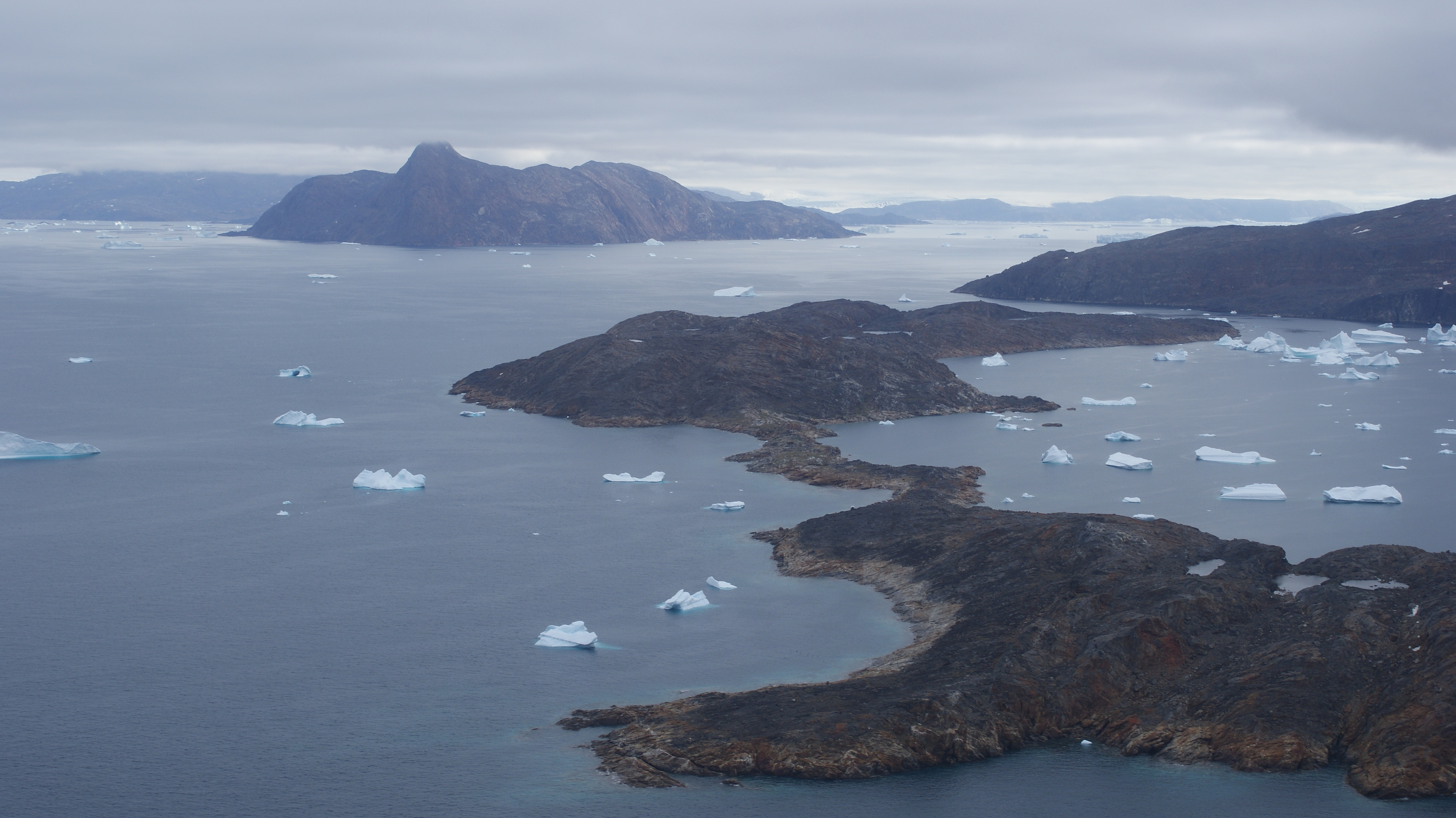
- Aerial view of Kittorsaq Island

- Location within Greenland

Geography
- Location: Greenland
- Coordinates: 73°55′30″N 56°46′30″W
- Archipelago: Upernavik Archipelago

Administration
- Greenland
- Municipality: Avannaata

Kittorsaq Island (old spelling: Kigtorsaq) is an uninhabited island in Avannaata municipality in northwestern Greenland. It is located in the northern part of Upernavik Archipelago.

== Geography ==
Kittorsaq Island is located in the north-central part of the Upernavik Archipelago, in the group between Kangerlussuaq Icefjord in the south, and Nuussuaq Peninsula in the north. Together with Qullikorsuit Island, it defines the southern boundary of the Sugar Loaf Bay.

The waters around the island are those of Baffin Bay in the west and south, and Sugar Loaf Bay in the north. The only other island in the vicinity of Kittorsaq is a much larger Qullikorsuit Island, from which it is separated by a narrow strait near the mouth of the Nasaussap Saqqaa fjord.

The island is hilly, but not mountainous, due to its narrowness and wormlike shape. The highest point is an unnamed hill of 151 m (495 ft). The island is sometimes used as a stopover on the marine route from Nuussuaq to Tasiusaq, and further south to Upernavik.
