= Timilersua Island =

Island in Avannaata, Greenland

Timilersua
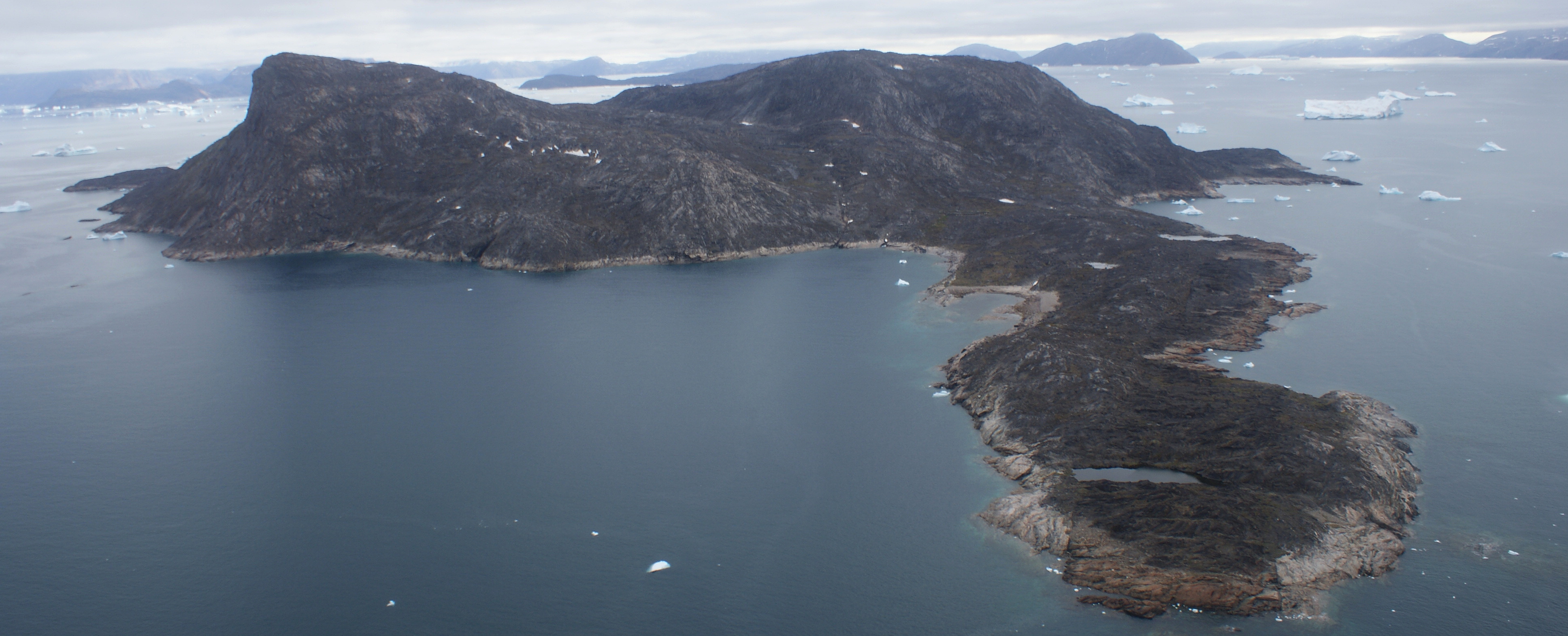
- Aerial view of Timilersua Island

- Location within Greenland

Geography
- Location: Greenland
- Coordinates: 74°01′10″N 56°51′00″W
- Archipelago: Upernavik Archipelago

Administration
- Greenland
- Municipality: Avannaata

Timilersua Island (old spelling: Timilerssua) is a small, uninhabited island in Avannaata municipality in northwestern Greenland.

== Geography ==
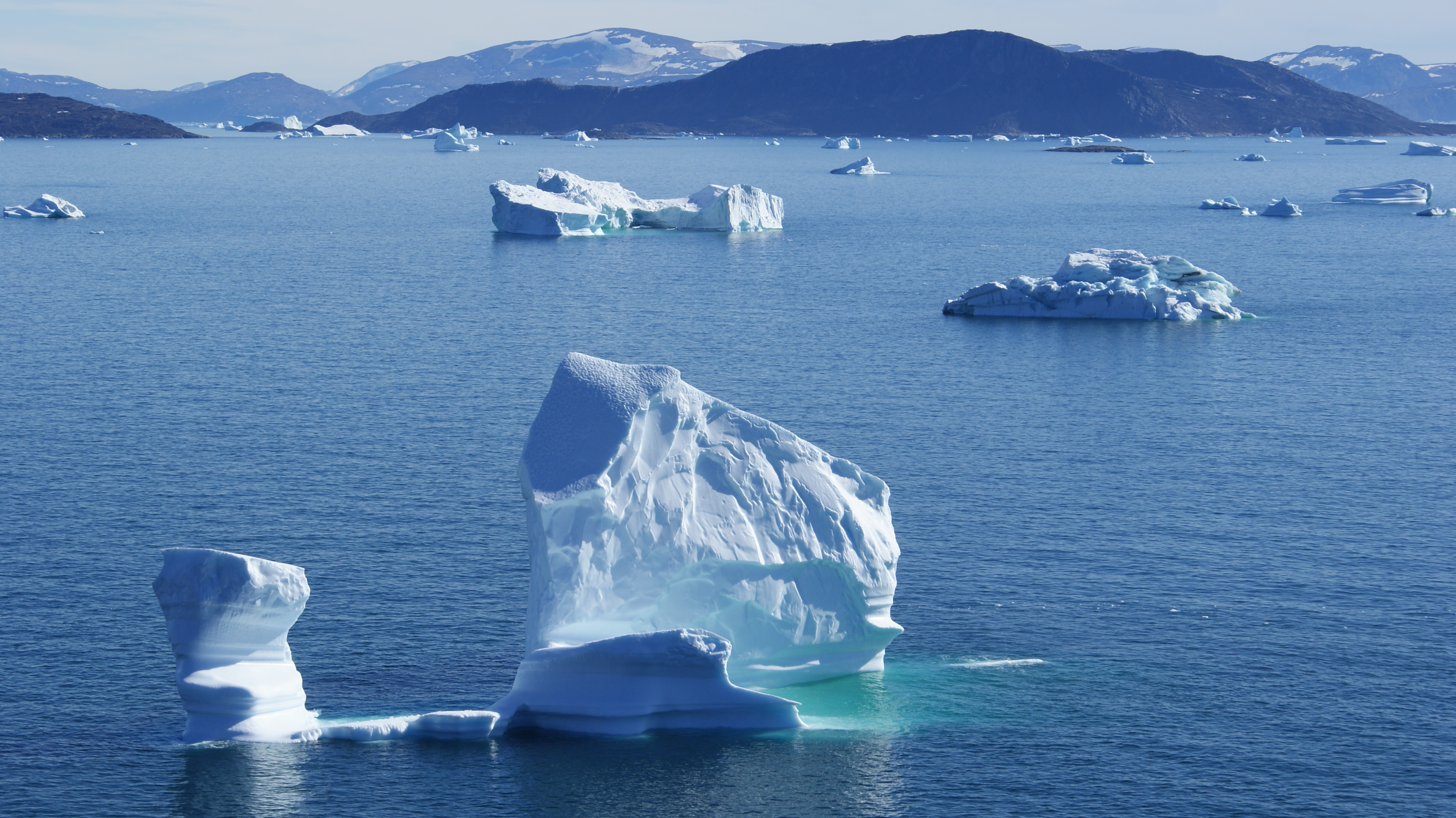
Timilersua Island and icebergs of Sugar Loaf Bay

Timilersua Island is located in the northern part of Upernavik Archipelago, in the northern part of Sugar Loaf Bay, an indentation of Baffin Bay. The island is part of a chain of small islands off the southern coast of Nuussuaq Peninsula. Other islands in the chain include Sugar Loaf Island, immediately to the west of Timilersua − and Saarlia, Paornarqortuut, Itissaalik Island and Inussulikassak to the northeast.

The closest settlement is Nuussuaq, approximately 11 km (6.8 mi) to the north-west-north of the island. The channel between Sugar Loaf Island and Timilersua lies on the old maritime route from Upernavik, through the islands of Tasiusaq Bay, to Kullorsuaq in Melville Bay.
