= Appaalissiorfiup Ikerasaa =

Strait in Avannaata, Greenland

Coordinates: 73°49′N 56°40′W

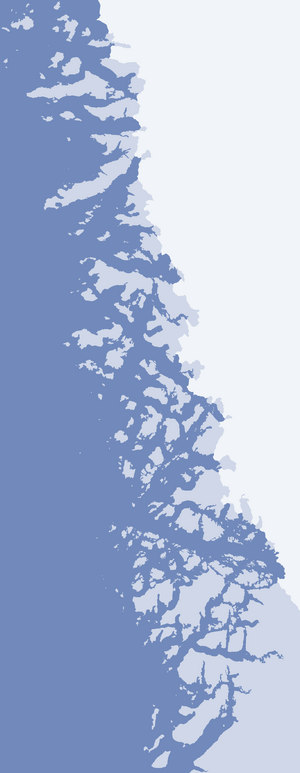
Appaalissiorfiup Ikerasaa Strait (Upernavik Archipelago)

Appaalissiorfiup Ikerasaa (old spelling: Agpâligsiorfiup Ikerasâ) is a strait in Avannaata municipality in northwestern Greenland.

== Geography ==
The strait is located at the northern end of Tasiusaq Bay. It separates Qullikorsuit Island in the northeast from Apparsuit Island in the southwest.

== History ==
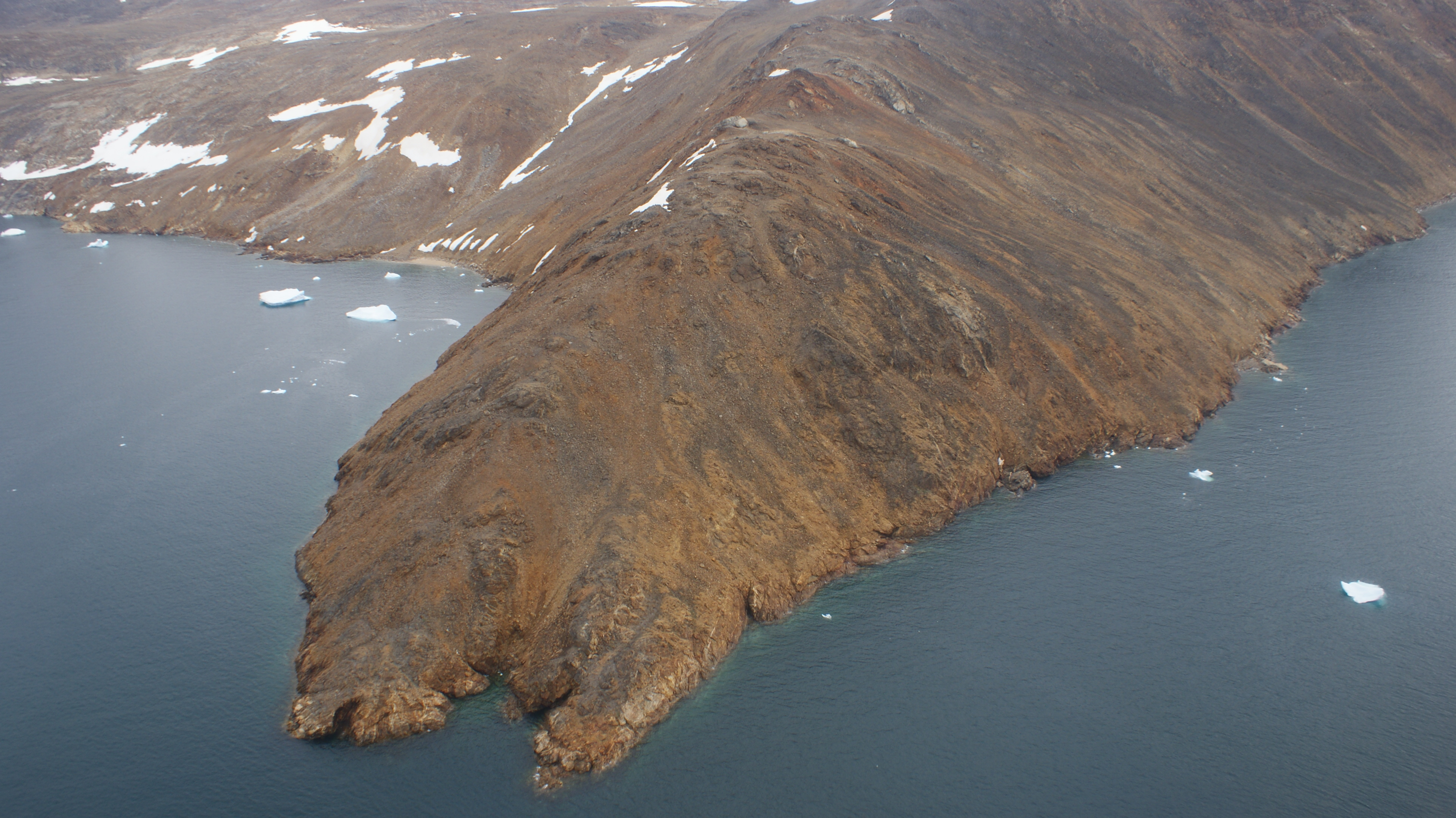
The shores of the strait: Qullikorsuit Island

The strait has been used as a waterway starting from 1875, when the northbound migrations of Greenlanders from Upernavik reached the islands north of Tasiusaq. Apparsuit Island is characteristic for its cliffs falling to the sea from all sides, providing shelter and a breeding ground for thousands of seabirds. Together with the cliffs of Qaarsorsuaq Island in the southern part of the archipelago, the number of birds reached millions. The cliffs were harvested for eggs from the start, and continue to be occasionally harvested to this day. The shore of the strait was inhabited between 1916, when the Appaalissiorfik settlement on Qullikorsuit Island was founded, and 1923, when it was abandoned.
