= Illulissuaq Peninsula =

Peninsula in Avannaata, Greenland

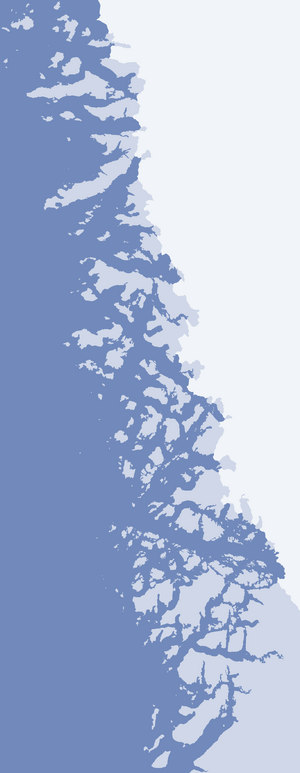
Illulissuaq Peninsula (Upernavik Archipelago)

Illulissuaq Peninsula (old spelling: Igdluligssuaq) is a mainland peninsula in northwestern Greenland, located in the northern part of Upernavik Archipelago

== History ==
The peninsula was inhabited between 1908 and 1973, although not continuously. The Illulik settlement, perched on the western cape of the peninsula, was very small, and consisted of only several families. Illulik was temporarily abandoned for the first time in 1909, due to relative isolation from other settlements of the region in early 20th century. The settlement was repopulated in 1914, and unlike small, insular villages in Inussulik Bay and Sugar Loaf Bay to the south, it survived the post-war consolidation phase in northwestern Greenland. It was permanently abandoned in 1973.

== Geography ==
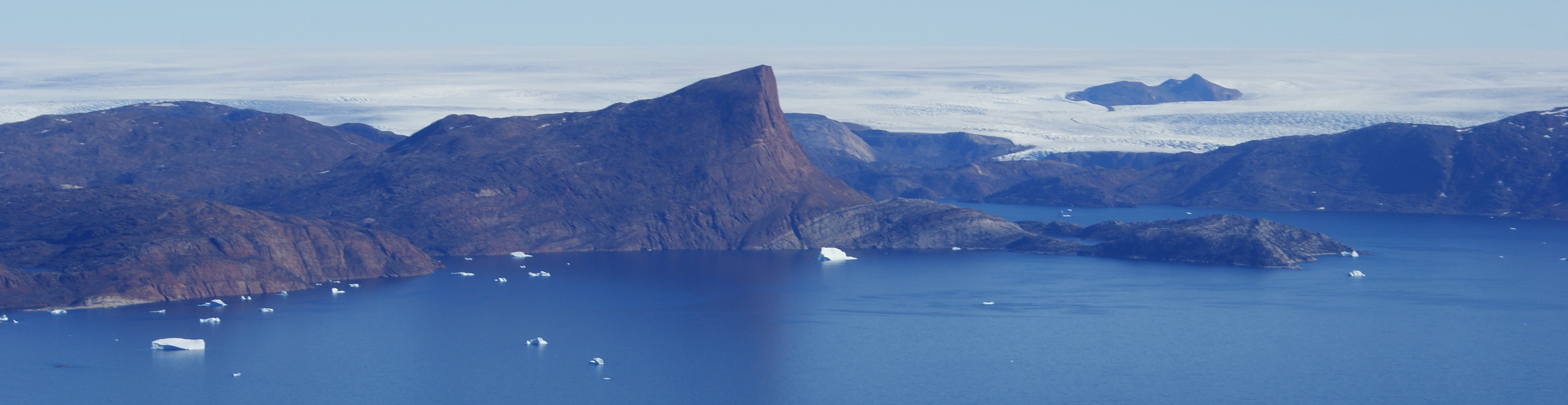
Aerial view of Illulissuaq Peninsula from Inussulik Bay, from the west.

The base of the peninsula, shared with the neighboring Nuussuaq Peninsula, is a nunatak located at 74°22′30″N 56°00′00″W, and rising to 280 m (920 ft) above the Greenland ice sheet (Greenlandic: Sermersuaq) reaching the sea level to the south and north of the nunatak. The peninsula has an east–west orientation, jutting westwards into Inussulik Bay.

In the south, Illulissuaq Peninsula is separated from Nuussuaq Peninsula by the Kangerluarsuk Fjord, an inlet of Inussulik Bay. The fjord nearly splits the peninsula into two halves, with the western half separated from the nunatak in the east by a low, narrow isthmus. The western half of the peninsula forks into two, with a small rocky child Paattorfik Peninsula, pointing southwestwards and bounding Kangerluarsuk from the northwest.

The peninsula is approximately 17.4 km (10.8 mi) long. It is mountainous, culminating in several summits, with the highest reaching 796 m (2,612 ft) on Paattofrik.

== Promontories ==
Name	Direction	Latitude N	Longitude W
Paatrorfiup Nuua	Southwestern Cape	74°17′20″	56°34′20″
Illulik	Western Cape	74°20′40″	56°43′00″
