= Itissaalik =

- Location within Greenland
- Coordinates: 74°03′17″N 56°44′35″W
- Sovereign state: Kingdom of Denmark
- Autonomous country: Greenland
- Municipality: Avannaata
- Founded: 1904
- Abandoned: 1957
- Time zone: UTC-03

Itissaalik (old spelling: Itivsâlik, also Itussaalik) is a former settlement in Avannaata municipality in northwestern Greenland. It was located in the northern part of Upernavik Archipelago, on the southern shore of Itissaalik Island, an island in Sugar Loaf Bay.

== History ==
Itissaalik was established in 1904, and temporarily depopulated five years later. It was repopulated again in 1911, and finally abandoned in 1957, during the post-war consolidation phase in northwestern Greenland, with the population moving to nearby Nuussuaq, and further to Kullorsuaq in Melville Bay.
