= Amitsorsuaq Island =

Island in Greenland

Amitsorsuaq
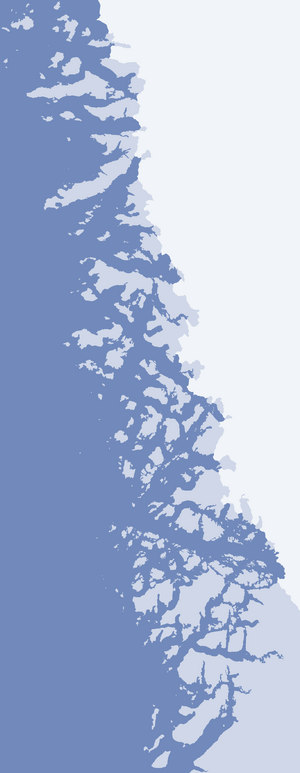
- Location within Upernavik Archipelago

Geography
- Location: Greenland
- Coordinates: 73°56′20″N 56°05′00″W
- Archipelago: Upernavik Archipelago
- Length: 8 km (5 mi)
- Width: 2.1 km (1.3 mi)

Administration
- Greenland
- Municipality: Avannaata

Amitsorsuaq Island is a small, uninhabited island in Avannaata municipality in northwestern Greenland.

== Geography ==
Amitsorsuaq Island is located in the north-central part of Upernavik Archipelago, in the group between Kangerlussuaq Icefjord in the south, and Nuussuaq Peninsula in the north.

Together with its sibling Nasaussaq Island, Amitsorsuaq Island separates Nasaussap Saqqaa in the south from the inner parts of Sugar Loaf Bay in the north. It is separated from an unnamed nunatak on the mainland of Greenland by the narrow and short Amitsorsuup Sullua strait. the Ussing Glacier drains the Greenland ice sheet immediately to the east of the southeastern cape of the island. The island is separated from Nasaussaq Island in the west by the small Ikerasakassak strait.

The highest point on the island is an unnamed, 424 m (1,391 ft) peak in the western part.

== See also ==
- List of islands of Greenland
