= Illulik =

- Location within Greenland
- Coordinates: 74°20′39″N 56°41′10″W
- Sovereign state: Kingdom of Denmark
- Autonomous country: Greenland
- Municipality: Avannaata
- Founded: 1908
- Abandoned: 1973
- Time zone: UTC-03

Illulik (old spelling: Igdlulik) is a former settlement in Avannaata municipality in northwestern Greenland.

== Geography ==
Illulik was located near the western cape of Illulissuaq Peninsula, a mainland peninsula jutting off the mainland of Greenland into central Inussulik Bay, a bay in the northern part of Upernavik Archipelago.

== Climate ==
It is an average negative in degrees Celsius.

== History ==
The settlement was very small, consisting of several families. It was temporarily abandoned for the first time in 1909, due to relative isolation from other settlements of the region in early 20th century. The settlement was repopulated in 1914, and unlike small, insular villages in Inussulik Bay and Sugar Loaf Bay to the south, it survived the post-war consolidation phase in northwestern Greenland. It was permanently abandoned in 1973.
