= Nuussuup Kangia =

Fjord in Greenland

Coordinates: 74°08′N 56°30′W

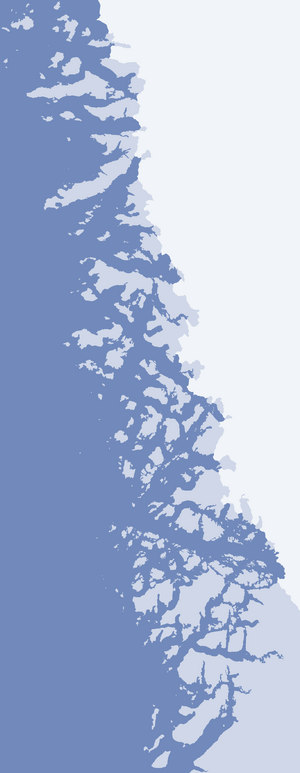
Nuussuup Kangia (Upernavik Archipelago)

Nuussuup Kangia (old spelling: Nûgssûp Kangia, Danish: Ryder Isfjord) is a fjord in northwestern Greenland, located at the northern end of Upernavik Archipelago.

== Geography ==
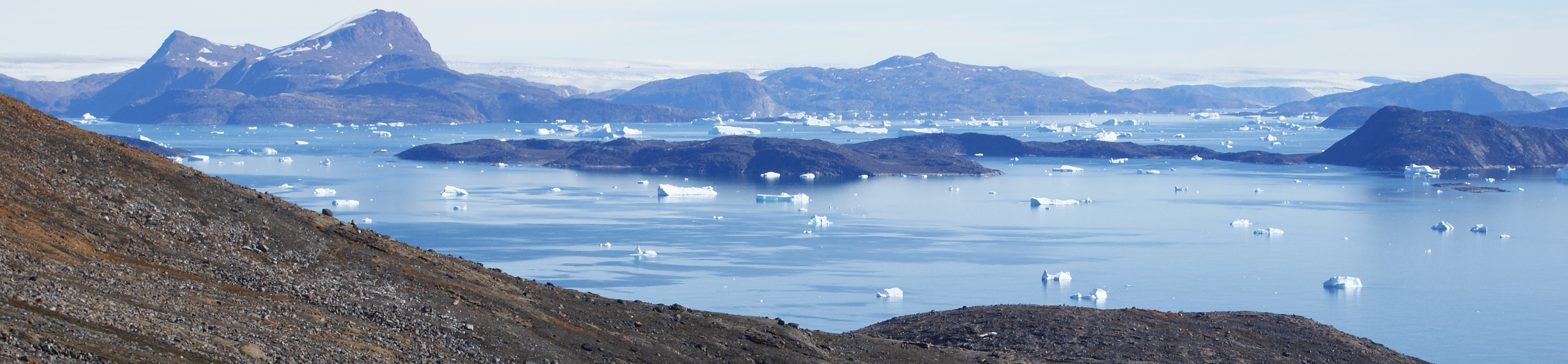
Nuussuup Kangia and small islands of Inussulik Bay

Cornell Glacier drains the Greenland ice sheet into the head of Nuussuup Kangia, to the east of the base of Nuussuaq Peninsula. The fjord is an inlet of Sugar Loaf Bay, flowing southwestward between Nuussuaq Peninsula in the northwest, and the Anoritooq nunatak on the mainland of Greenland in the east.
