= Illoorfik Island =

Uninhabited island in northwestern Greenland

Illoorfik
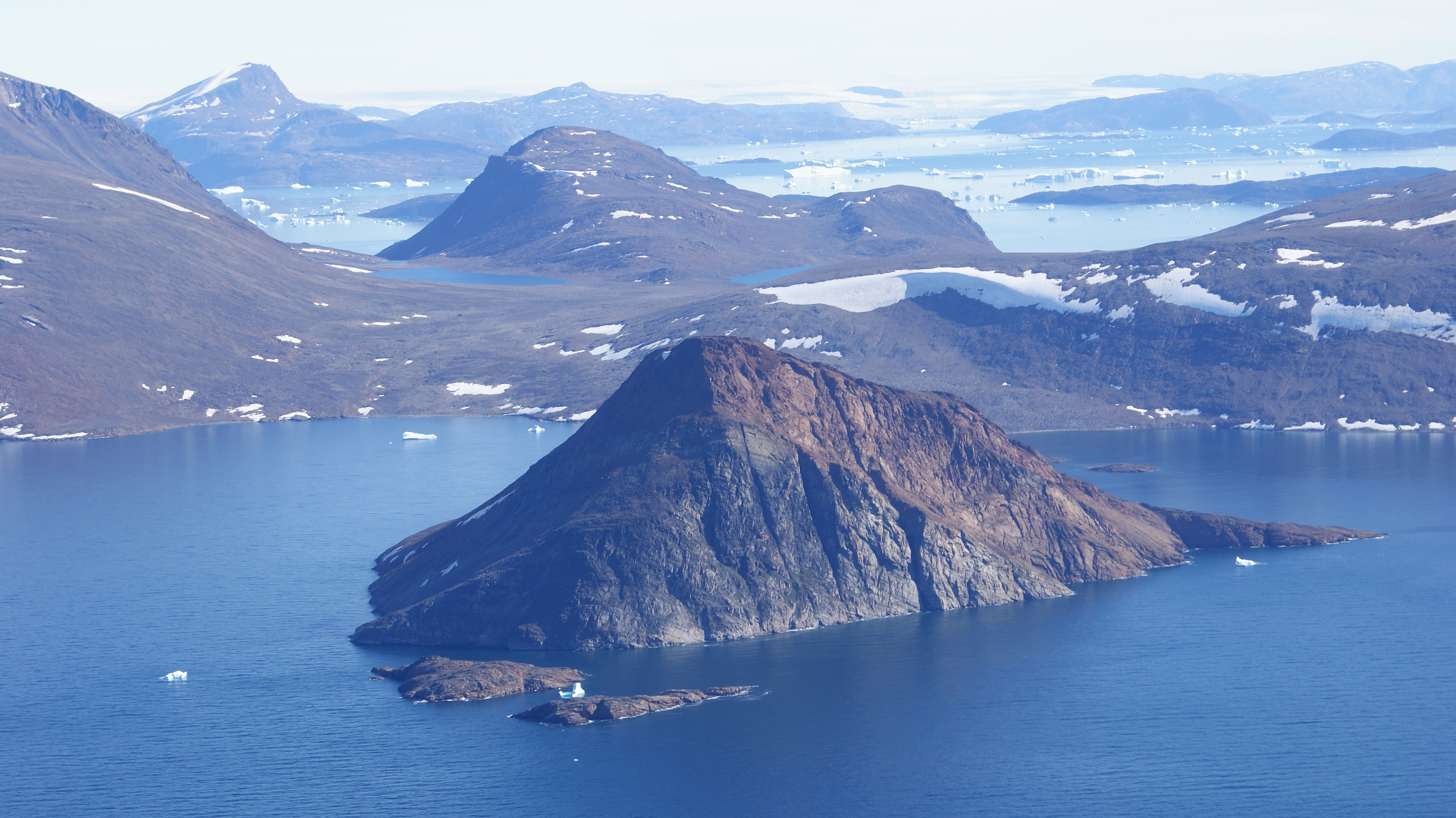
- Aerial view of Illorfik Island off Nuussuaq Peninsula

- Location within Greenland

Geography
- Location: Greenland
- Coordinates: 74°10′50″N 57°01′30″W
- Archipelago: Upernavik Archipelago

Administration
- Greenland
- Municipality: Avannaata

Illoorfik Island (old spelling: Igdlôrfik) is a small, uninhabited island in Avannaata municipality in northwestern Greenland. The island is a single flooded mountain of 341 m (1,119 ft).

== Geography ==
Illoorfik Island is located in the southern part of Inussulik Bay, just off the northern coast of Nuussuaq Peninsula, in the northern part of Upernavik Archipelago. The closest settlement is Nuussuaq, approximately 7.5 km (4.7 mi) to the southwest of the island, on the other side of Nuussuaq Peninsula.
