= Nasaussap Saqqaa =

Fjord in Greenland

- Ussing Icefjord
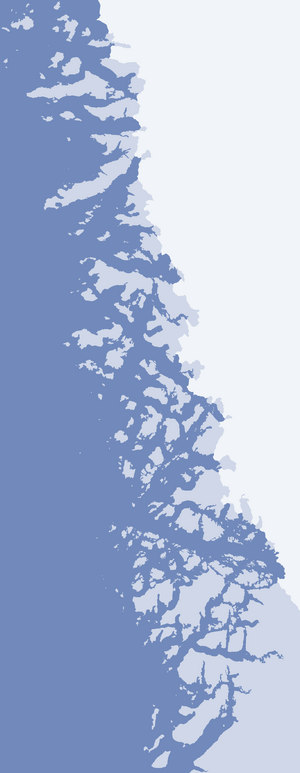
- Nasaussap Saqqaa (Upernavik Archipelago)
- Location: Upernavik Archipelago
- Coordinates: 73°54′N 56°05′W
- Ocean/sea sources: Baffin Bay
- Basin countries: Greenland
- Max. length: 29.8 km (18.5 mi)

Nasaussap Saqqaa (old spelling: Nasaussap Sarqâ, Danish: Ussing Isfjord) is a fjord in Avannaata municipality in northwestern Greenland.

== Geography ==
The 29.8 km (18.5 mi) long fjord is an inlet of Sugar Loaf Bay, flowing to the west-northwest between Qullikorsuit Island in the southwest, and the Amitsorsuaq and Nasaussaq islands in the north. The Ussing Glacier or Ussing Bræer Glacier drains the Greenland ice sheet into the head of the fjord. The shores of Nasaussap Saqqaa are uninhabited; the closest settlement is Nuussuaq on a peninsula of the same name, 26.5 km (16.5 mi) to the northwest of the fjord mouth.
