= Nasaussaq Island =

Island in Avannaata, Greenland

Nasaussaq
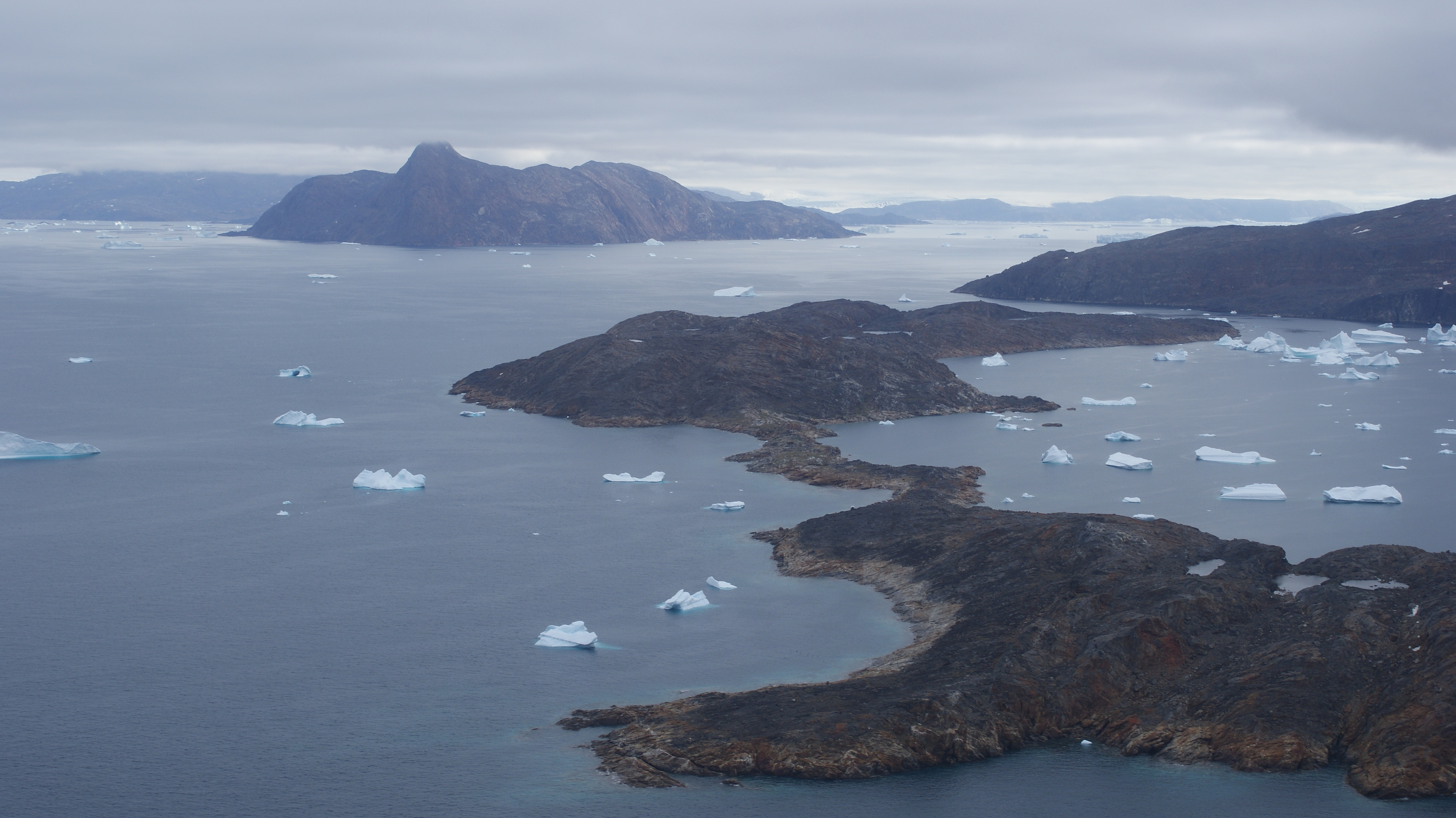
- Aerial view of Kittorsaq Island (front) and Nasaussaq Island (back)

- Location within Greenland

Geography
- Location: Greenland
- Coordinates: 73°56′20″N 56°19′00″W
- Archipelago: Upernavik Archipelago

Administration
- Greenland
- Municipality: Avannaata

Nasaussaq Island is a small, uninhabited island in Avannaata municipality in northwestern Greenland.

== Geography ==
Nasaussaq Island is located in the north-central part of Upernavik Archipelago, in the inner part of Sugar Loaf Bay, an indentation of Baffin Bay, at the mouth of Nasaussap Saqqaa fjord. In the south, the fjord separates the island and its sibling Amitsorsuaq Island from Qullikorsuit Island, one of the larger islands in the archipelago. Nasaussaq and Amitsorsuaq are separated by the small Ikerasakassak strait. The highest point on the island is an unnamed, 420 m (1,380 ft) peak in the center of the island.
