= Anoritooq =

Nunatak in Avannaata, Greenland

Coordinates: 74°06′58″N 56°00′00″W

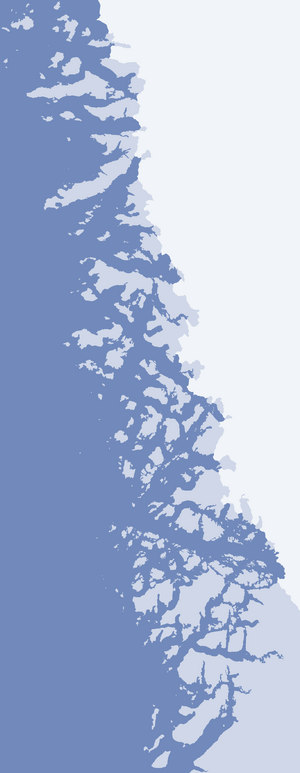
Anoritooq (Upernavik Archipelago)

Anoritooq (old spelling: Anoritôq) is a nunatak (Greenlandic: nunataq) in Avannaata municipality in northwestern Greenland.

== Geography ==
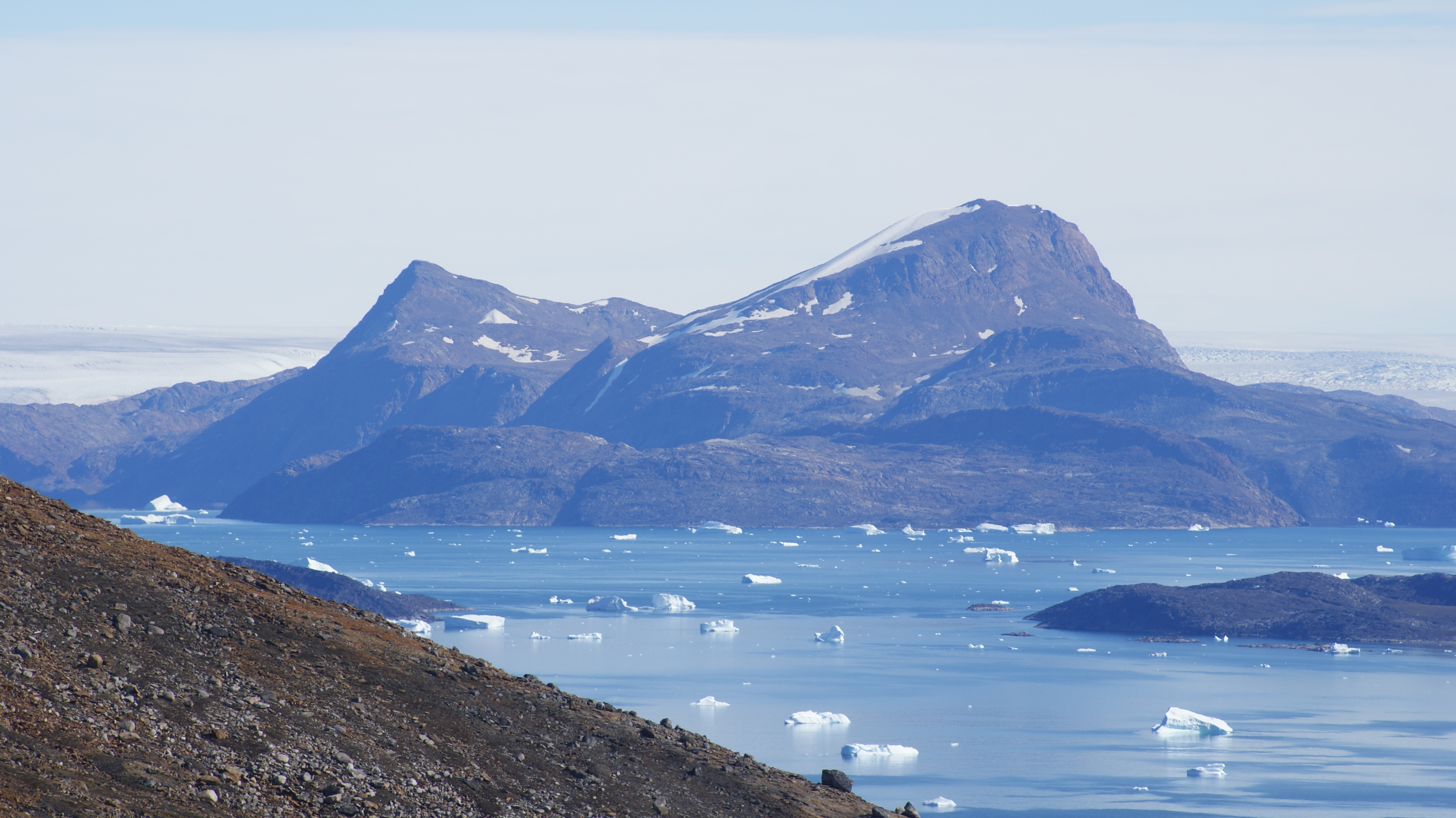
Anoritooq seen from Nuussuaq Peninsula, from the west

Anoritooq is located on the mainland of Greenland in the northern part of Upernavik Archipelago. To the north, Greenland icesheet drains into Sugar Loaf Bay via Cornell Glacier separating it from the base of Nuussuaq Peninsula.

The nunatak has several summits, with the highest reaching 1,108 m (3,635 ft). Due to the glacial retreat, another nunatak, Orsugissap Qaqqarsua, culminating in an 800 m (2,600 ft) summit, is now conjoint with Anoritooq.
