= Kangerluarsuk Fjord =

Fjord in Greenland

Coordinates: 74°17′N 56°27′W

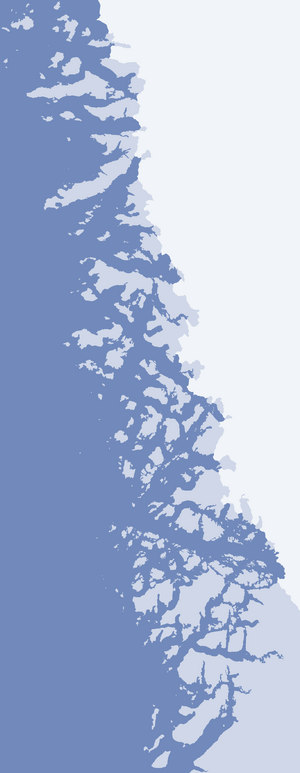
Kangerluarsuk Fjord (Upernavik Archipelago)

Kangerluarsuk Fjord (old spelling: Kangerdluarssuk) is a fjord in northwestern Greenland, located at the northern end of Upernavik Archipelago.

== Geography ==
The fjord is an inner inlet of Inussulik Bay, located in its southeastern corner. It separates Illulissuaq Peninsula in the north from Nuussuaq Peninsula in the southeast. The fjord nearly splits Illulissuaq Peninsula into two halves, with the western half separated from the nunatak in the east by a low, narrow isthmus. The western half of the peninsula forks into two, with a small rocky child Paattorfik Peninsula, pointing southwestwards and bounding Kangerluarsuk from the northwest.
