= Cornell Glacier =

Glacier in Greenland

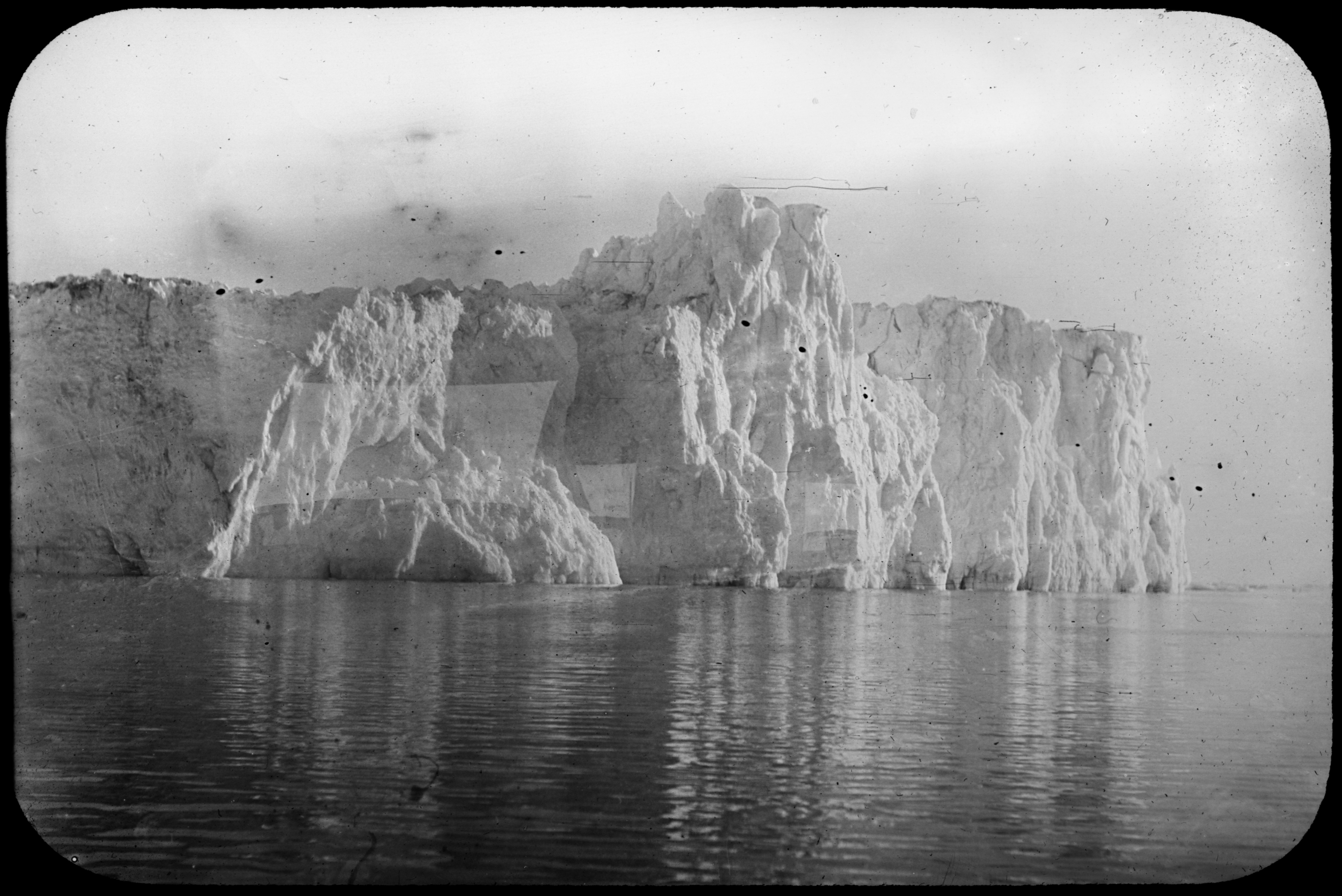
- Sea face
- Interactive map of Cornell Glacier
- Location: Upernavik Archipelago, Greenland
- Coordinates: 74°14′N 56°00′W
- Terminus: Nuussuup Kangia

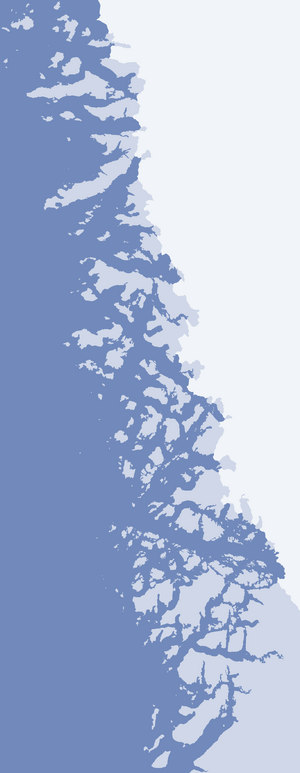
Cornell Glacier (Upernavik Archipelago)

Cornell Glacier (Greenlandic: Ikissuup Sermersua, old spelling: Ikigssûp Sermerssua, Danish: Cornell Gletscher) is a tidewater glacier in Avannaata municipality on the northwestern shore of Greenland. It drains the Greenland ice sheet westwards into Nuussuup Kangia, a fjord inlet of Sugar Loaf Bay, to the east of the base of Nuussuaq Peninsula.
