= Orsugissap Qaqqarsua =

Nunatak in Avannaata, Greenland

Coordinates: 74°04′02″N 56°07′50″W

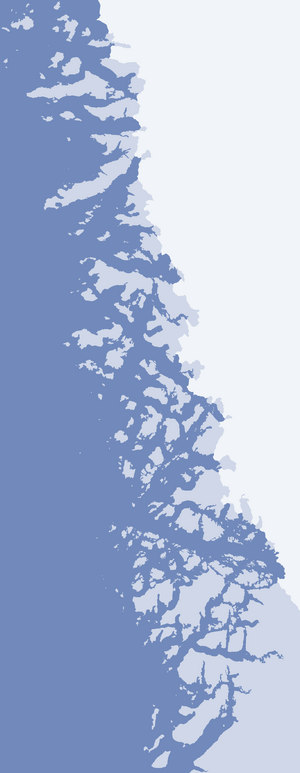
Orsugissap Qaqqarsua (Upernavik Archipelago)

Orsugissap Qaqqarsua (old spelling: Orssugissap Qaqqarssua) is a nunatak (Greenlandic: nunataq) of the Greenland ice sheet in Avannaata municipality in northwestern Greenland.

== Geography ==
Orsugissap Qaqqarsua (800 m (2,600 ft)) is located on the mainland of Greenland in the northern part of Upernavik Archipelago. Due to the glacial retreat, it is now conjoint in the north with Anoritooq, a 1,108 m (3,635 ft) nunatak. To the west and south, the nunatak is surrounded by the waters of Sugar Loaf Bay, and its innermost inlets, the largest of which is Niaqornarsuup Iterlaa in the south.
