= Qullikorsuit Island =

Island in Greenland

Qullikorsuit
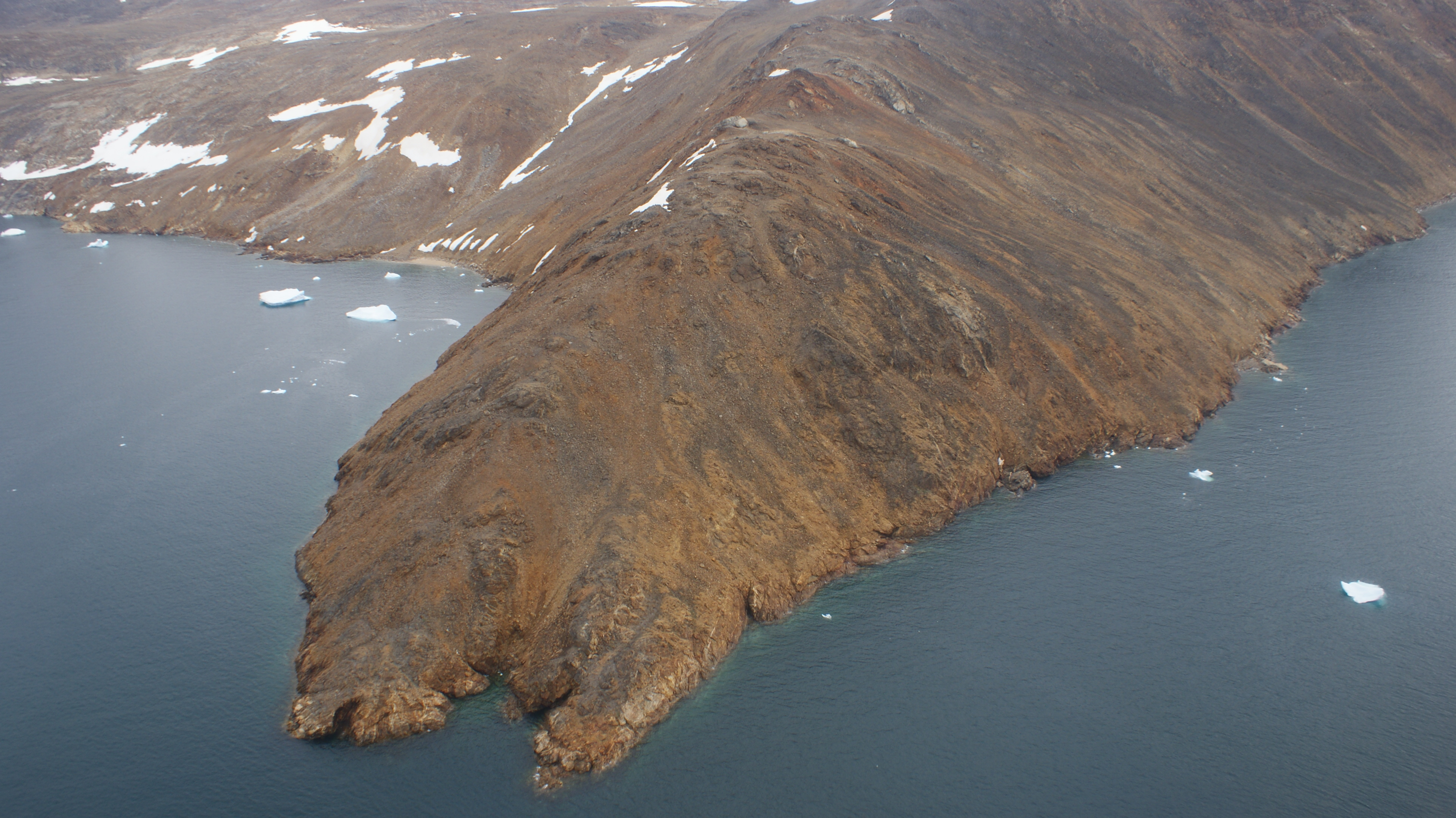
- Aerial view of the southwestern shore of Qullikorsuit Island

- Location within Greenland

Geography
- Location: Greenland
- Coordinates: 73°52′N 56°20′W
- Archipelago: Upernavik Archipelago
- Area: 204 km^{2} (79 sq mi)
- Coastline: 89.3 km (55.49 mi)

Administration
- Greenland
- Municipality: Avannaata

Qullikorsuit Island (old spelling: Qutdlikorssuit) is an uninhabited island in Avannaata municipality in northwestern Greenland. It is located in the northern part of Upernavik Archipelago.

== History ==
Qullikorsuit Island was inhabited between 1916, when the Appaalissiorfik settlement was founded, and 1923, when it was abandoned. Appaalissiorfik was perched on the southwestern cape of the island, on the shores of the Appaalissiorfiup Ikerasaa strait.

== Geography ==
=== Location within the archipelago ===
Qullikorsuit Island is located in the north-central part of Upernavik Archipelago, in the group between Kangerlussuaq Icefjord in the south, and Nuussuaq Peninsula in the north. The island defines the southern boundary of the Sugar Loaf Bay.

The island is the largest within the group, and is separated from the mainland of Greenland and smaller islands by narrow straits: from the unnamed nunataq on the mainland in the east by the narrow Ikerasassuaq strait, from the smaller, U-shaped Paornivik Island in the southeast by Paarniviup Tunua strait, from Mernoq Island in the south by the Mernup Tunua strait, and from Apparsuit Island by the Appaalissiorfiup Ikerasaa strait. The latter is an important waterway trail followed by the boats between Upernavik, the only town in the region, and smaller settlements in the north: Nuussuaq and Kullorsuaq. The neighboring Kittorsaq Island to the northwest is sometimes used as a stopover on the marine route from Nuussuaq to Tasiusaq, and further south to Upernavik.

=== Topography ===
The island is mountainous throughout. At 822 m (2,697 ft), the Sullaussartooq mountain is the highest point on the island, with the top of the ridge permanently glaciated.

=== Coastline ===
The coastline of the island is generally undeveloped, despite two distinct peninsulas and shallow, unnamed bays in the south.

==== Promontories ====
Name	Direction	Latitude N	Longitude W
Ujarassuit	Northern Cape	73°55′34″	56°35′45″
(none)	Southern Cape	73°46′50″	56°16′20″
Appaalissiorfik	Southwestern Cape	73°48′30″	56°35′00″
Saffioorsuaq	Western Cape	73°52′47″	56°44′12″

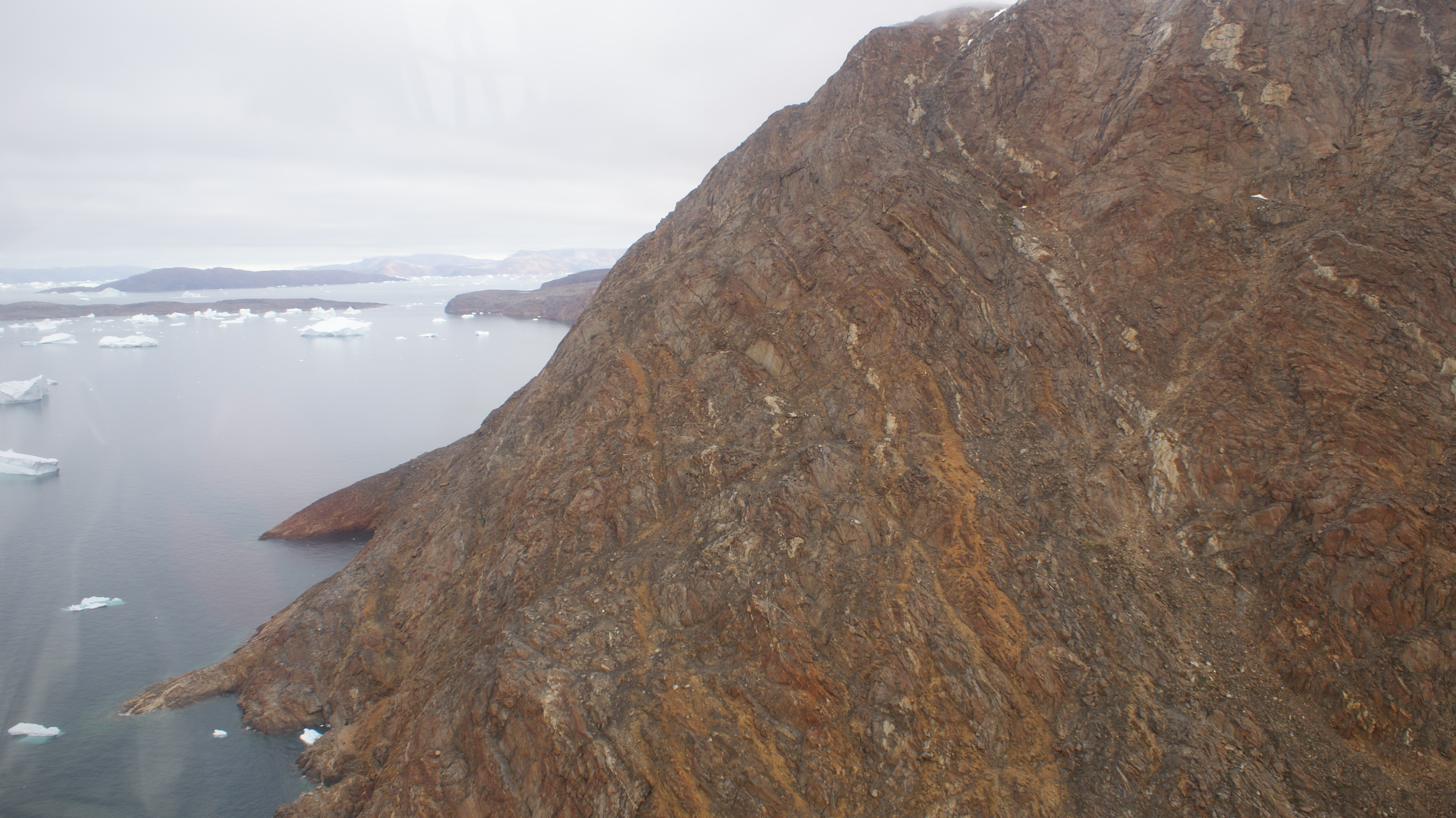
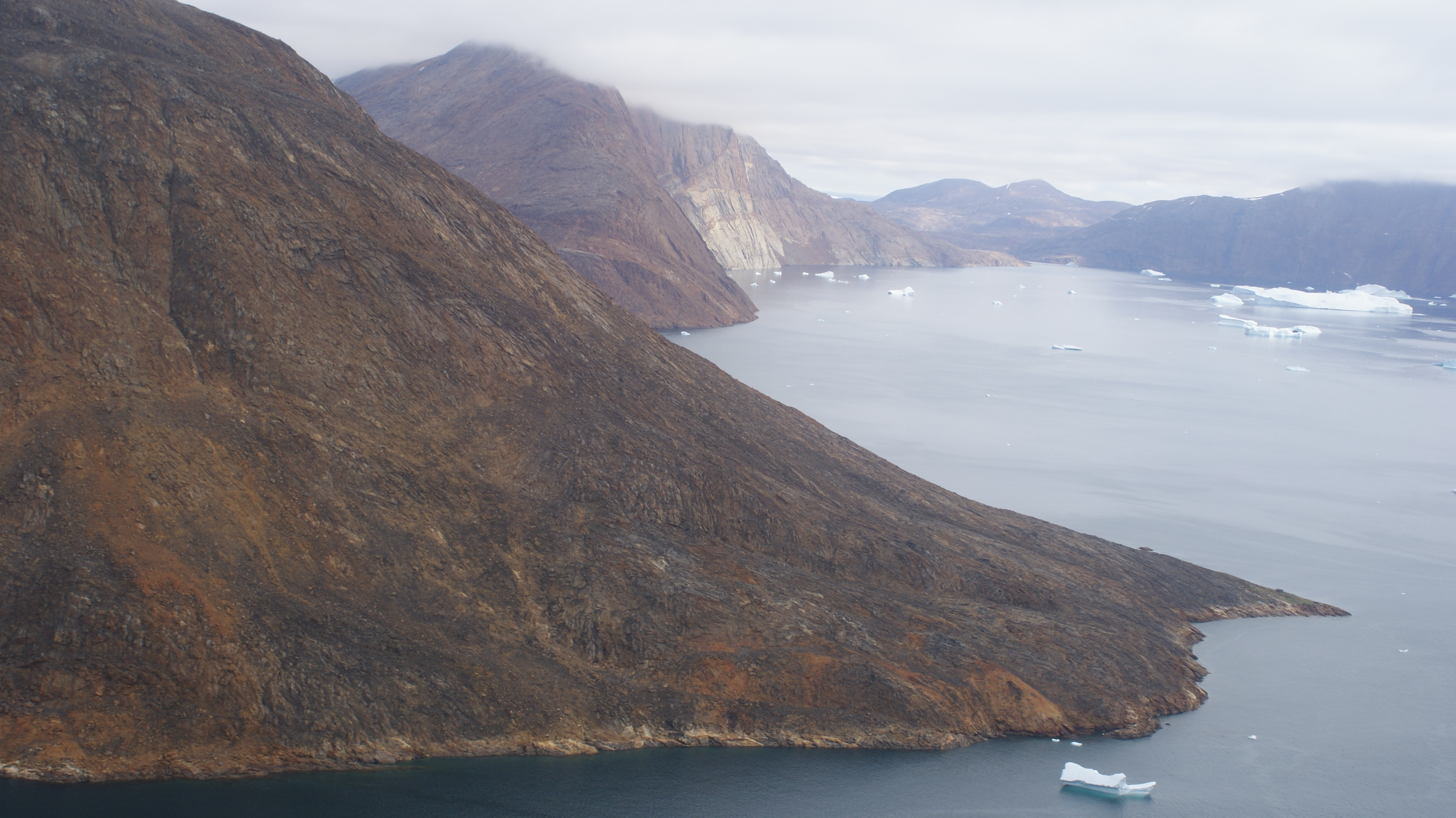
Left: western cape. Right: southwestern cape
