= Cape Shackleton =

Cape in Greenland

Coordinates: 73°48′13″N 56°49′57″W

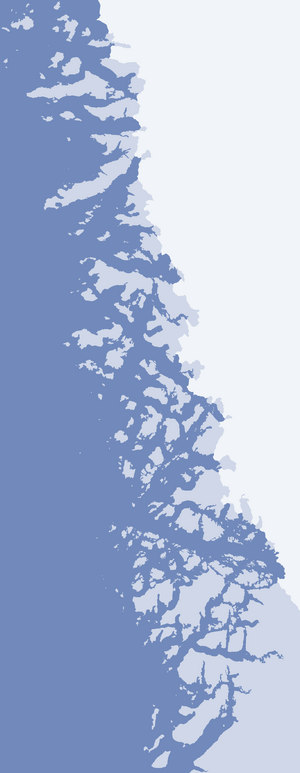
Cape Shackleton (Upernavik Archipelago)

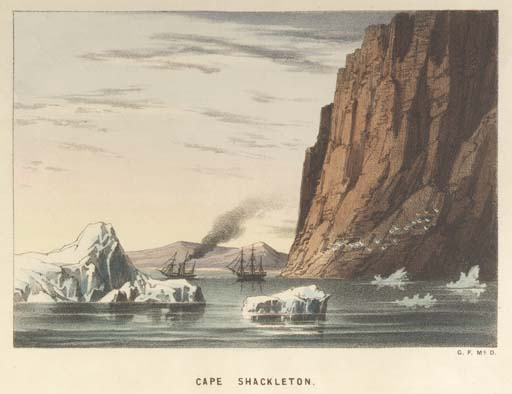
Cape Shackleton

Cape Shackleton is a cape in Avannaata municipality in northwestern Greenland. The cape is the western promontory on Apparsuit Island, delimiting the northern end of Tasiusaq Bay, an indentation of Baffin Bay in the Upernavik Archipelago.

This headland was known to whalers as "Horse's Head".
