= Apparsuit Island =

Island in Avannaata, Greenland

Apparsuit
- Location within Greenland

Geography
- Location: Greenland
- Coordinates: 73°48′N 56°45′W
- Archipelago: Upernavik Archipelago

Administration
- Greenland
- Municipality: Avannaata

Apparsuit Island (old spelling: Agparssuit) is an uninhabited island in Avannaata municipality in northwestern Greenland. Cape Shackleton, the western promontory of the island, marks the northernmost extent of Tasiusaq Bay, an indentation of Baffin Bay.

== History ==
The island is characteristic for its cliffs falling to the sea from all sides, providing shelter and a breeding ground for thousands of seabirds. Together with the cliffs of Qaarsorsuaq Island in the southern part of the archipelago, the number of birds reached millions. The cliffs were harvested for eggs starting from 1875, when the northbound migrations of Greenlanders from Upernavik reached the islands north of Tasiusaq. The eggs are occasionally harvested to this day.

== Geography ==
Apparsuit Island is located at the northern end of Tasiusaq Bay, in the north-central part of Upernavik Archipelago. It is an offlying island in the archipelago, separated from Qullikorsuit Island in the east by Appaalissiorfiup Ikerasaa strait, part of the old maritime route from Upernavik to Melville Bay. The highest point is an unnamed mountain of 658 m (2,159 ft) in the south of the island.
