= Niaqornarsuaq =

Mountain of Greenland

Coordinates: 69°55′N 50°25′W

Niaqornarsuaq is a mountain range in Greenland; it is located in the Upernavik Archipelago.
