= Appaalissiorfik =

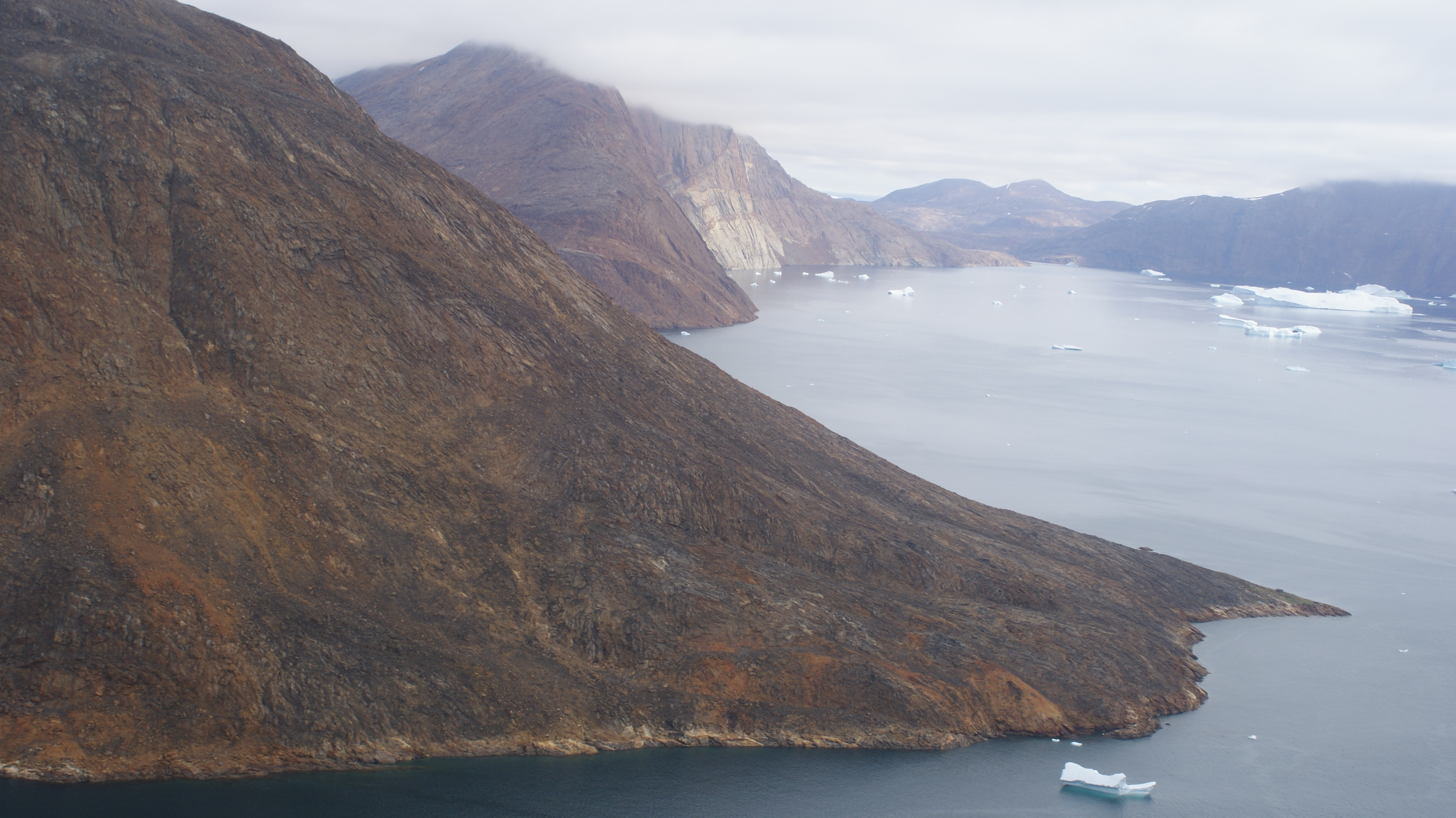
- Location of the former Appaalissiorfik settlement

- Location within Greenland
- Coordinates: 73°48′30″N 56°35′00″W
- Sovereign state: Kingdom of Denmark
- Autonomous country: Greenland
- Municipality: Avannaata
- Founded: 1916
- Abandoned: 1923
- Time zone: UTC-03

Appaalissiorfik (old spelling: Agpâligsiorfik) is a former settlement in Avannaata municipality in northwestern Greenland. It was located in the north-central part of Upernavik Archipelago, on the southwestern cape of Qullikorsuit Island, an island in Tasiusaq Bay. The settlement operated between 1916 and 1923.
