= Sugar Loaf Island =

Island in Avannaata, Greenland

Sugar Loaf
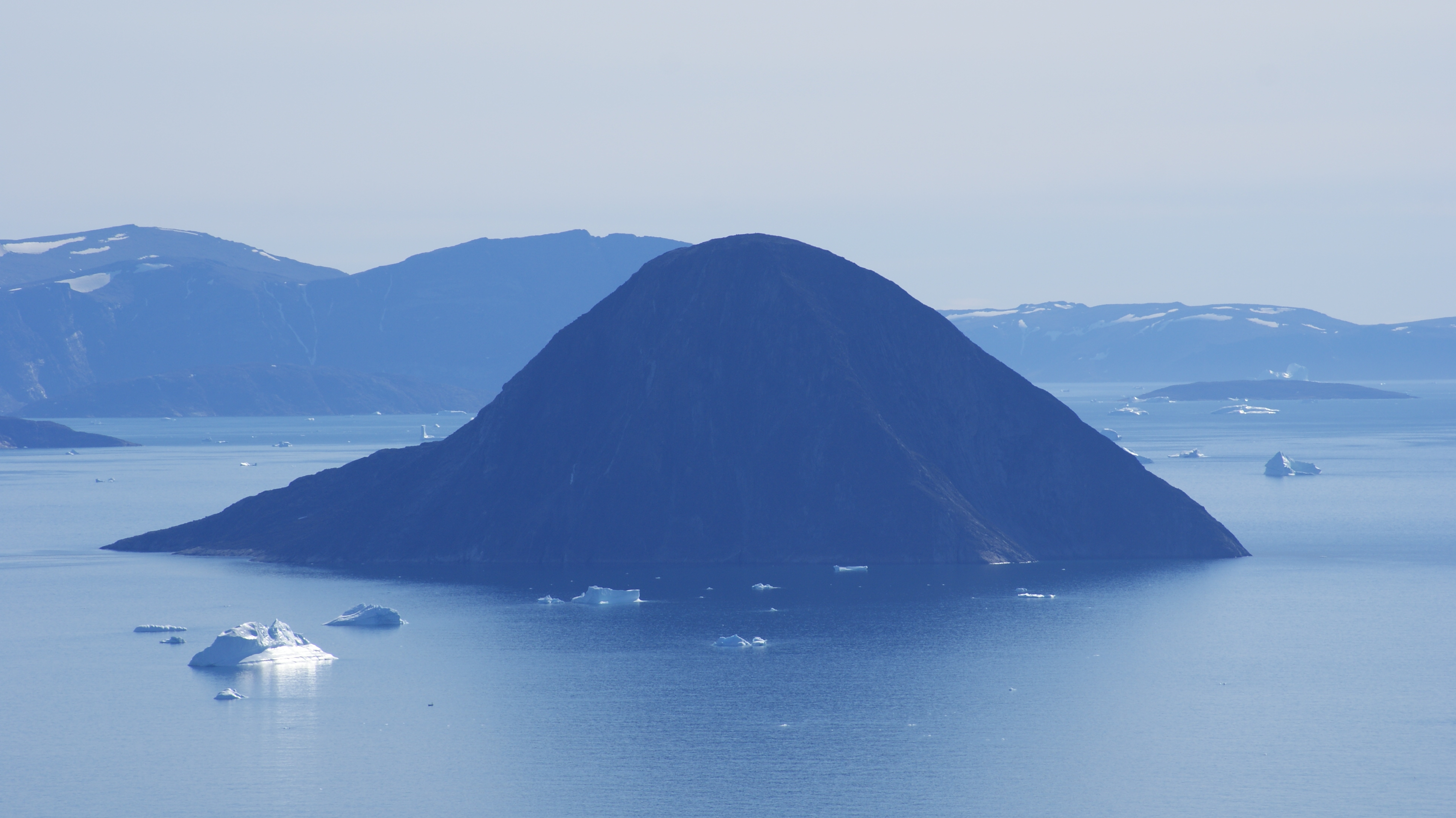
- Sugar Loaf Island

- Location within Greenland

Geography
- Location: Greenland
- Coordinates: 74°01′00″N 56°58′15″W
- Archipelago: Upernavik Archipelago

Administration
- Greenland
- Municipality: Avannaata

Sugar Loaf Island (Greenlandic: Uummannaq, old spelling: Ũmánaq) is a small, uninhabited island in Avannaata municipality in northwestern Greenland. The island is a single flooded mountain of 376 m (1,234 ft). Its name means "heart-shaped" in the Greenlandic language. The island is an important landmark in the region often afflicted by fog, and is used for coastal boat navigation.

== Geography ==
Sugar Loaf Island is located in the north-central part of Upernavik Archipelago, in the group between Kangerlussuaq Icefjord in the south, and Nuussuaq Peninsula in the north. The waters around the island are those of its namesake, the Sugar Loaf Bay, an indentation of Baffin Bay. The closest settlement is Nuussuaq, approximately 9.6 km (6.0 mi) to the north of the island.
