= Sugar Loaf Bay =

Bay in Avannaata, Greenland

Coordinates: 73°58′N 56°45′W

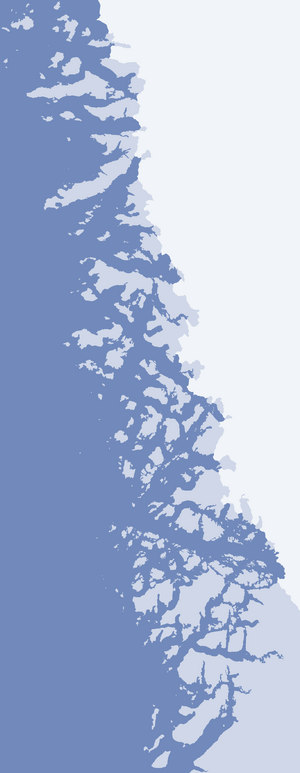
Sugar Loaf Bay (Upernavik Archipelago)

Sugar Loaf Bay is a bay in the Upernavik Archipelago in the Avannaata municipality in northwestern Greenland. It is an indentation of northeastern Baffin Bay. The name of the bay derives from the name of an island of the same name in the bay, Sugar Loaf Island (Greenlandic: Uummannaq, not to be confused with Uummannaq Island).

== Geography ==
The bay is located in the northern part of Upernavik Archipelago, between Qullikorsuit Island in the south and Nuussuaq Peninsula in the north.

At its widest − from the Nuussuup Nuua promontory on Nuussuaq Peninsula to the Nuussua cape on Kittorsaq Island − Sugar Loaf Bay stretches for 22.5 km (14.0 mi). The length of the bay reaches its maximum of 41.3 km (25.7 mi) at the point where the Greenland ice sheet (Greenlandic: Sermersuaq) drains into the bay via Cornell Glacier.

=== Islands ===
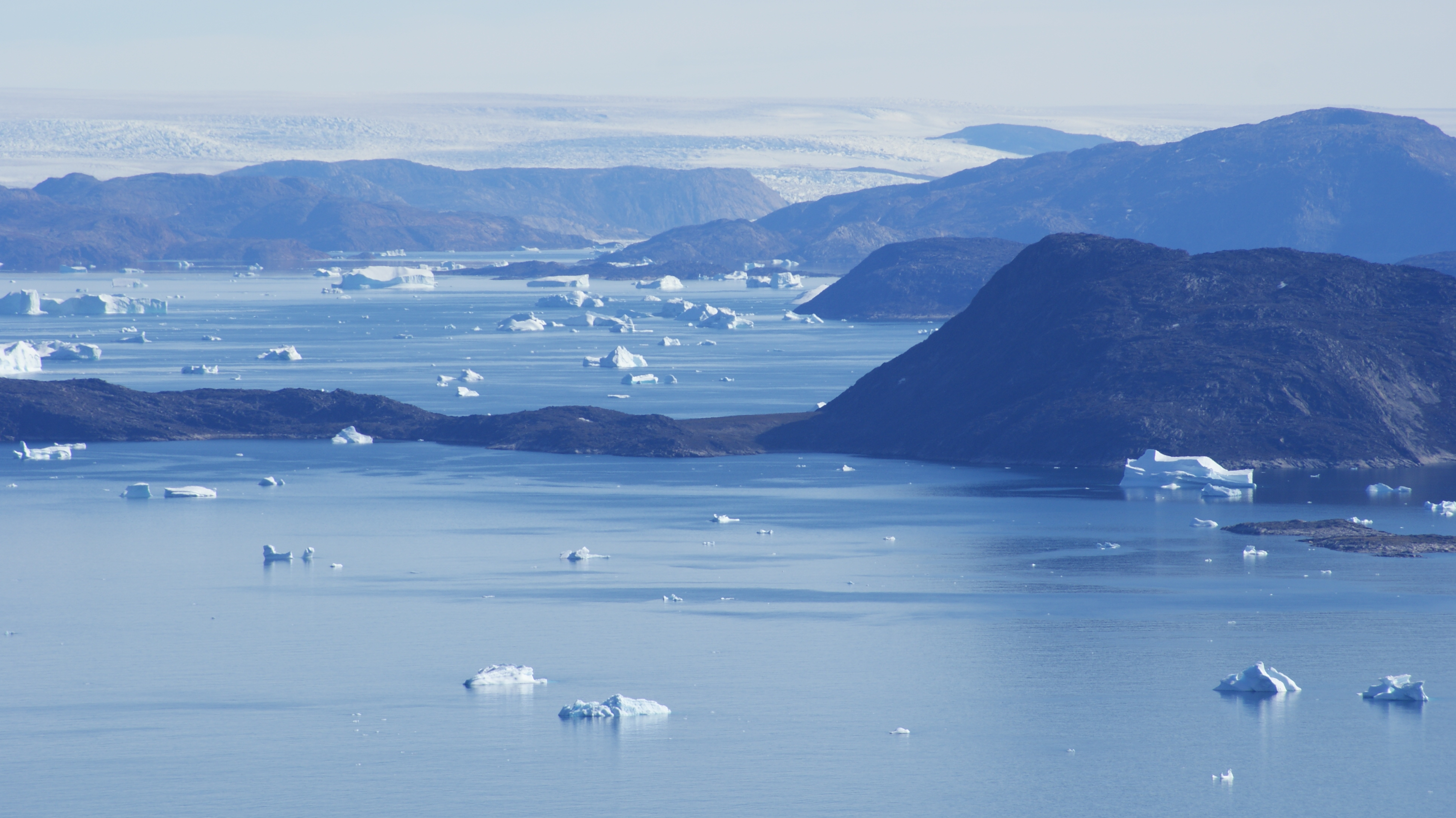
Inner (eastern) part of Sugar Loaf Bay

There are several islands and skerries in the bay, scattered over the entire area of the bay. Amitsorsuaq Island is the largest island in the bay, forming its southern boundary, and together with Nasaussaq Island separating the bay from the Nasaussap Saqqaa fjord.

Ikermiorsuaq Island occupies the center of the bay, while in the northern part of the bay there is a chain of islands paralleling the coastline of Nuussuaq Peninsula. These are, from northeast to southwest: the small Inussulikassak, Paornarqortut, Itissaalik (the largest of the chain), Saarlia, Timilersua (the second-largest), and Sugar Loaf Island.

In the south, Kittorsaq Island and the northwestern corner of Qullikorsuit Island define the southern end of the bay, at the mouth of Nuussuap Saqqaa Fjord.

=== Peninsulas ===
Nuussuaq Peninsula defines the northern limit of Sugar Loaf Bay. Several high, peninsular nunataqs of mainland Greenland extend into the bay: Anoritooq (1,108 m (3,635 ft)), Orsugissap Qaqqarsua (800 m (2,600 ft)), and Niaqornarsuaq (410 m (1,350 ft)).

=== Waterways ===
Nuussuup Kangia in the northeast and Nasaussap Saqqaa fjord in the southeast are prominent tributary fjords, the former forming an inward extension of the bay. In the east, Ieralassuit and Niaqornasuup Iterlaa are smaller indentations between the mainland nunataqs.

== Settlement ==
The islands of Sugar Loaf Bay are uninhabited. Nuussuaq is the only settlement in the bay, located east of the western tip of the Nuussuaq Peninsula. The bay is used as an inner waterway linking the settlements, offering partial shelter from the open waters of Baffin Bay for fishermen and hunters.

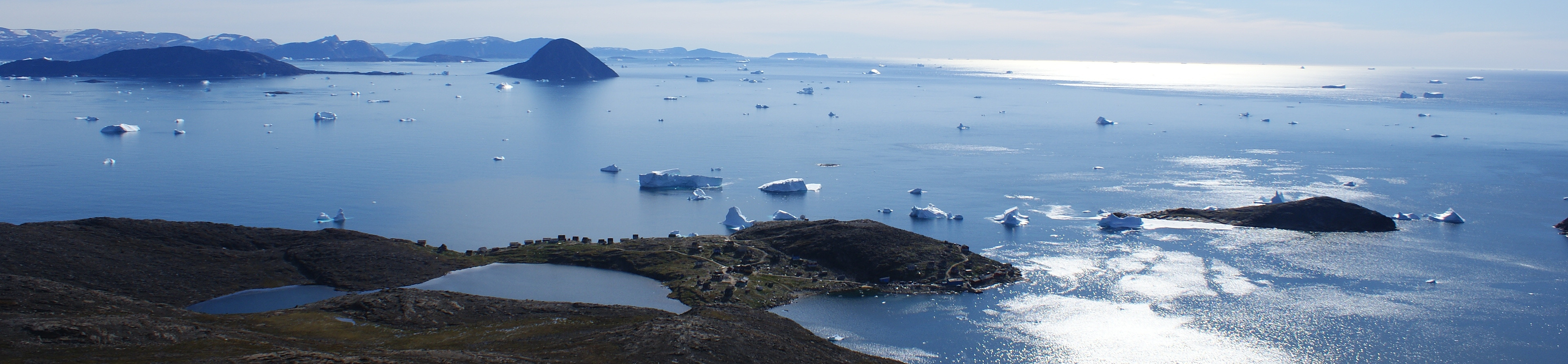
Sugar Loaf Bay seen from the ridge of Nuussuaq Peninsula: Nuussuaq settlement on the coast, Sugar Loaf Island in the far center, and open Baffin Bay in the west (right).
