= Nuussuaq =

Nuussuaq Kraulshavn
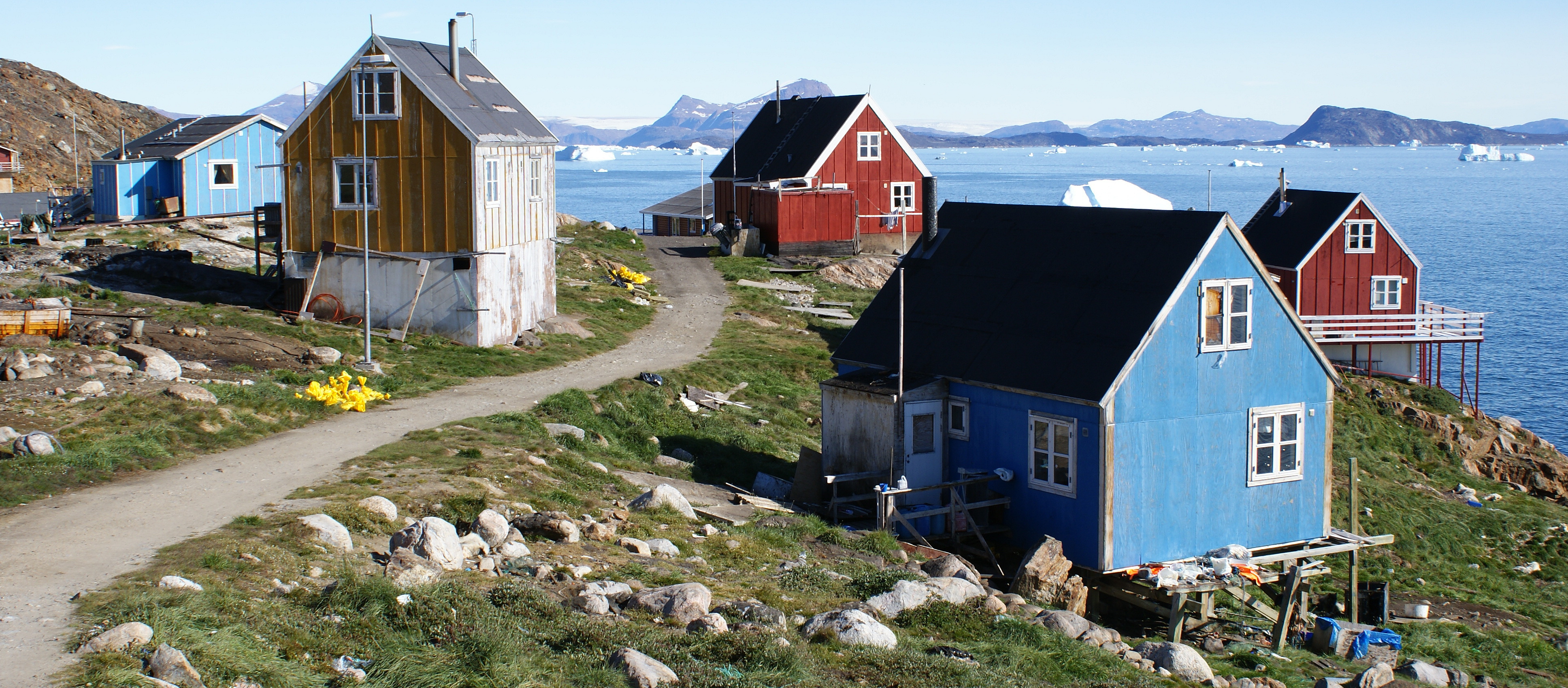
- Wooden houses in Nuussuaq

- Location within Greenland
- Coordinates: 74°06′40″N 57°03′40″W
- State: Kingdom of Denmark
- Constituent country: Greenland
- Municipality: Avannaata
- Founded: 1923

Population (2020)
  - Total: 181
- Time zone: UTC−02:00 (Western Greenland Time)
  - Summer (DST): UTC−01:00 (Western Greenland Summer Time)
- Postal code: 3962 Upernavik

Nuussuaq (old spelling: Nûgssuaq), formerly Kraulshavn, is a settlement in Avannaata municipality in northwestern Greenland. It is the only mainland settlement in the Upernavik Archipelago, located near the western tip of the Nuussuaq Peninsula, on the northern coast of Sugar Loaf Bay, an indentation of Baffin Bay.

The settlement was founded in 1923 as a trading station, growing in size during the post-war consolidation phase, when hunters from several small villages in the region of neighboring Inussulik Bay, Sugar Loaf Bay, and Tasiusaq Bay moved into the larger settlements such as Nuussuaq and Kullorsuaq further north in Melville Bay. Today Nuussuaq remains one of the most traditional hunting and fishing villages in Greenland, with a stable population. The settlement had 181 inhabitants in 2020.

== History ==
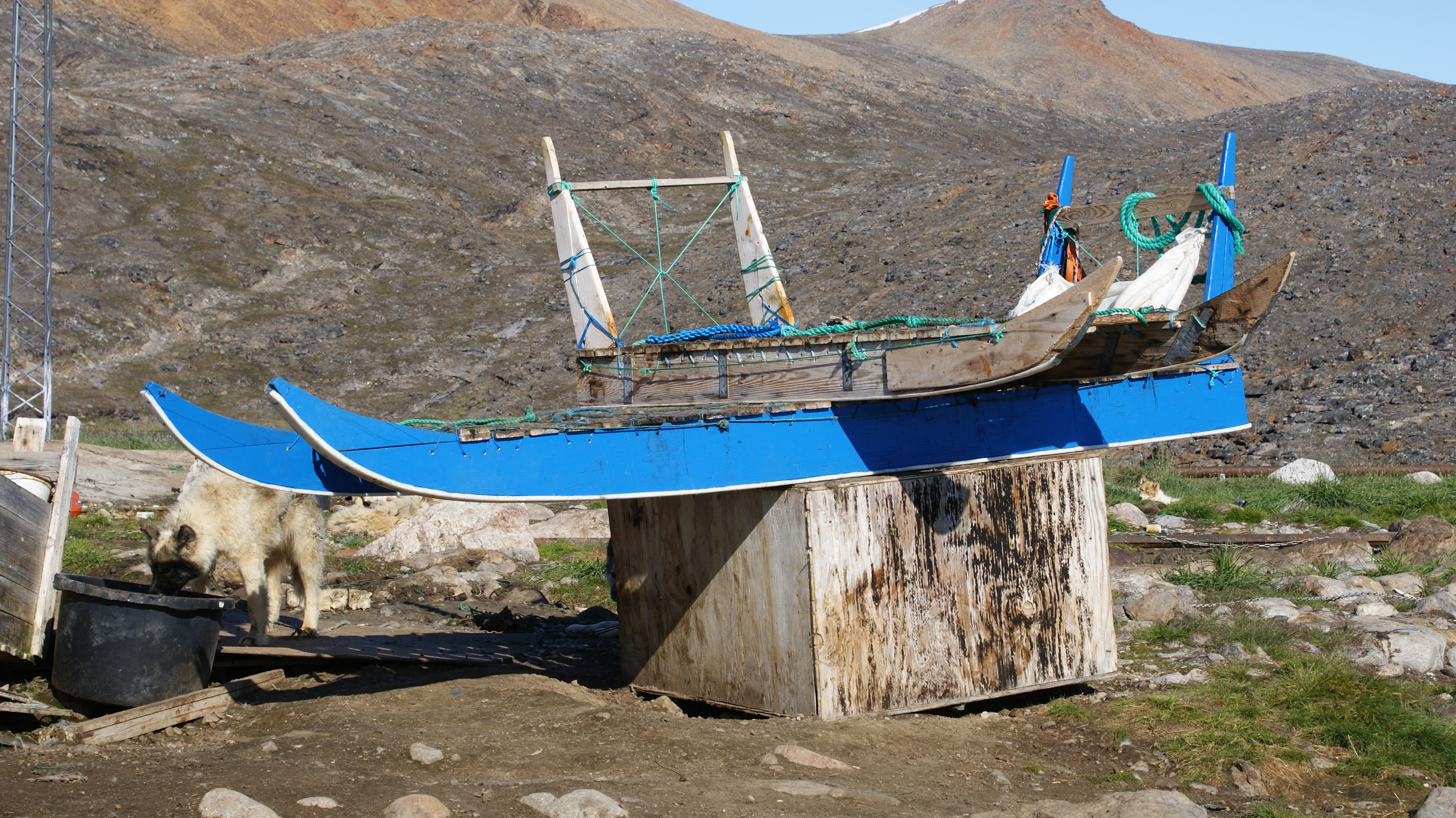
Dogsleds remain the means of transport in the winter

=== Prehistory ===
The Upernavik Archipelago belongs to the earliest-settled areas of Greenland; the first migrants arriving approximately 2,000 years BCE All southbound migrations of the Inuit passed through the area, leaving behind a trail of archeological sites. The early Saqqaq culture diminished in importance around 1.000 BCE, followed by the migrants of Dorset culture, who spread alongside the coast of Baffin Bay, being in turn misplaced by the Thule people in the 13th and 14th centuries. The archipelago has been continuously inhabited since then.

=== 20th century ===
Nuussuaq was founded in 1923 as a trading post, during the modern northbound migration of Greenlanders from Upernavik. The settlement was initially populated by hunters from the now abandoned villages of the region: Kuuk, Itissaalik (abandoned in 1957), and Ikermiut (abandoned in 1954). Not all of the initial wave of settlers from these villages of fewer than 10 people remained in Nuussuaq, but by the end of the 1920s, other families arrived in place of the hunters who moved north to Kullorsuaq in Melville Bay, and the community began to slowly grow.

Between 1930 and 1960, northwestern Greenland underwent a consolidation phase, driven by the Danish colonial authorities via Royal Greenland, then part of KNI, with a countrywide monopoly on trade. The mutual agreement between the hunting families and the trade company limited the pre-war northward expansion until the 1950s, when the populations of the smaller settlements reinforced larger communities in Nuussuaq and Kullorsuaq, where the physical limit of uninhabitable Melville Bay presented a natural barrier to expansion. Today Nuussuaq remains one of the most traditional hunting and fishing villages in Greenland.

== Geography ==
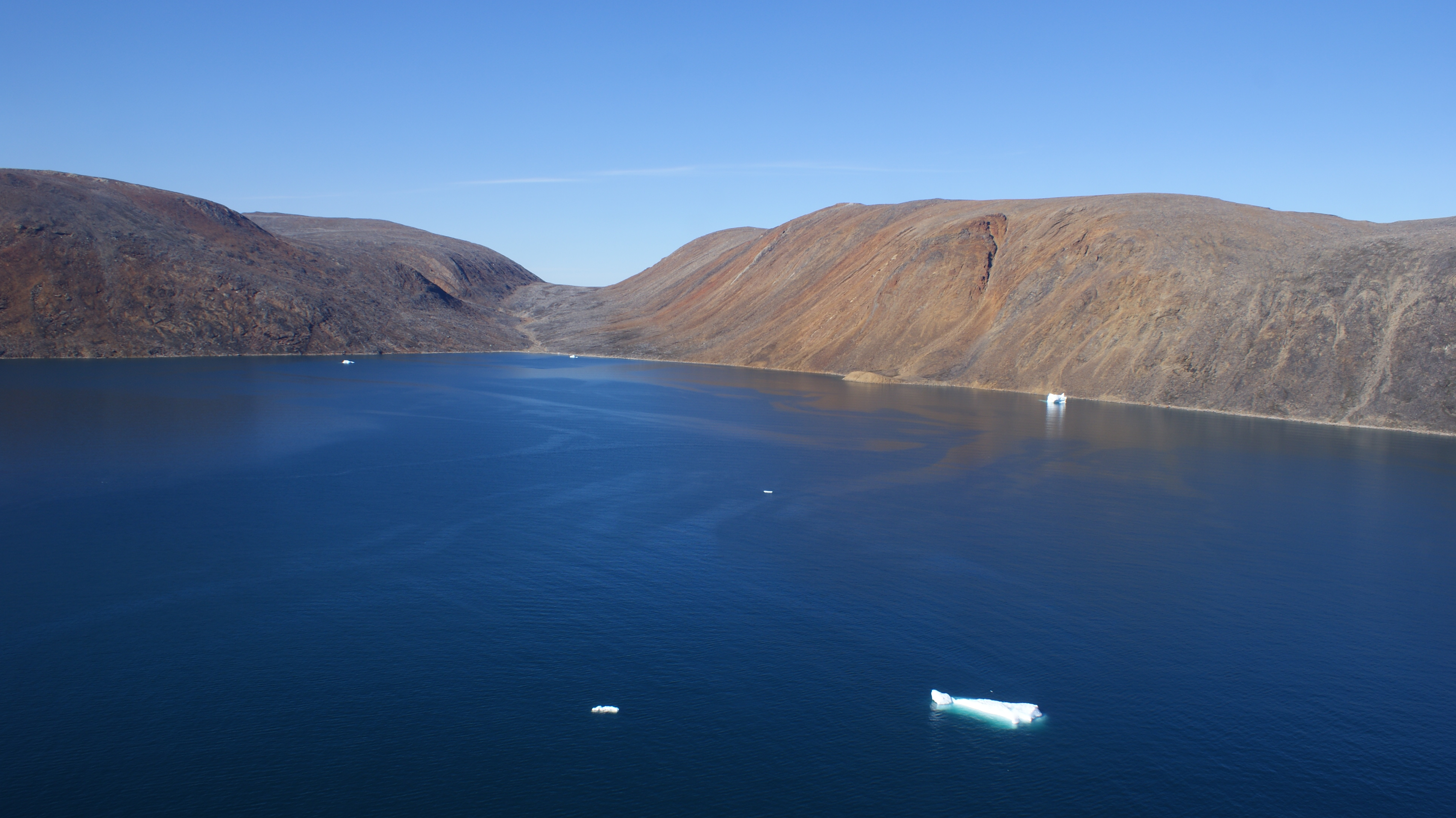
Protected inlet

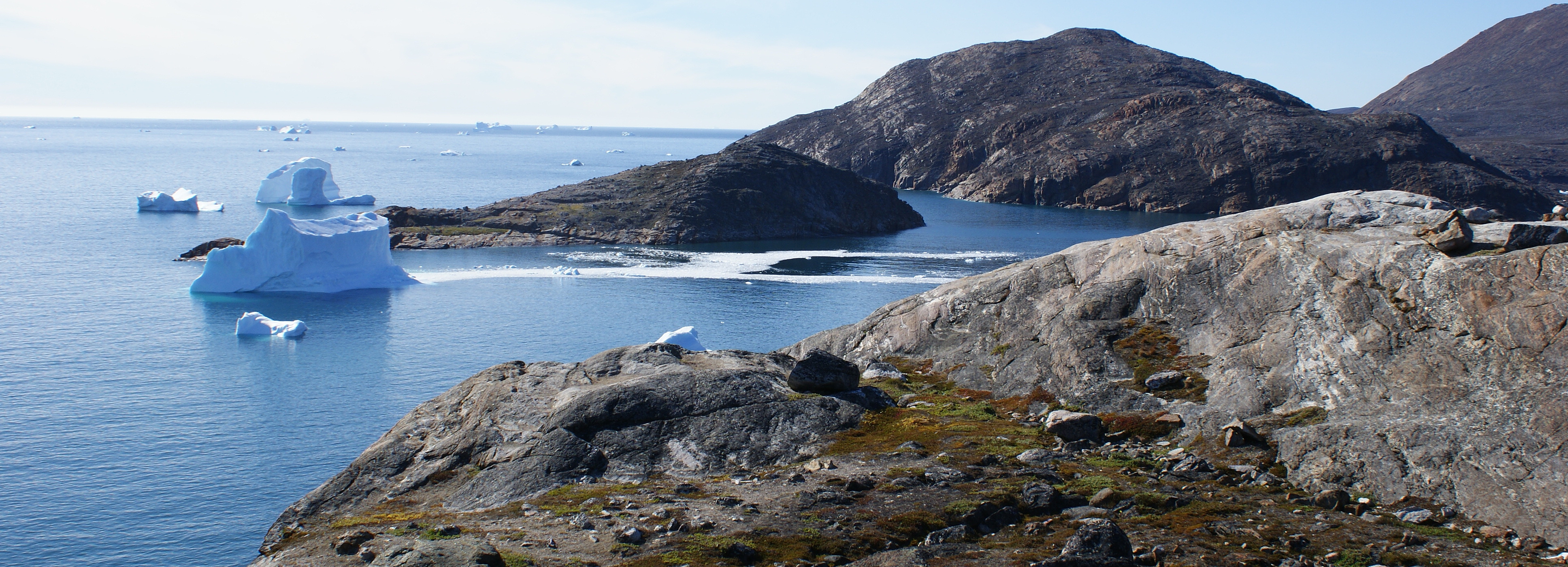
The gates to the inlet: Qallunaaq Arnaq (western spur) seen from Nuussuaq Heliport (eastern spur)

Nuussuaq's inlet of Sugar Loaf Bay

Nuussuaq is located in the northern part of Upernavik Archipelago, a vast archipelago of small islands on the coast of northeastern Baffin Bay. The settlement straddles a small rock spur jutting off Nuussuaq Peninsula, on the northern coast of Sugar Loaf Bay, an indentation of Baffin Bay. The name of both the settlement and the peninsula means "a large tip" in the Greenlandic language.

Nuussuaq is the only mainland settlement between Ukkusissat in the Uummannaq Fjord region and Pituffik, near Pituffik Space Base. All other settlements of the archipelago are insular.

The rock spur off Nuussuaq Peninsula encloses a small inlet of Sugar Loaf Bay from the south, met by another spur in the west, nearly closing off the inlet, with a small island between the two spurs. The inlet provides good harbourage and protection from the open waters of Baffin Bay, a deciding factor for the foundation of the settlement. The western spur is called "Qallunaaq Arnaq" (old spelling: Qavdlunâq Arnaq) − literally: "Danish Woman" in the Greenlandic language − named so for its shape resembling brassiere, at one time a novelty. The name is not unique to the region: an identically named hill of similar shape is located in western Greenland, east of Sisimiut, on the shores of Ikertooq Fjord.

The protection offered by the inlet is complemented by several factors facilitating settlement: two freshwater lakes are located immediately to the east of the village, while the southern coast of Nuussuaq Peninsula is protected from northward winds in the winter. The short distance (6.8 km (4.2 mi)) from Nuussuup Nuua − the western cape of the 52 km (32 mi) long Nuussuaq Peninsula − placed the settlement on the old maritime route from Upernavik, through the islands of Tasiusaq Bay, to Kullorsuaq in Melville Bay.

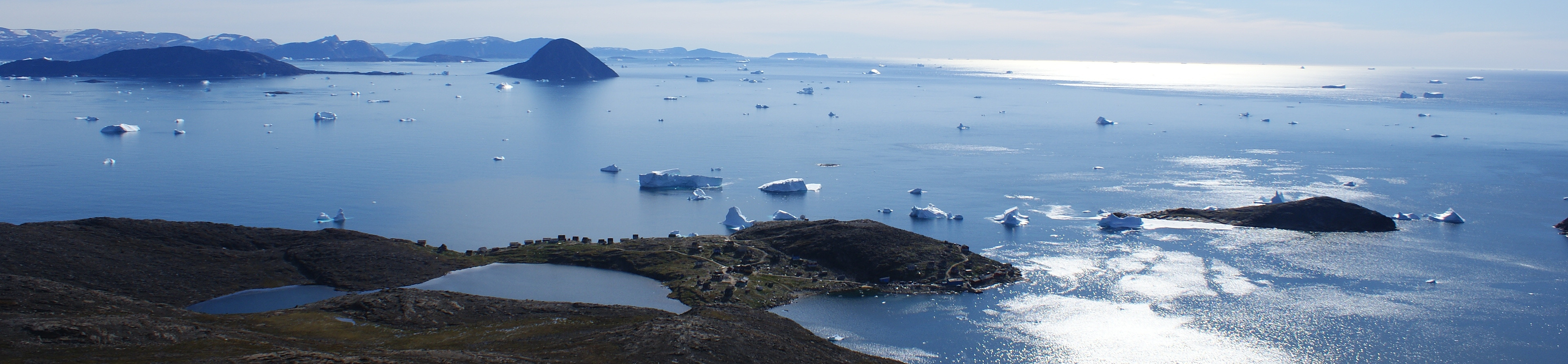
Sugar Loaf Bay seen from the ridge of Nuussuaq Peninsula: freshwater lakes, Nuussuaq settlement on the coast, Sugar Loaf Island in the far center, and open Baffin Bay in the west (right).

== Economy ==
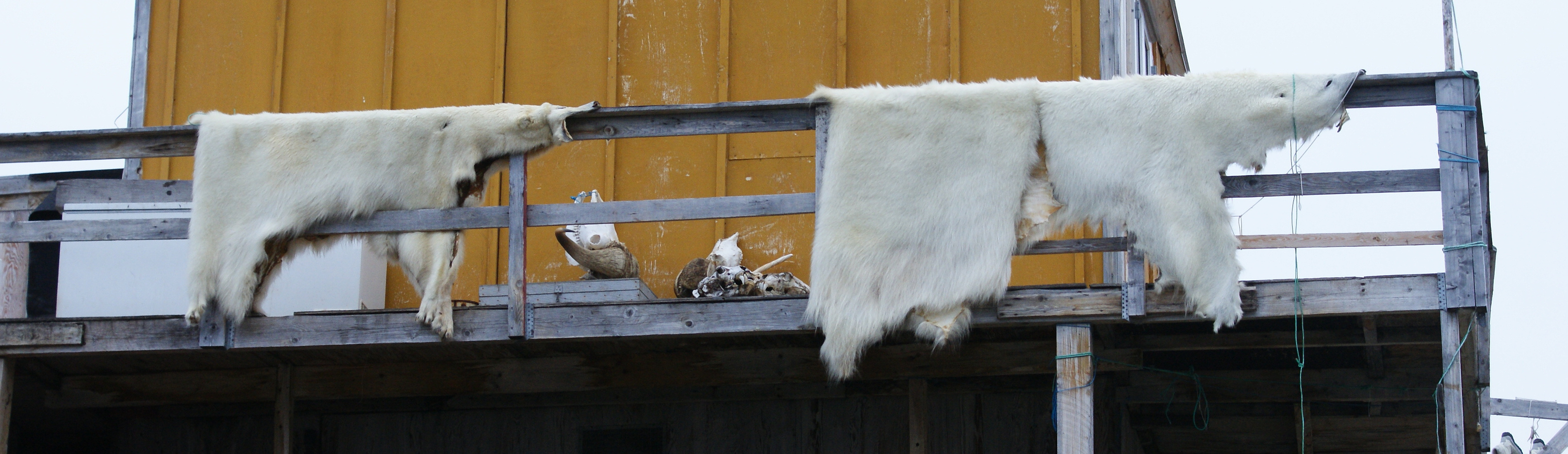
Tradition: a hunter's house with drying polar bear skins

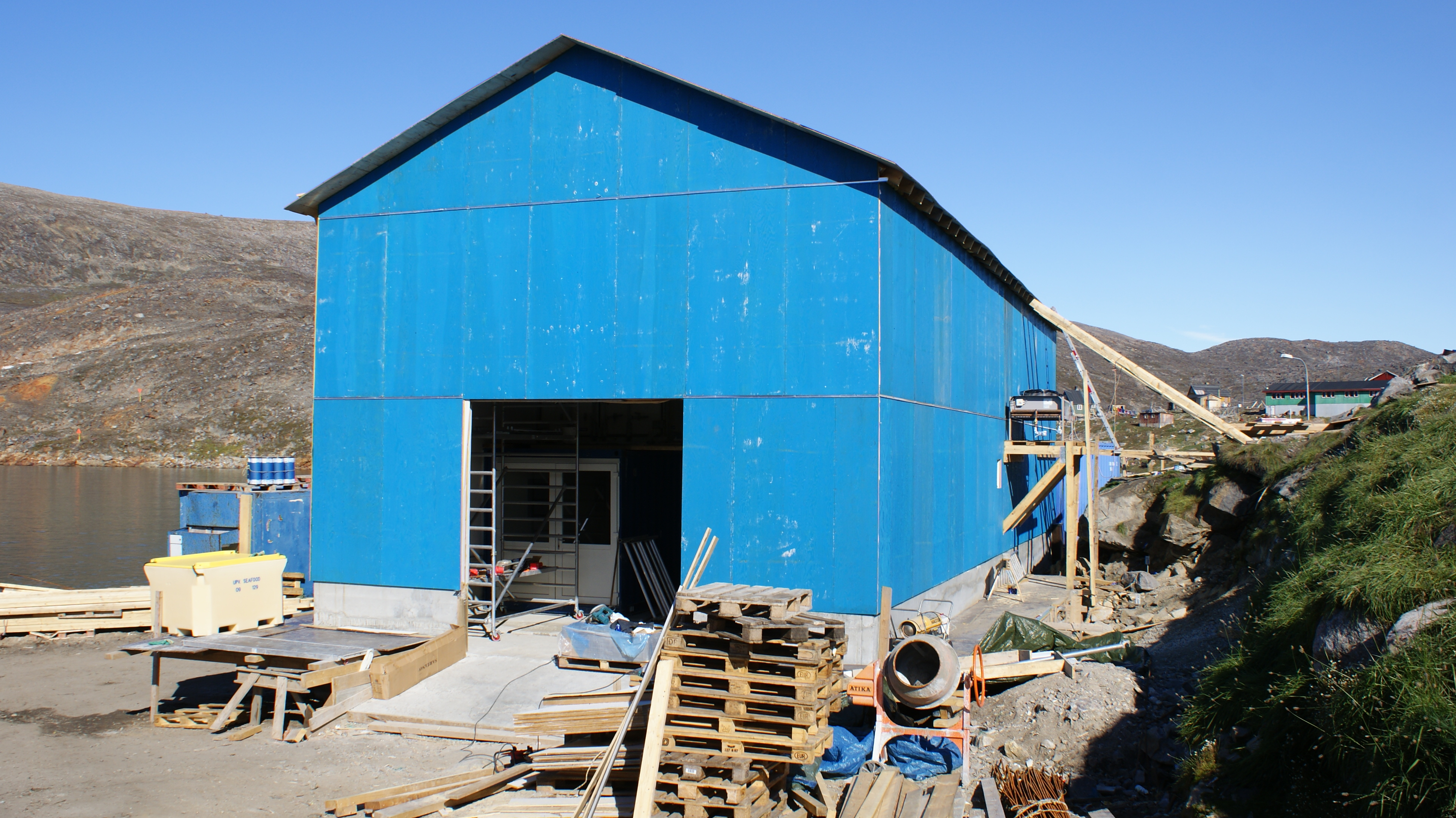
Organized labor: a fish processing factory

Traditional versus modern occupation

Hunting and fishing are the mainstay of the area, although the more northern settlements still rely on traditional hunting of fur seals, walruses, and whales to supplement the family economy. In that, the northern region is culturally linked with the far north of Greenland (Greenlandic: Avannarsuaq), the Qaanaaq region.

Outside of Upernavik town, the average level of income in the archipelago is amongst the lowest in Greenland. Alongside three other settlements in the archipelago (Naajaat, Kullorsuaq, and Upernavik Kujalleq), Nuussuaq is listed in the top 10 poorest within Greenland.

On 28 August 2010, a fish processing factory of Upernavik Seafood was opened in Nuussuaq, joining the set of 8 other such factories in the Upernavik Archipelago. Apart from the communal all-purpose Pilersuisoq store, the factory is the first business enterprise in the settlement.

== Transport ==
Air Greenland serves the village as part of government contract, with twice-weekly helicopter flights to Kullorsuaq and Upernavik.

== Population ==
In 2010, Nuussuaq had 204 inhabitants. The population of the settlement has slowly increased over the last two decades, reflecting the trend in neighboring Kullorsuaq.

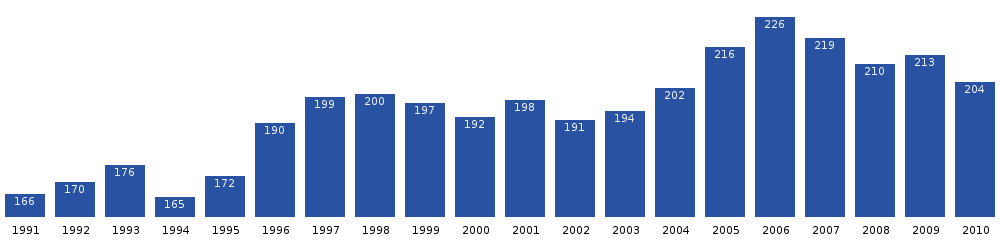
Nuussuaq population growth dynamics in the last two decades. Source: Statistics Greenland
