= Nuussuaq Peninsula (Upernavik Archipelago) =

Peninsula in Greenland

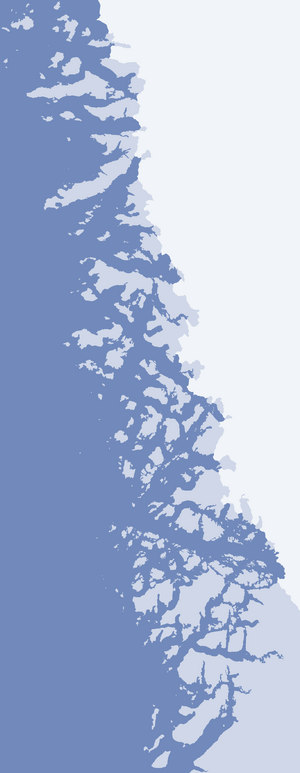
Nuussuaq Peninsula (Upernavik Archipelago)

Nuussuaq Peninsula (old spelling Nûgssuaq or simply Nugsuak) is a mainland peninsula in northwestern Greenland, located at the northern end of Upernavik Archipelago, approximately 70 km (43 mi) to the south of Melville Bay. It is much smaller than its namesake in western Greenland.

== Geography ==
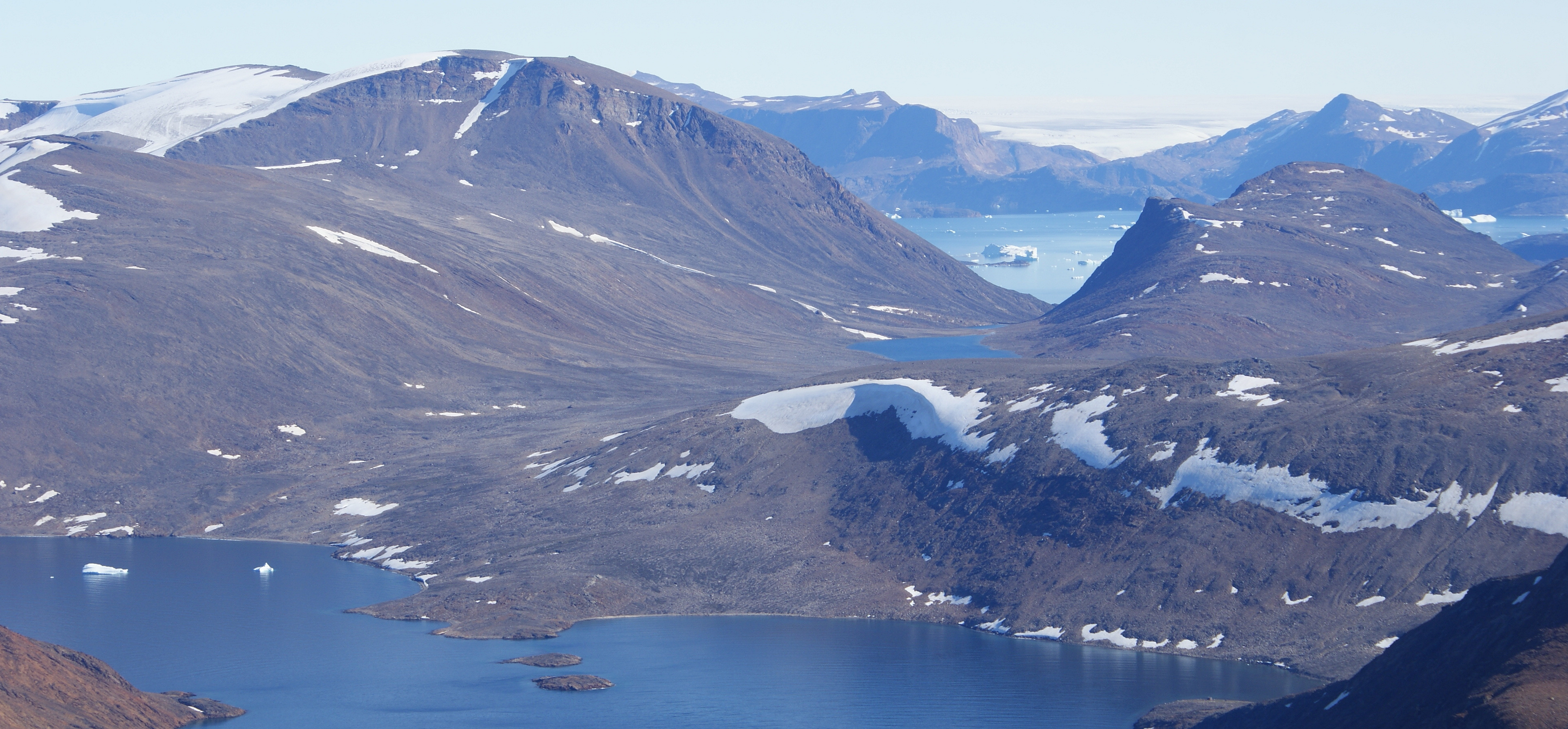
Aerial view of Nuussuaq Peninsula from the west.

The base of the peninsula is a nunatak located at 74°22′30″N 56°00′00″W, and rising to 280 m (920 ft) above the Greenland ice sheet (Greenlandic: Sermersuaq) reaching the sea level to the south and north of the nunatak. The peninsula has a southwest–northwest orientation, jutting into Baffin Bay to the southwest, separating the Nuussuup Kangia fjord in the southeast from the Inussulik Bay in the northwest.

The peninsula is narrow, approximately 52 km (32 mi) long, and 5 km (3.1 mi) wide, narrowing to a 2 km (1.2 mi) isthmus in several places. It is very mountainous, culminating in two 860 km (530 mi) peaks in its central part. The mountain tops at the spine of the peninsula are partially glaciated, with the Sermikassaq mountain glacier flowing to the north from the highest point.

While the small bay near the Nuussuaq settlement provides a sheltered harbour, the remainder of the southeastern coastline is not developed. There are several fjords on the northwestern shore, from Qasigialissuaq in the southwest, to Qasigiassuit and much larger Kangerluarsuk in the northeast. The latter separates the peninsula from Illulissuaq Peninsula, a smaller peninsula branching off Nuussuaq Peninsula west of its base. The only island of any size in Inussulik Bay off the northern coast is the flooded mountain of Illoorfik Island.

== Settlement ==
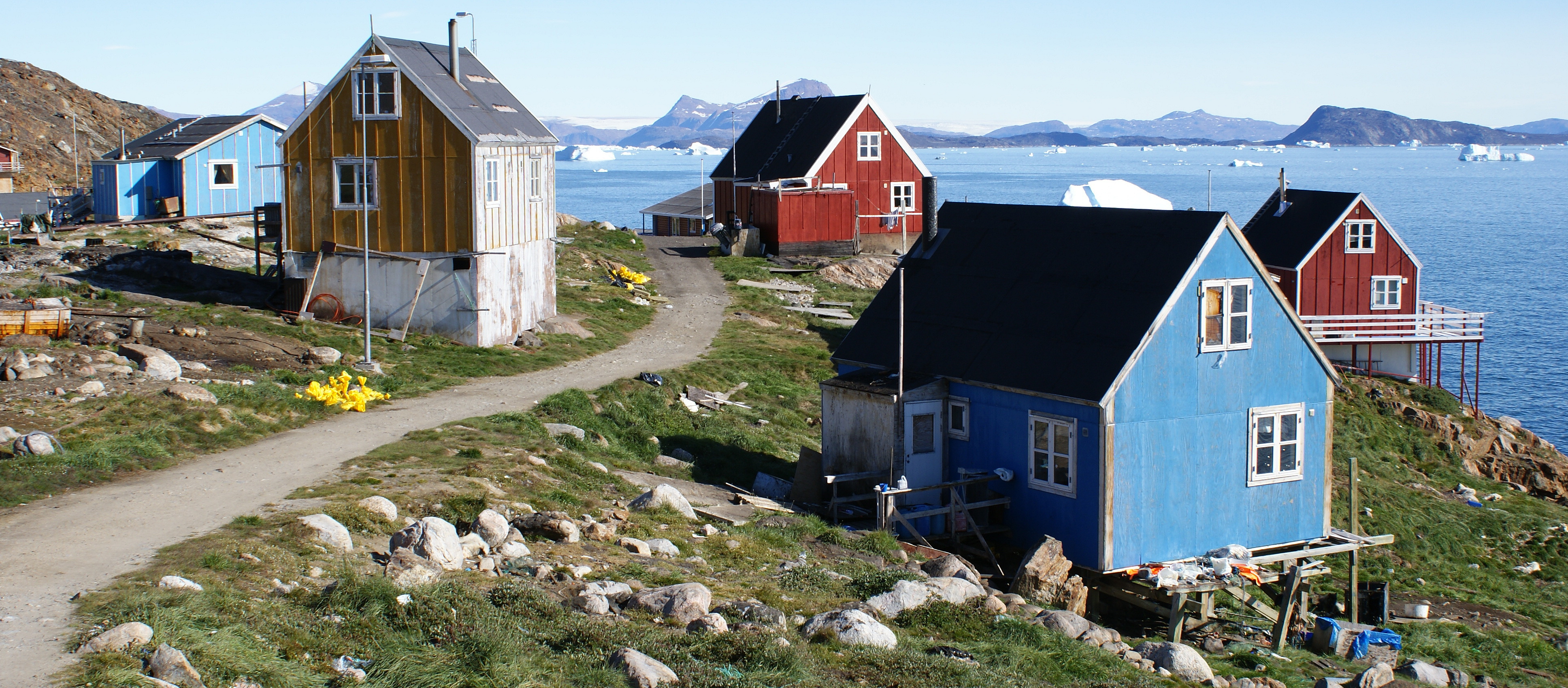
The hunting and fishing Nuussuaq village is the only settlement on the peninsula

Although there are many island settlements in the region, Nuussuaq Peninsula is the only permanently inhabited part of the approximately 700 kilometres (430 mi) long stretch of the mainland of Greenland between Ukkusissat, a village located on Ukkusissat Peninsula in the Uummannaq Fjord region 382 km (237 mi) to the south, and Savissivik at the northern end of Melville Bay, 313 km (194 mi) to the north. The Nuussuaq settlement is located east of the Nuussuup Nuua, the southwestern cape at 74°05′35″N 57°16′40″W.

== Tourism ==
There are several trails across the peninsula, but the mountainous interior is limited to mountaineering. Tourism in the region is very undeveloped, and there are no facilities. The coastline of the peninsula can be explored by chartering the boats of the local seal hunters.
