= Paugussett (disambiguation) =

Paugusset are a Native American tribe in Connecticut and their historical town.

Paugussett or Paugusset may also refer to:

== People ==
- Golden Hill Paugussett Indian Nation, a state-recognized tribe in Connecticut

== Places ==
- Paugussett State Forest, a protected forest in Newtown, Connecticut
- Paugussett Trail, a hiking trail in Fairfield County, Connecticut

== Other ==
- Paugassett Lodge, a group within the Housatonic Council, a local council of Scouting America

== See also ==
- Paagussat Island, Greenland
