= Nutaarmiut (disambiguation) =

Nutaarmiut may refer to the following areas in Greenland:

== Islands ==
- Nutaarmiut Island, the largest island of Upernavik Archipelago in northwestern Greenland
- Nutaarmiut Island (Tasiusaq Bay), an island of Upernavik Archipelago in northwestern Greenland

== Settlement ==
- Nutaarmiut, a settlement on Nutaarmiut Island in Tasiusaq Bay, Upernavik Archipelago, in northwestern Greenland
