= Saattorsuaq Island =

Island in Avannaata, Greenland

Saattorsuaq
- Location within Greenland

Geography
- Location: Greenland
- Coordinates: 73°30′50″N 56°07′00″W
- Archipelago: Upernavik Archipelago

Administration
- Greenland
- Municipality: Avannaata

Saattorsuaq Island (old spelling: Sâtorssuaq) is a small, uninhabited island in Avannaata municipality in northwestern Greenland.

== History ==
The island was inhabited between 1881 and 1957, when a small Saattoq village of several families was scattered between the island, and the Saattoq skerry just off the northern coast.

== Geography ==
Saattorsuaq Island is located in Tasiusaq Bay, in the north-central part of Upernavik Archipelago. The island is separated from Nuuluk Island in the northeast, Aappilattoq Island in the southwest, Nutaarmiut Island in the west, and Qallunaat Island in the northwest by the inner waterways of Tasiusaq Bay.
