= Lillinonah =

Lillinonah may refer to:

- Lake Lillinonah, the second largest lake in Connecticut
- Lillinonah Trail, a public park in Newtown, Connecticut
