= Sarfaq =

- Location within Greenland
- Coordinates: 73°38′50″N 56°12′10″W
- Sovereign state: Kingdom of Denmark
- Autonomous country: Greenland
- Municipality: Avannaata
- Founded: 1898
- Abandoned: 1919
- Time zone: UTC-03

Sarfaq is a former settlement in the Upernavik Archipelago region of northwestern Greenland. It was located on Qallunaat Island, an island in Tasiusaq Bay, in the north-central part of the archipelago. The village was perched near the eastern cape of the island, on the shores of Kangerlussuaq Icefjord. The settlement was abandoned in 1919.
