= Saattoq =

- Location within Greenland
- Coordinates: 73°31′19″N 56°07′50″W
- Sovereign state: Kingdom of Denmark
- Autonomous country: Greenland
- Municipality: Avannaata
- Founded: 1881
- Abandoned: 1957
- Time zone: UTC-03

Saattoq (old spelling: Sâtoq) is a former settlement in Avannaata municipality in northwestern Greenland. It was located in the north-central part of Upernavik Archipelago, in Tasiusaq Bay, straddling Saattorsuaq Island, and the nearby Saattoq skerry.

== History ==
Saattoq was populated in 1881. It was a very small village of fewer than 10 people at any time. It was abandoned in 1957, during the post-war consolidation phase in northwestern Greenland, with the surviving population moving to nearby Nutaarmiut.
