= Nunatakassaup Sermia (Tasiusaq Bay) =

Glacier in Tasiusaq Bay, Greenland

- Interactive map of Nunatakassaup Sermia
- Location: Upernavik Archipelago, Greenland
- Coordinates: 73°15′N 55°05′W
- Terminus: Tasiusaq Bay

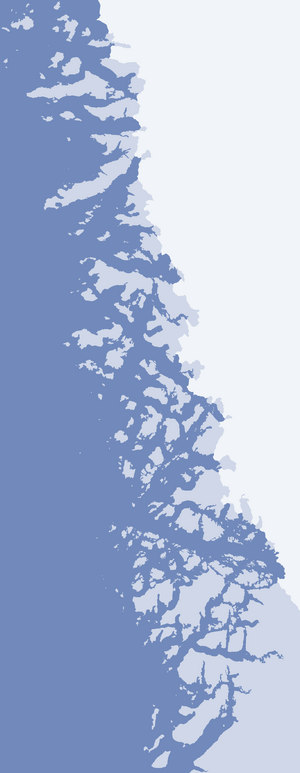
Nunatakassaup Sermia (Tasiusaq Bay, Upernavik Archipelago)

Nunatakassaup Sermia (old spelling: Nunatakavsaup Sermia) is a tidewater glacier in Avannaata municipality on the northwestern shore of Greenland. It drains the Greenland ice sheet southwestwards into Tasiusaq Bay. The glacier front is located to the southeast of the Nunatarsuaq nunatak, and to the north of the Qassersuaq Peninsula. Alanngorsuup Sermia, a sibling glacier to the south, drains the icesheet into the same point at the inner end of Tasiusaq Bay.
