= Qassersuaq Peninsula =

Peninsula in Avannaata, Greenland

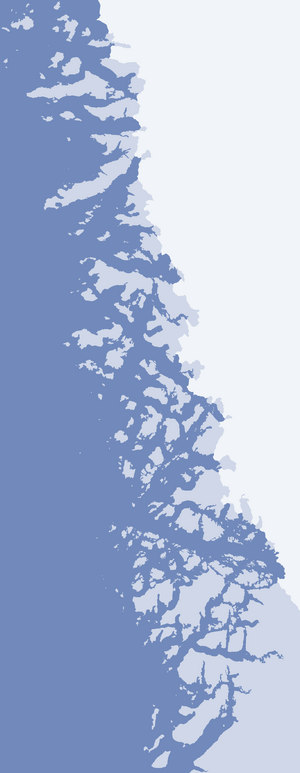
Qassersuaq Peninsula (Upernavik Archipelago)

Qassersuaq Peninsula (old spelling: Qagsserssuaq) is a mainland peninsula in northwestern Greenland, located in the south-central part of Upernavik Archipelago.

== Geography ==
The peninsula is of triangular shape, with the base adjacent to the Greenland ice sheet (Greenlandic: Sermersuaq), south of the Alanngorsuup Sermia glacier. The distance from the Qaassorsuaq promontory in the west at 73°05′10″N 55°42′55″W, to the innermost unglaciated part of the mainland is 24.3 km (15.1 mi). In the northwest, the inner waterways of southern Tasiusaq Bay weakly indent the peninsula with the Nuniaat Bay. In the south, the Qassersuit Saqqaa strait separates the peninsula from a chain of larger islands of the archipelago, bounding Upernavik Icefjord from the northeast: Maniitsoq Island, Puugutaa Island, Sisuarissut Island, and Qaneq Island.

The peninsula is very mountainous, culminating in several glaciated summits. The highest, unnamed peak in the center of the peninsula reaches 1,160 m (3,810 ft). Other named summits include Qassersuit at 1,080 m (3,540 ft) in the center, Issumaarsuaq at 870 m (2,850 ft) in the north, and Nuniaat Qaqqarsua at 1,023 m (3,356 ft) in the west.
