= Lillinonah Trail =

Hiking trail in Connecticut, United States

Coordinates: 41.46°N 73.31°W

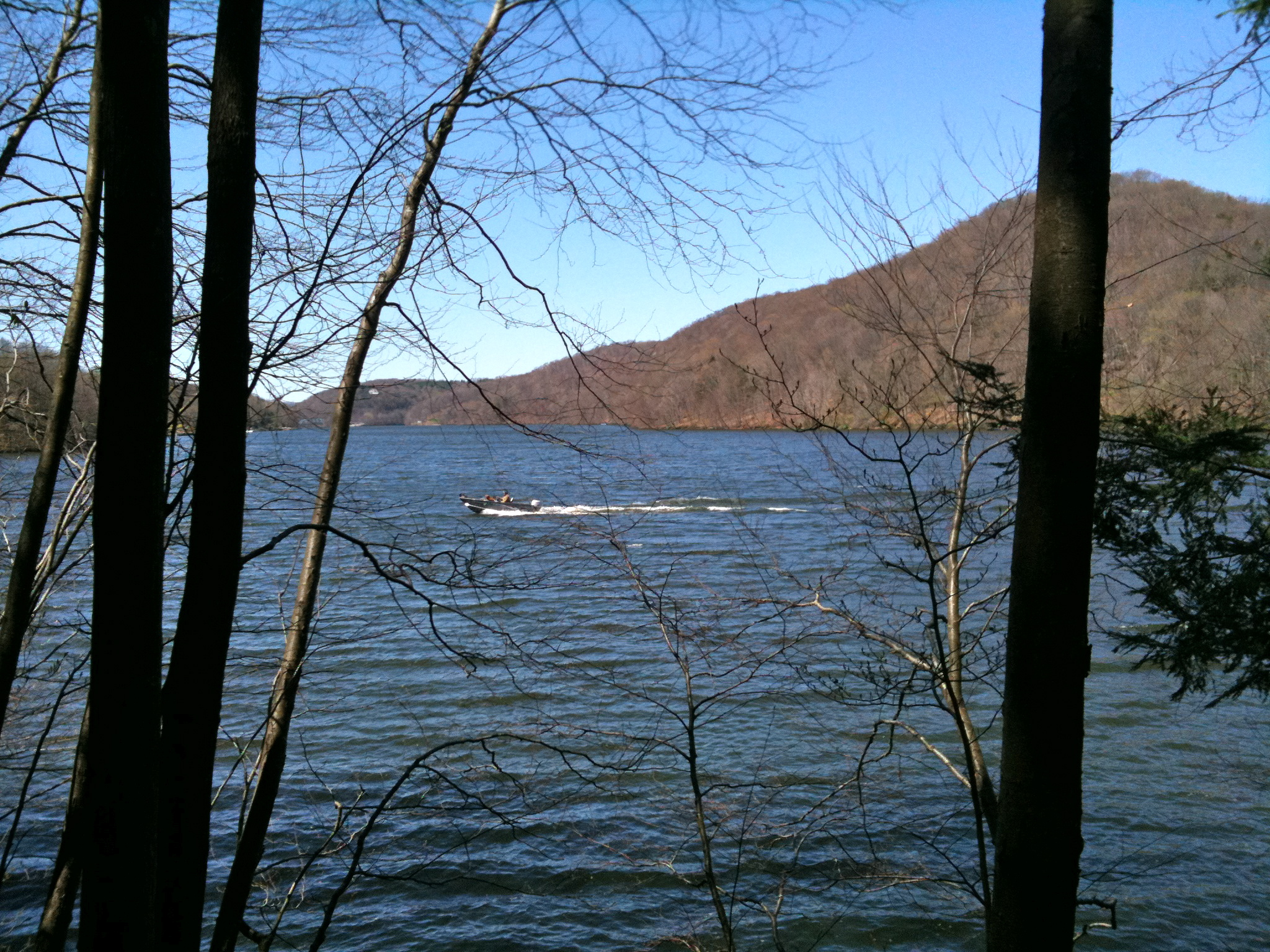
- Lake Lillinonah from the Lillinonah Trail, Newtown, Connecticut.
- Length: 5.9 miles (9.5 km)
- Location: Newtown, Connecticut
- Designation: CFPA Blue-Blazed Trail
- Trailheads: Hanover Road (near State boat launch on Pond Brook); Echo Valley Road parking lot for Paugussett State Forest Upper Block
- Use: hiking, cross-country skiing, snowshoeing, fishing, other
- Highest point: Upper Paugussett State Forest, 480 ft (150 m)
- Lowest point: Lake Lillinonah at Shepaug Dam, 194 ft (59 m)
- Difficulty: easy, with very few difficult sections
- Season: April 16 to December 14
- Sights: Pond Brook inlet, Lake Lillinonah, Great Oak, Shepaug Dam, Maple Sugaring, Eagles
- Hazards: hunters, deer ticks, poison ivy, eagles

The Lillinonah Trail is a 5.9-mile (9.5 km) Blue-Blazed hiking trail "system" in the lower Housatonic River valley in Fairfield County and, today, is entirely in Newtown. Most of the trail is in the upper block of Paugussett State Forest.

The mainline (official "Blue-Blazed") trail circles the Paugussett State Forest "upper block". The west, north and east portions of the trail are shared with the northern section of Al's Trail—a ten-mile trail in Newtown.

The Lillinonah Trail today is composed of four sides in a square "loop".

Notable features include the Hanover Road parking lot and boat launch, semi-obscured (by trees) scenic views of Pond Brook inlet and Lake Lillinonah (Housatonic River), a climb to a high point of 480-foot (150 m), a very large oak tree, several stone fences and foundations and a demonstration of a maple sugaring technique known as "sugarbush" near the Echo Valley Road parking lot. The Lillinonah Trail is maintained largely through the efforts of the Connecticut Forest and Park Association and the Newtown Forest Association.

The Lillinonah Trail appears to have been a larger trail in the 1940s based on the map in the 1940 CFPA Connecticut Walk Book.

== Trail description ==
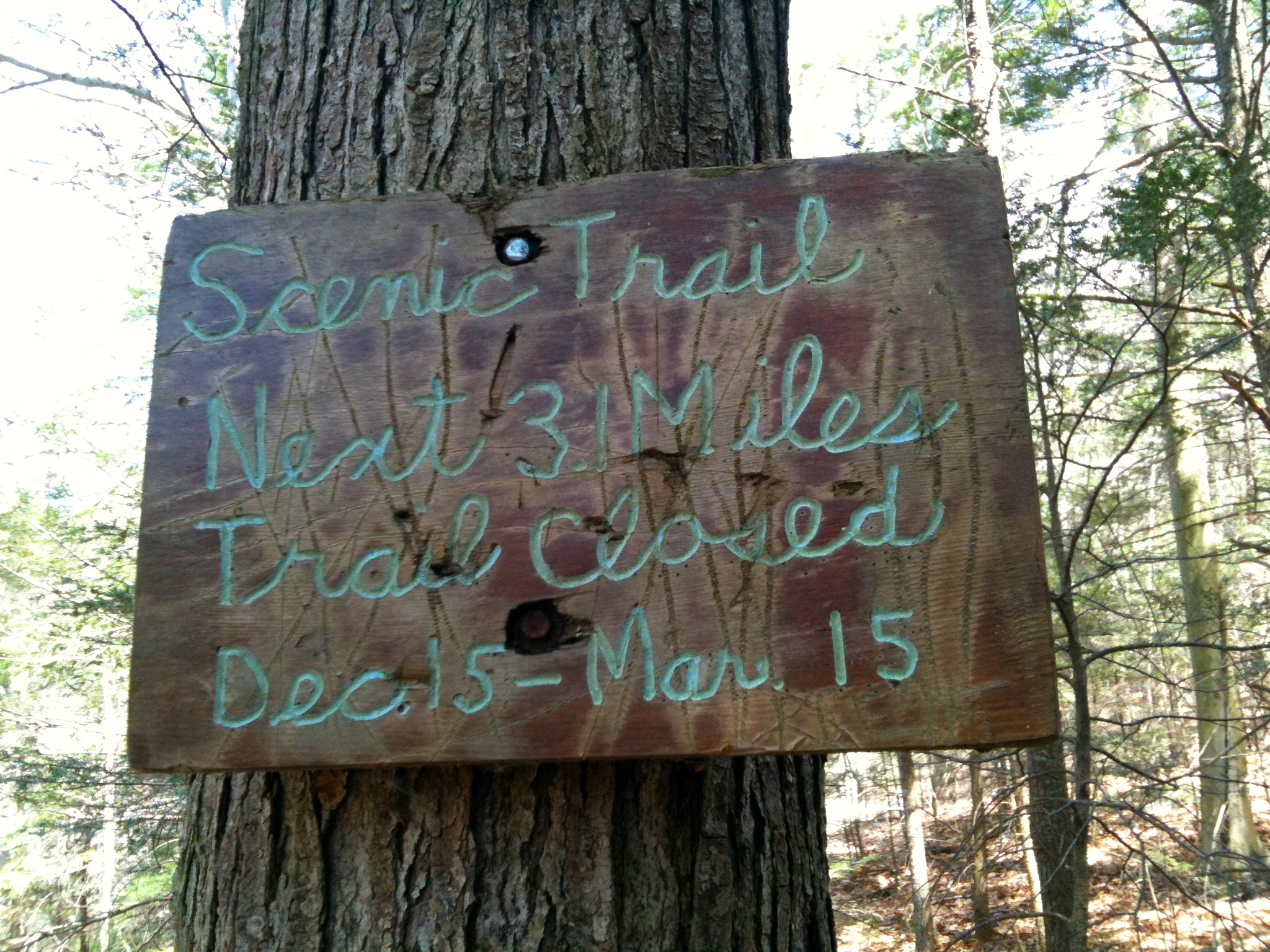
Lillinonah Trail Scenic Trail and season notice sign.

The squarish loop known as Lillinonah Trail extends from its eastern terminus at the junction of Hanover Road and Pond Brook Road in Newtown along the eastern bank of the Housatonic River inlet known as Pond brook until it turns north-east at Lake Lillinonah.

The Lillinonah Trail is primarily used for hiking, backpacking, picnicking, and in the winter, snowshoeing.

Portions of the trail are suitable for, and are used for, cross-country skiing. Site-specific activities enjoyed along the route include hunting (very limited), fishing, horseback riding, bouldering and rock climbing (limited). There are signs at the trail heads forbidding mountain biking but they are periodically ignored.

=== Trail route ===
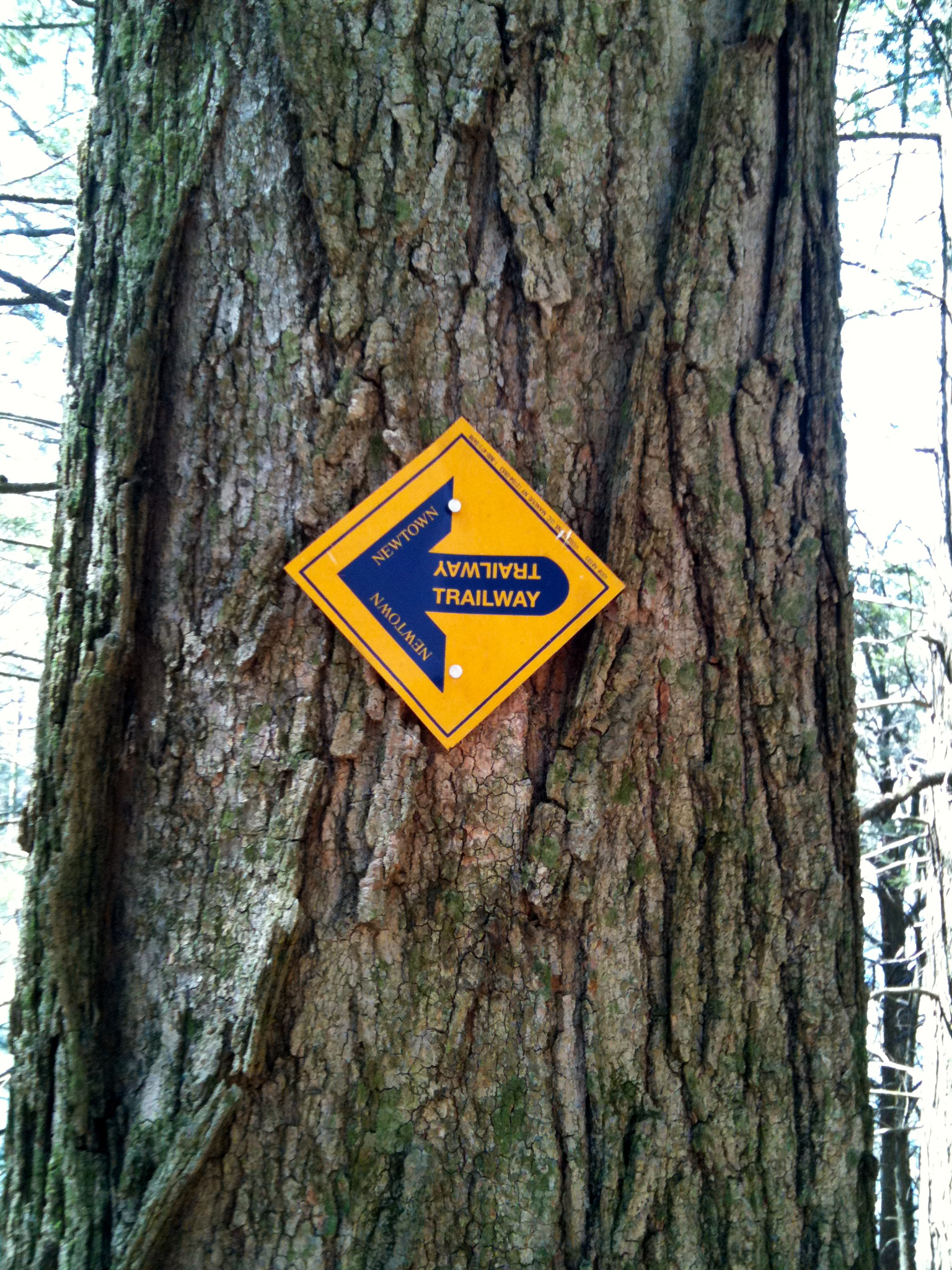
Newton Forest Association Sign marking Al's Trail on the Lillinonah Trail

The western section of the Lillinonah Trail parallels Pond Brook on high eastern bank running south to north. The northern Lillinonah trail section follows the Housatonic River/Lake Lillinonah from west to east but turns inland to the southeast before the junction of the Housatonic River with the Shepaug River. Inland the trail traverses a hill to a high point of 480 feet and descends south-east until it reaches the western bank of the Housatonic River/Lake Lillinonah. The eastern section of the trail follows the western bank of the Housatonic River/Lake Lillinonah until just before a point on the shore to which is anchored a line of buoys to the Shepaug Dam at the southern end of Lake Lillinonah. The southern section of the Lillinonah Trail begins at the Paugussett State Forest parking lot at the end of Echo Valley Road. After skirting a private property lot it generally travel north and west along the Paugussett State Forest upper block boundary.

The Lillinonah Trail traverses several high river bank ridges with scenic views of the Housatonic River though they may be obscured by foliage, particularly in the summer. This 3.2 mile section of the trail near the river banks is designated a 'scenic trail' by the Connecticut Department of Environment Protection (and who close it from December 15 to March 15).

Several year-round and seasonal streams cut across the trail to flow into the Housatonic River.

The Lillinonah Trail travels near several "milepost" markers labeled with the letters "CL&P" (Connecticut Light and Power).

A few miles south of Lillinonah Trail on the Housatonic River can be found the Lake Zoar Blue-Blazed Trails which span both the west and east banks of Lake Zoar. The Zoar Trail is on the western bank of Lake Zoar in the lower block of the Paugussett State Forest in Newtown. The Kettletown State Park trails are on the eastern bank of Lake Zoar, primarily in Kettletown State Park (in Southbury.

'Al's Trail' overlaps with the Lillinonah Trail for the first four miles of each. The two separate shortly before the Lillinonah Trail reaches the Paugussett State Forest parking lot at the end of Echo Valley Road. Al's Trail continues for six more miles through Newtown, Connecticut, ending near the grounds of the former state mental institution known as "Fairfield Hills" (AKA Fairfield State Hospital). Newtown currently (2010) has a proposal to turn these former grounds into a town recreational with multi-use trails.

There are marked and unmarked trails and dirt forest roads which cross the interior of the Paugussett State Forest Upper Block, some of which connect to the Lillinonah Trail. The Polly Brody Fire Road is a wide dirt road which arcs from the end of Echo Valley Road through the center of the state forest block. A shared-use trail (mountain biking, horseback, & hiking) known as the Upper Gussy Trail has been built by members of the CT Chapter of the New England Mountain Bike Association and Newtown Bridle Lands Association. The Upper Gussy Trail is a State of Connecticut Department of Environmental Protection officially approved shared-use trail. The State DEP now has an official Upper Paugussett Trails Map with all the recognized trails in the forest. There are connectors between these trails (including the White Trail).

=== Trail communities ===
The official Blue-Blazed Lillinonah Trail passes through land only located within the municipality of Newtown, Connecticut.

The town of Southbury, Connecticut is visible from the trail across Lake Lillinonah on the eastern bank.

The border between Newtown and Southbury, as well as the border between Fairfield and New Haven counties, splits down the middle of Lake Lillinonah.

== Landscape, geology, and natural environment ==
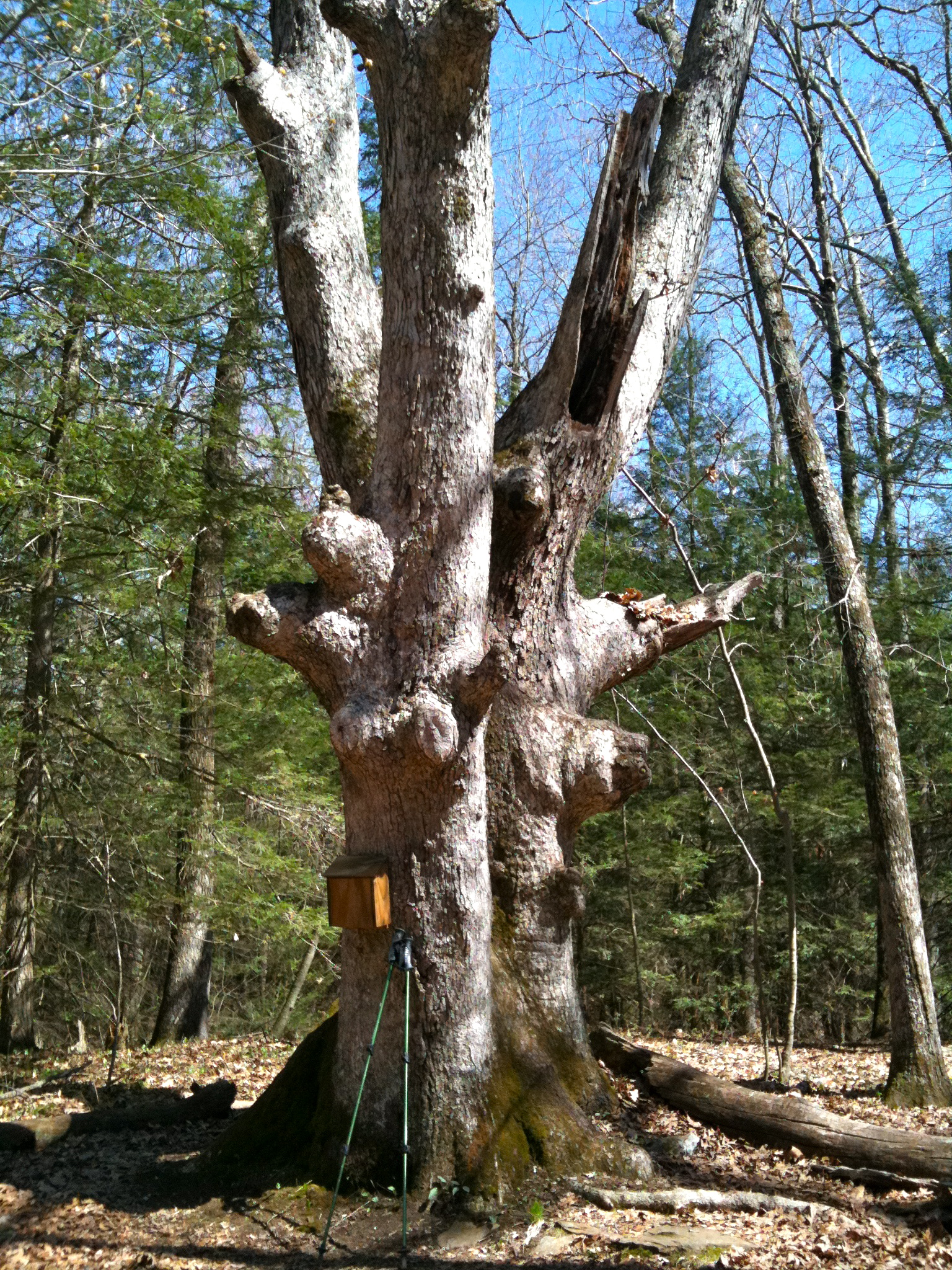
Great Oak Tree with visitor's guestbook at northern high point.

== History and folklore ==
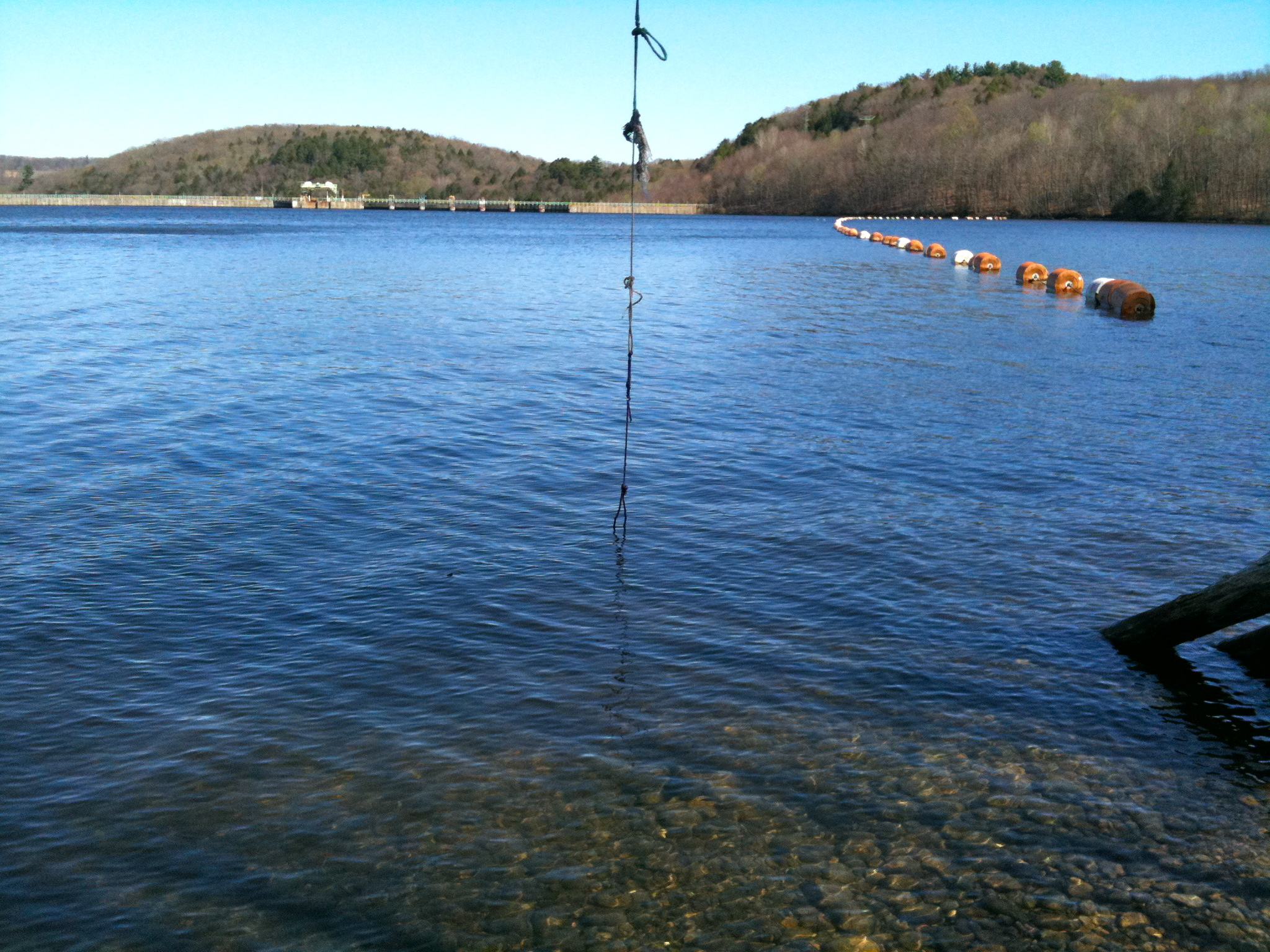
South Lake Lillinonah facing the Shepaug Dam

The Lillinonah Blue-Blazed Trail was created in the early 1940s by the Connecticut Forest and Park Association.

The route of the original and planned (longer) Lillinonah trail blazed can be seen in the Connecticut Forest and Park Association 1940 Connecticut Walk Book map of major trails.

In 1872 the Shepaug, Litchfield and Northern Railroad (also known as the "Great Northern") from Bethel, Connecticut (by way of Hawleyville) ran track along Pond Brook to a Housatonic River bridge north to the Shepaug Valley (from which it wended a path to Litchfield, Connecticut). The New York, New Haven and Hartford Railroad (AKA "The New Haven") leased the 32 mile long Shepaug line from 1892 to 1947. A twice-daily passenger service was discontinued in the 1930s and the line was completely shut down in 1948 at the request of the New York, New Haven and Hartford Railroad.

=== Origin and name ===
Lake Lillinonah is named for the legend of a tragic romance between a Native American (of the Pootatuck / Paugussett tribe) maiden and a European (white) colonist.

The Pootatuck (often spelled Pohtatuck in colonial era documents and related to the name Potatuck) were a branch of the Paugussett tribe who lived along the Housatonic and Pootatuck Rivers near the Sandy Hook area of Newtown, Connecticut (an area which was called "Pohtatuck" before the name was changed to "Sandy Hook"). It is unknown if a permanent Native American settlement existed at or near the upper block of Paugussett State Forest. Newtown, known as Quanneapague, was purchased from the Pohtatuck in 1705 and incorporated as a town in 1711. Most of the original settlers were farmers from Stratford and Milford, Connecticut.

Paugussett is the name of an Algonquian-speaking native American tribe and sachemdom existing in southwestern Connecticut in the 17th century. Derby Connecticut was once known as "Paugussett" before it was renamed in 1675.

Paugussett villages existed in Bridgeport, Trumbull, Stratford, Shelton, Monroe and Oxford in Fairfield County as well as in what is now Milford, Orange, Woodbridge, Beacon Falls, Derby and Naugatuck in New Haven County, Connecticut. Pootatuck (AKA Potatuck) was a village of the Paugussett where the Pootatuck River is today in Newtown.

Descendants of the southeast Fairfield County Connecticut branch of the Paugussett tribe (known as the "Golden Hill" Paugussetts) today have a reservation in Colchester Connecticut (New London County) as well as a small land holding in the Nichols section of Stratford, Connecticut.

=== Historic sites ===
Lake Lillinonah was created in 1955 by damming the Housatonic River via the construction of the Shepaug Dam (another "Shepaug Reservoir Dam" stands upstream on the Shepaug River and is owned by the City of Waterbury, Connecticut) to produce hydro-electric power. The reservoir was prematurely and accidentally flooded by Hurricane Diane on August 19, 1955, a few weeks before the dam was scheduled to commence operation. The lake was drained and refilled again beginning on September 27, 1955, by closing the gates on the new dam.

In 1985 Shepaug Dam owners opened a free public observation site in Southbury, Connecticut near the hydroelectric generation plant for viewing Lake Lillinonah's Bald Eagles (and other predatory bird species such as hawks). Reservations are required and the season is limited to the last weekend in December until March 17 on Wednesdays, Saturdays and Sundays from 9 a.m. until 1 p.m.

== Hiking the trail ==
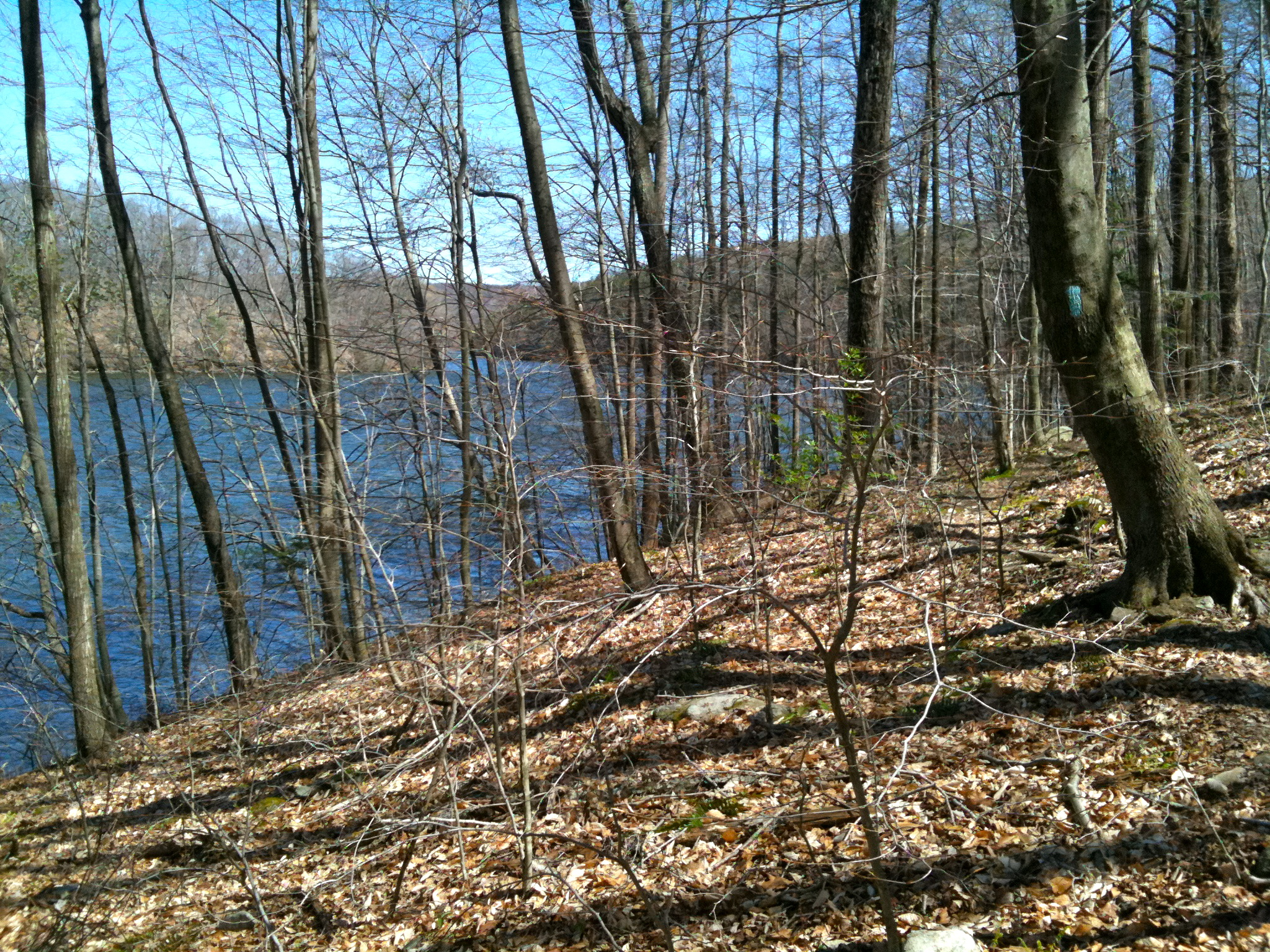
Lake Lillinonah seen from the Lillinonah Trail through the trees.

The mainline Lillinonah trail is blazed with blue rectangles. It is regularly maintained, and is considered easy hiking, with very few sections of rugged and moderately difficult hiking (notably just the climb up to the northern high point near the great Oak tree).

Much of the Lillinonah Trail is close to water and though some swamp areas inland are prone to flooding the trail along the lake shore is mostly on very high ground. There are no camping facilities along the trail and camping is prohibited in the Paugussett State Forest Upper Block. Trail descriptions are available from a number of commercial and non-commercial sources, and a complete guidebook is published by the Connecticut Forest and Park Association

Weather along the route is typical of Connecticut. Conditions on exposed ridge tops and summits may be harsher during cold or stormy weather. Lightning is a hazard on exposed summits and ledges during thunderstorms. Snow is common in the winter and may necessitate the use of snowshoes. Ice can form on exposed ledges and summits, making hiking dangerous without special equipment.

Extensive flooding in ponds, puddles and streams may occur in the late winter or early spring, overflowing into the trail and causing very muddy conditions. In this case fairly high waterproof boots are recommended. Some parts of the trail follow forest roads which often contain ruts from ATVs and four-wheel drive vehicles.

Biting insects can be bothersome during warm weather. Parasitic deer ticks (which are known to carry Lyme disease) are a potential hazard.

Only the trail heads are close to (rural) civilization (and paved roads). There is only one very short dirt road walk—along Echo Valley Road.

Almost all of the trail is adjacent to, or is on lands where hunting and the use of firearms are permitted. Wearing bright orange clothing during the hunting season (Fall through December) is recommended. Note that much of the trail is closed from December 15 to March 15 for the protection of Eagles during their nesting season.

== Conservation and maintenance of the trail corridor ==
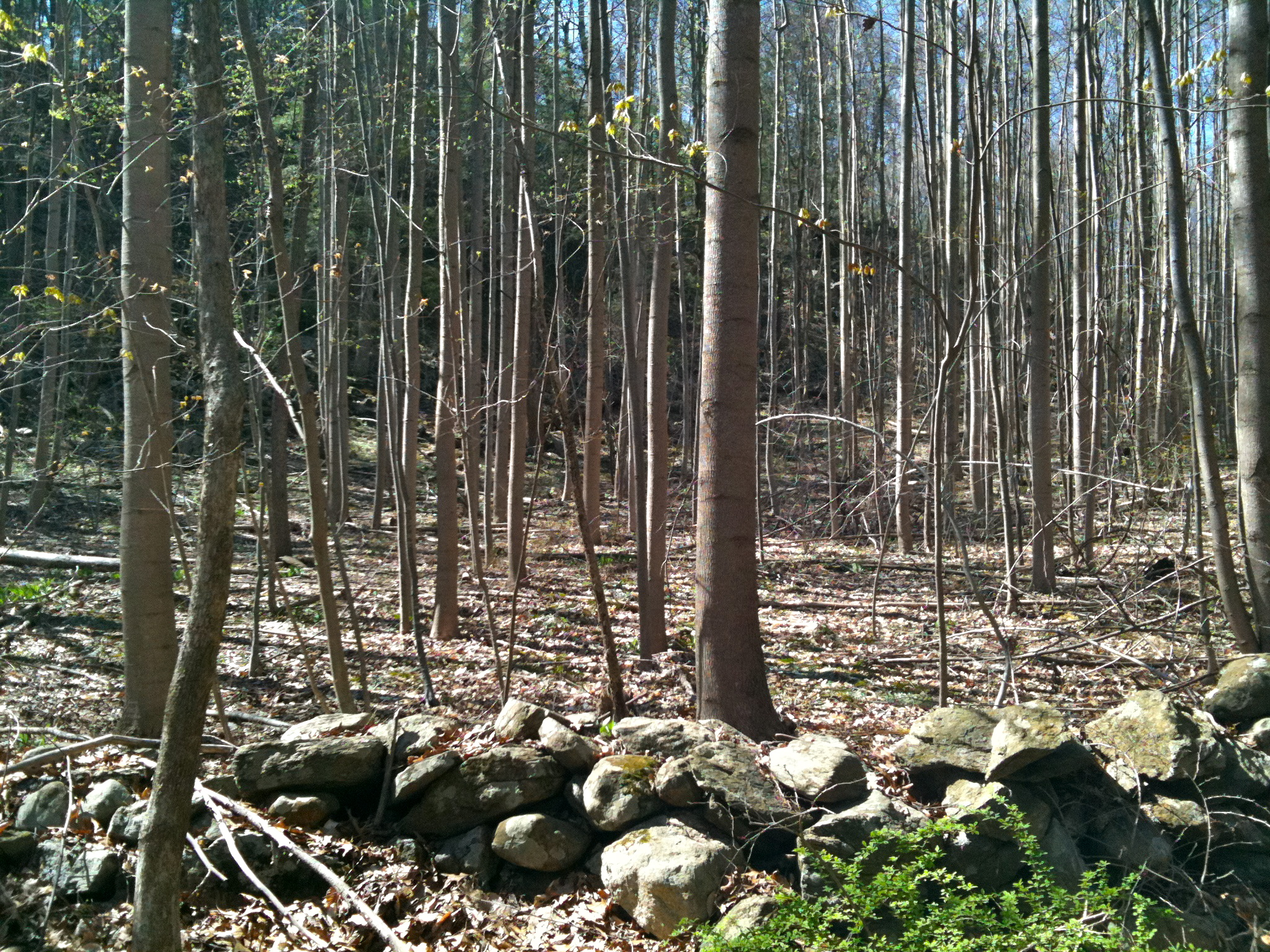
A new stand of fast growing poplar trees managed by the Connecticut State Department of Environmental Protection's Forestry division.

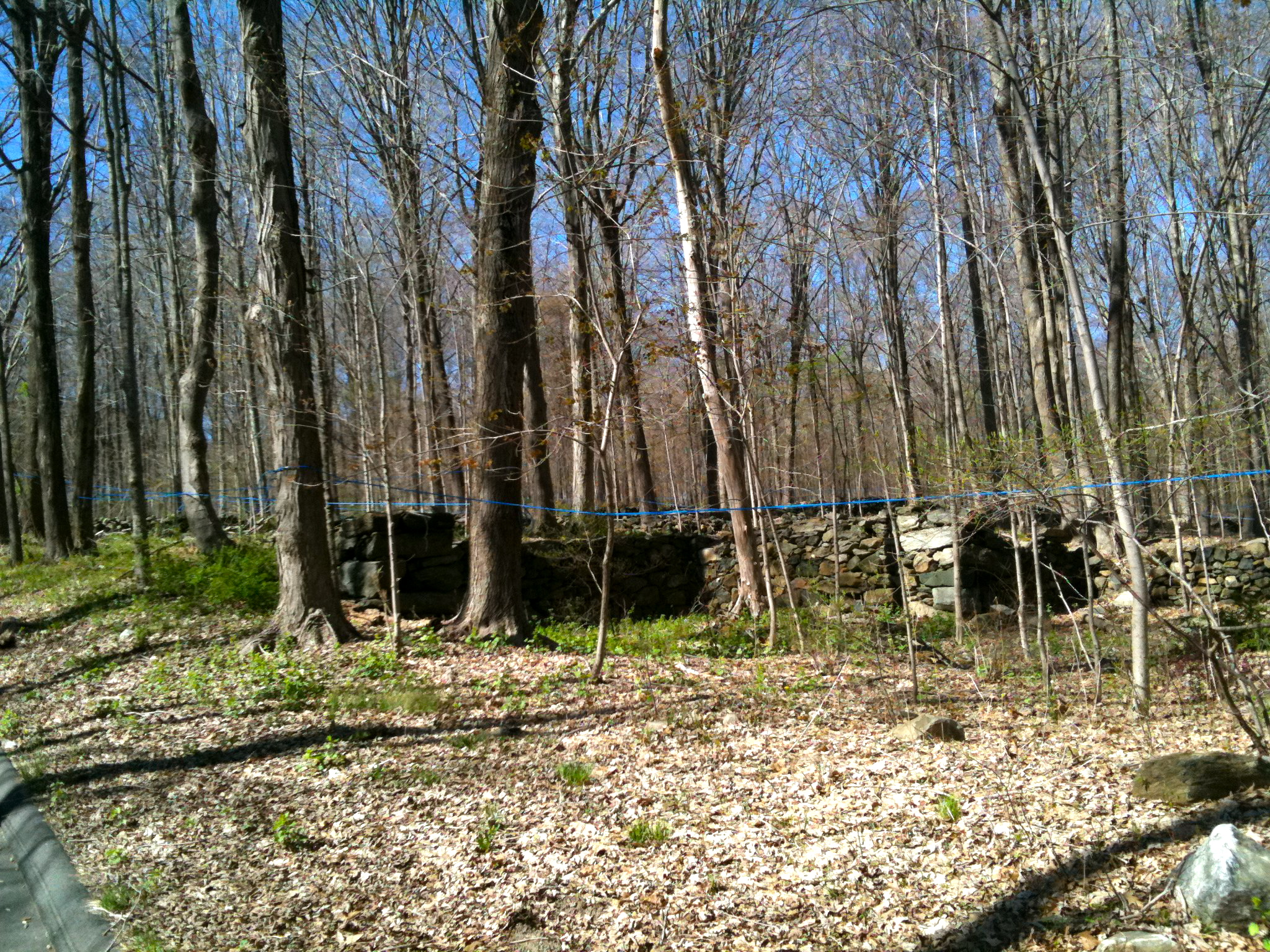
A demonstration "Sugarbush" tubing system connecting high yield maple sugar trees is managed by the Connecticut State Department of Environmental Protection's Forestry division in a forest dotted with old stone house foundations off Alberts Hill Road.

== See also ==
- Blue-Blazed Trails
- History of Newtown, Connecticut
