= Nuuluk Island =

Island in Avannaata, Greenland

Nuuluk
- Location within Greenland

Geography
- Location: Greenland
- Coordinates: 73°32′40″N 55°58′00″W
- Archipelago: Upernavik Archipelago

Administration
- Greenland
- Municipality: Avannaata

Nuuluk Island (old spelling: Nûluk) is an uninhabited island in Avannaata municipality in northwestern Greenland.

== Geography ==
Nuuluk Island is located in Tasiusaq Bay, in the north-central part of Upernavik Archipelago, on the shores of the inner reaches of Kangerlussuaq Icefjord, which in the northeast separates it from Giesecke Glacier on the mainland of Greenland.

The island is separated from Anarusuk Island in the southeast by a small Ikerasaarsuk channel. The inner waterways of Tasiusaq Bay separate it from Qallunaat Island in the northwest, Saattorsuaq Island in the west, and Aappilattoq Island in the south.

=== Coastline ===
The island's highest point is a 390 m (1,280 ft) hill in the southern part of the island. Its coastline is undeveloped, with Iterlissuaq bay the only indentation in the north.
