= Ikerasak Strait =

Strait in Avannaata, Greenland

Coordinates: 73°23′N 56°11′W

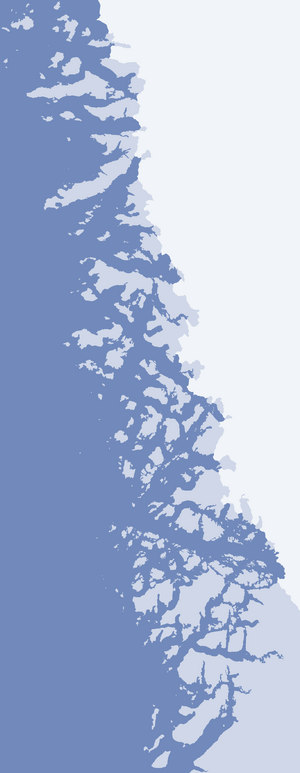
Ikerasak Strait (Upernavik Archipelago)

Ikerasak Strait is a strait in the Avannaata municipality in northwestern Greenland.

== Geography ==
The strait is located in central Tasiusaq Bay. It separates Uigorlersuaq Island in the north from Paagussat Island in the south, and from Tasiusaq Island in the east.
