= Pagnussat =

Pagnussat, also found in the variants Pagnusat, Pagnussatt and Pagnussatti, is a surname from Trentino and Belluno, Northeast Italy, possibly derived from a place name Pagnussa or a given name Pagnus. Notable people with the surname include:

- Maurizio Pagnussat (born 1955), Italian TV director
- Tiago Pagnussat (born 1990), Brazilian footballer

== See also ==
- Paagussat
