= Alanngorsuup Sermia =

Glacier in Greenland

- Interactive map of Alanngorsuup Sermia
- Location: Upernavik Archipelago, Greenland
- Coordinates: 73°09′30″N 55°00′00″W
- Terminus: Tasiusaq Bay

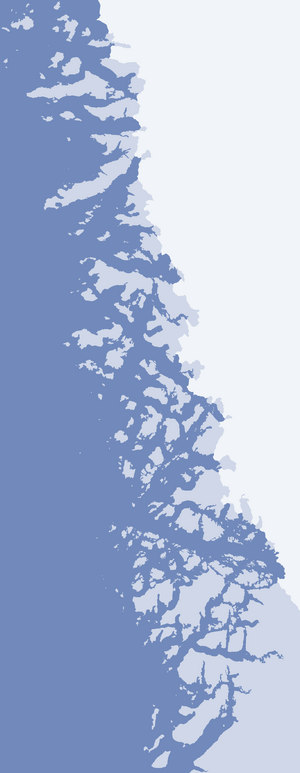
Alanngorsuup Sermia (Upernavik Archipelago)

Alanngorsuup Sermia (old spelling: Alángorsûp Sermia) is a tidewater glacier in Avannaata municipality on the northwestern shore of Greenland. It drains the Greenland ice sheet northwestwards into Tasiusaq Bay. The glacier front is located to the south of the Nunatarsuaq nunatak, and to the north of the Qassersuaq Peninsula. Nunatakassaup Sermia, a sibling glacier to the north, drains the icesheet into the same point at the inner end of Tasiusaq Bay.
