= Kangaarsuk Island =

Island in Greenland

Kangaarsuk
- Location within Greenland

Geography
- Location: Greenland
- Coordinates: 73°15′45″N 56°06′30″W
- Archipelago: Upernavik Archipelago

Administration
- Greenland
- Municipality: Avannaata

Kangaarsuk Island (old spelling: Kangârssuk) is an uninhabited island in Avannaata municipality in northwestern Greenland.

== Geography ==
Kangaarsuk Island is located in the outer belt of islands in Tasiusaq Bay, in the central part of Upernavik Archipelago. The inner waterways of the bay separate it from Illunnguit Island in the northwest, and from Tasiusaq Island in the north. It is one of the low-lying islands buffering Tasiusaq Island from the west. The highest point on the island is an unnamed 170 m (560 ft) point in the center.
