= Tasiusaq Island =

Island in Avannaata, Greenland

Tasiusaq
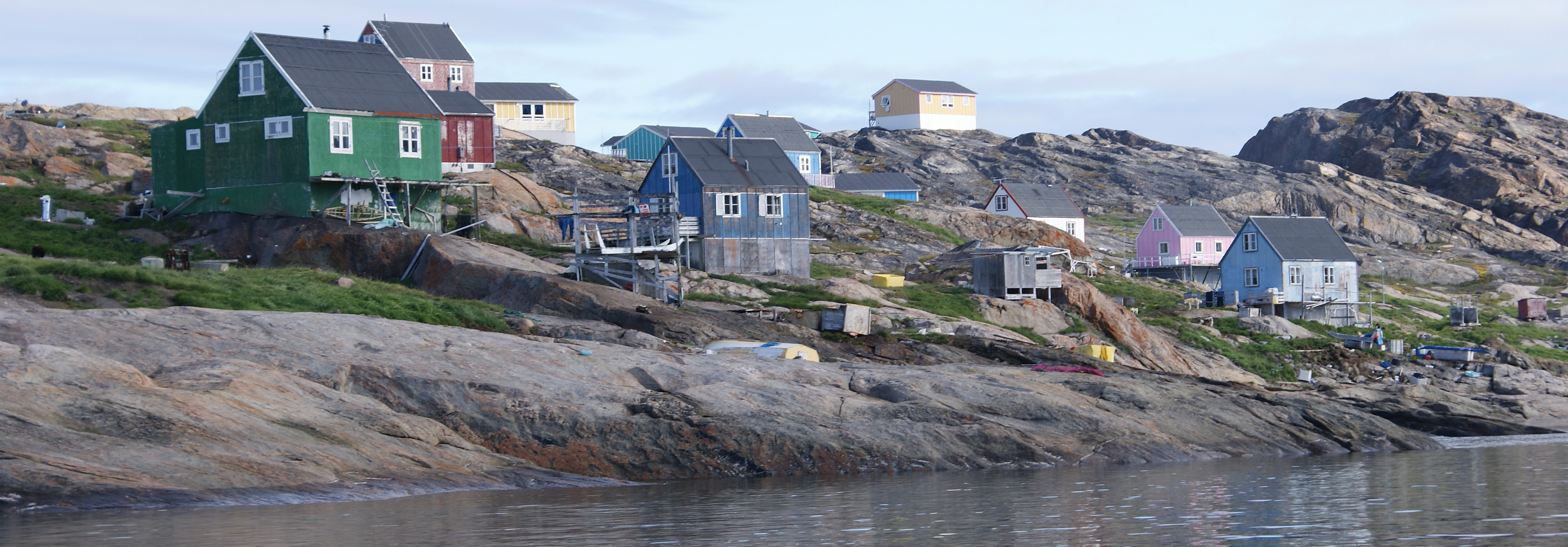
- Tasiusaq settlement

- Location within Greenland

Geography
- Location: Greenland
- Coordinates: 73°21′N 55°57′W
- Archipelago: Upernavik Archipelago

Administration
- Greenland
- Municipality: Avannaata

Tasiusaq Island (old spelling: Tasiussaq) is an island in Avannaata municipality in northwestern Greenland, home to the Tasiusaq settlement.

== Geography ==
Tasiusaq Island is located in the outer belt of islands in Tasiusaq Bay, in the central part of Upernavik Archipelago. In the northwest, the Ikerasak Strait separates it from Uigorlersuaq Island. The inner waterways of the bay separate it from Aappilattoq Island and Anarusuk Island in the northeast. The Simiuttap Ikerasaa strait, with a small skerry in the middle separates Tasiusaq from the mountainous Qaqaarissorsuaq Island in the east. The outer waterways of Tasiusaq Bay separate the island from small skerries and Kangaarsuk Island in the south, from Illunguit Island in the southwest, and from Paagussat Island in the west.

Tasiusaq Island is mountainous in its center. Tunullersuaq is the highest mountain, at 535 m (1,755 ft). The Tasiusaq village is located in the lower part of the island, at the shores of one of the small bays indenting the coastline in the northwest, near Nuunnguaq, the western cape.

=== Promontories ===
Name	Direction	Latitude N	Longitude W
Uillut	Northern Cape	73°24′44″	56°01′10″
(none)	Northeastern Cape	73°22′40″	55°48′50″
Sagfiorfik	Southern Cape	73°17′28″	55°57′55″
Inatsiait	Southwestern Cape	73°17′53″	56°08′15″
Nuunnguaq	Western Cape	73°21′57″	56°04′58″
