= Aukarnersuaq Island =

Island in Greenland

Aukarnersuaq
- Location within Greenland

Geography
- Location: Greenland
- Coordinates: 73°22′N 55°24′W
- Archipelago: Upernavik Archipelago

Administration
- Greenland
- Municipality: Avannaata

Aukarnersuaq Island (old spelling: Aukarnerssuaq) is an uninhabited island in Avannaata municipality in northwestern Greenland.

== Geography ==
Aukernersuaq Island is located in Tasiusaq Bay, in the north-central part of Upernavik Archipelago, on the shores of Qaaneq fjord, the innermost reaches of Kangerlussuaq Icefjord. In the north, Kangerlussuaq Icefjord separates the island from Kakiffait Sermiat, the southern tongue of Giesecke Glacier on the mainland of Greenland.

The innermost waterways of Tasiusaq Bay separate Aukarnersuaq from the Nunatarsuaq nunatak on the mainland in the southeast, from Qaqaarissorsuaq Island in the southwest, and Anarusuk Island in the northwest. The highest point on Aukarnersuaq Island is a 450 m (1,480 ft), unnamed peak in the southern part of the island.
