= Paugussett State Forest =

Forest in the United States of America

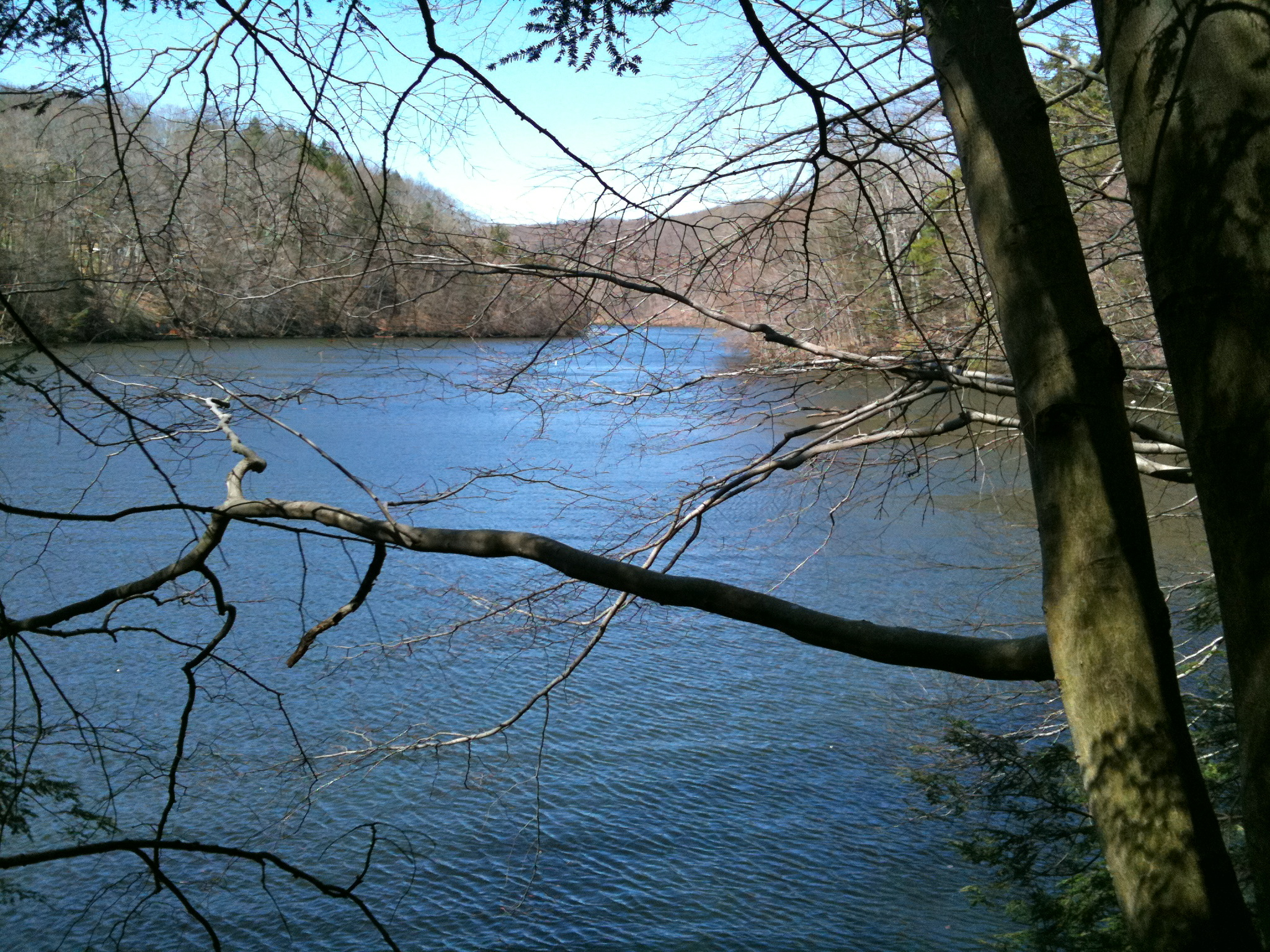
- Pond Brook inlet in the state forest's Upper Block

- Location within Connecticut Location within the United States
- Location: Newtown, Connecticut, United States
- Coordinates: 41°24′47″N 73°12′24″W
- Area: 1,947 acres (788 ha)
- Elevation: 371 ft (113 m)
- Established: 1940s
- Administrator: Connecticut Department of Energy and Environmental Protection
- Website: Paugussett State Forest

Paugussett State Forest is a Connecticut state forest with two separate sections located on impoundments of the Housatonic River in the town of Newtown. The forest's Upper Block encompasses approximately 800 acres (320 ha) on the western shore of Lake Lillinonah. It offers boating access to the river and hiking on the blue-blazed Lillinonah Trail. The forest's Lower Block encompasses approximately 1,200 acres (490 ha) on the western shore of Lake Zoar and offers hiking on the blue-blazed Zoar Trail.
