= Simiuttap Ikerasaa =

Strait in Avannaata, Greenland

Coordinates: 73°19′N 55°51′W

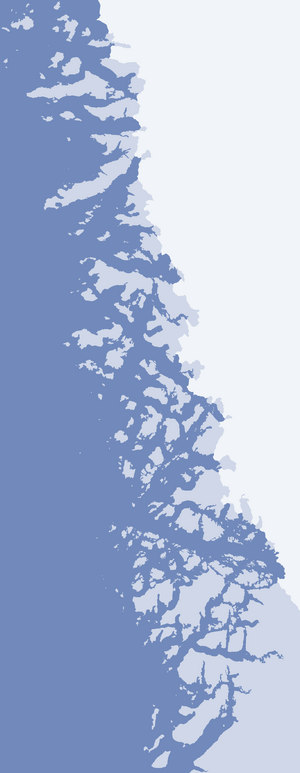
Simiuttap Ikerasaa (Upernavik Archipelago)

Simiuttap Ikerasaa (old spelling: Simiútap Ikerasâ) is a strait in Avannaata municipality in northwestern Greenland.

== Geography ==
The strait is located in central Tasiusaq Bay. With a small Simiutaq skerry in the middle, the strait separates Tasiusaq Island in the west, from the mountainous Qaqaarissorsuaq Island in the east.
