= Aappilattoq Island (Tasiusaq Bay) =

Island in Avannaata, Greenland

Aappilattoq
- Location within Greenland

Geography
- Location: Greenland
- Coordinates: 73°27′30″N 55°54′00″W
- Archipelago: Upernavik Archipelago

Administration
- Greenland
- Municipality: Avannaata

Aappilattoq Island (old spelling: Augpilagtoq) is an uninhabited island in the Avannaata municipality in northwestern Greenland. It is one of two islands of the same name in the Upernavik Archipelago.

== Geography ==
Aappilattoq Island is located in Tasiusaq Bay, in the north-central part of Upernavik Archipelago, in the inner band of uninhabited islands. The island is separated from Anarusuk Island in the east by a small Ikerasaarsuk channel. The inner waterways of Tasiusaq Bay separate it from Nuuluk Island and Saattorsuaq Island in the north, and from Tasiusaq Island in the south.

The highest point on the island is an unnamed peak of 460 m (1,510 ft) in the central part of the island. The coastline of the island is undeveloped.
