= Mattaangassut Island =

Island in Avannaata, Greenland

Mattaangassut
- Location within Greenland

Geography
- Location: Greenland
- Coordinates: 73°33′20″N 56°44′00″W
- Archipelago: Upernavik Archipelago

Administration
- Greenland
- Municipality: Avannaata

Mattaangassut Island (old spelling: Mátângassut) is an uninhabited island in Avannaata municipality in northwestern Greenland.

== Geography ==
Mattaangassut Island is located in Tasiusaq Bay, in the north-central part of Upernavik Archipelago. It is separated from Nutaarmiut Island in the southeast by a narrow Ikerasakassak strait, and from Qallunaat Island in the east by the waterways of Tasiusaq Bay.
