= Nunatarsuaq (Tasiusaq Bay) =

Mountain in Avannaata, Greenland

Coordinates: 73°17′N 55°15′W

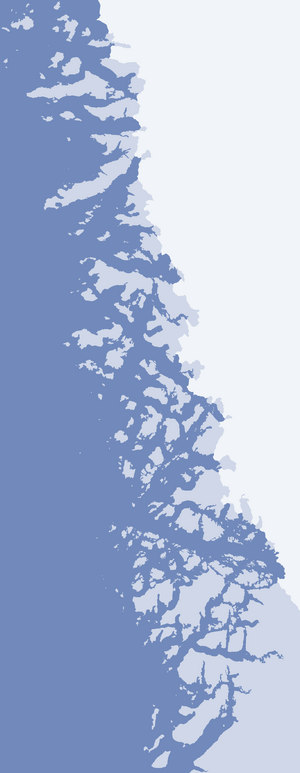
Nunatarsuaq (Tasiusaq Bay, Upernavik Archipelago)

Nunatarsuaq (old spelling: Nunatarssuaq) is a nunatak (Greenlandic: nunataq) in Avannaata municipality in northwestern Greenland.

== Geography ==
Nunatarsuaq is one of several nunataks in the Upernavik Archipelago, and one of the few named nunataks in Tasiusaq Bay. To the north, it is bounded by Qaaneq fjord, the innermost waterway of Kangerlussuaq Icefjord. To the west, the innermost waterways of Tasiusaq Bay separate it from Aukarnersuaq Island. To the southeast, the Nunatakassaup Sermia glacier drains the Greenland ice sheet (Greenlandic: Sermersuaq) into Tasiusaq Bay.

The highest point on the island is an unnamed peak of 653 m (2,142 ft).
