= Uigorlersuaq Island =

Island in Avannaata, Greenland

Uigorlersuaq
- Location within Greenland

Geography
- Location: Greenland
- Coordinates: 73°24′45″N 56°12′00″W
- Archipelago: Upernavik Archipelago

Administration
- Greenland
- Municipality: Avannaata

Uigorlersuaq Island (old spelling: Uigordlerssuaq) is an uninhabited island in Avannaata municipality in northwestern Greenland.

== Geography ==
Uigorlersuaq Island is located in the outer belt of islands in Tasiusaq Bay, in the central part of Upernavik Archipelago. In the northwest, it is separated from a smaller Uigorle Island by the inner waterways of the bay. In the southeast, Ikerasak Strait separates it from Tasiusaq Island and Paagussat Island. It is one of the low-lying islands buffering Tasiusaq Island from the west. The highest point on the island is an unnamed 250 m (820 ft) peak in the northern part of the island.
