= Qaqaarissorsuaq Island =

Island in Avannaata, Greenland

Qaqaarissorsuaq
- Location within Greenland

Geography
- Location: Greenland
- Coordinates: 73°19′30″N 55°41′00″W
- Archipelago: Upernavik Archipelago

Administration
- Greenland
- Municipality: Avannaata

Qaqaarissorsuaq Island (old spelling: Qaqârigssorssuaq) is an uninhabited island in Avannaata municipality in northwestern Greenland.

== Geography ==
The egg-shaped Qaqaarissorsuaq Island is located in Tasiusaq Bay, in the central part of Upernavik Archipelago. The inner waterways of the bay separate it from the surrounding islands: Ateqanngitsorsuaq Island in the southwest, Tasiusaq Island in the west through the Simiuttap Ikerasaa strait, Anarusuk Island in the north, Aukarnersuaq Island in the northeast, and small islands and skerries in the south and southeast.

The island has an undeveloped shoreline. It is mountainous throughout, with a large lake occupying the central plateau at 230 m (750 ft). The highest point on the island is an unnamed 590 m (1,940 ft) peak in the north.
