= Anarusuk Island =

Island in Greenland

Anarusuk
- Location within Greenland

Geography
- Location: Greenland
- Coordinates: 73°28′N 55°38′W
- Archipelago: Upernavik Archipelago
- Area: 75 km^{2} (29 sq mi)
- Length: 16.4 km (10.19 mi)
- Width: 14.2 km (8.82 mi)

Administration
- Greenland
- Municipality: Avannaata

Anarusuk Island is an uninhabited island in Avannaata municipality in northwestern Greenland.

== Geography ==
Anarusuk Island is located in Tasiusaq Bay, in the north-central part of Upernavik Archipelago, on the shores of the inner reaches of Kangerlussuaq Icefjord, which in the northeast separates it from Giesecke Glacier on the mainland of Greenland.

The island is separated from Nuuluk Island in the northwest by a small Ikerasaarsuk channel, from Aappilattoq Island in the west by a small channel of the same name, and by the inner waterways of Tasiusaq Bay from Aukarnersuaq Island in the southeast and Qaqaarissorsuaq Island in the south.

=== Coastline ===
The coastline of the island is developed, with many inlets indenting the coastline in the west.
