= Qassersuit Saqqaa =

Strait of Greenland

Coordinates: 73°02′20″N 55°23′00″W

Qassersuit Saqqaa is a strait of Greenland and is located in the Upernavik Archipelago.
