= Upernavik Glacier =

Glacier in Greenland

- Interactive map of Upernavik Glacier
- Location: Upernavik Archipelago, Greenland
- Coordinates: 72°50′N 54°10′W
- Terminus: Upernavik Icefjord

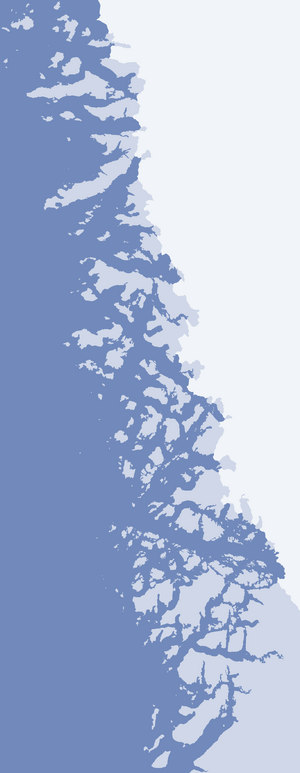
Upernavik Glacier (Upernavik Archipelago)

Upernavik Glacier (Greenlandic: Sermeq, Danish: Upernavik isstrøm) is a large tidewater glacier in Avannaata municipality on the northwestern shore of Greenland. It drains a large portion of the Greenland ice sheet westwards into Upernavik Icefjord.
