= Shepaug River =

Shepaug River (Also called Sheppang, Sheppog, Shippang, Shippaug, and Shippoack)
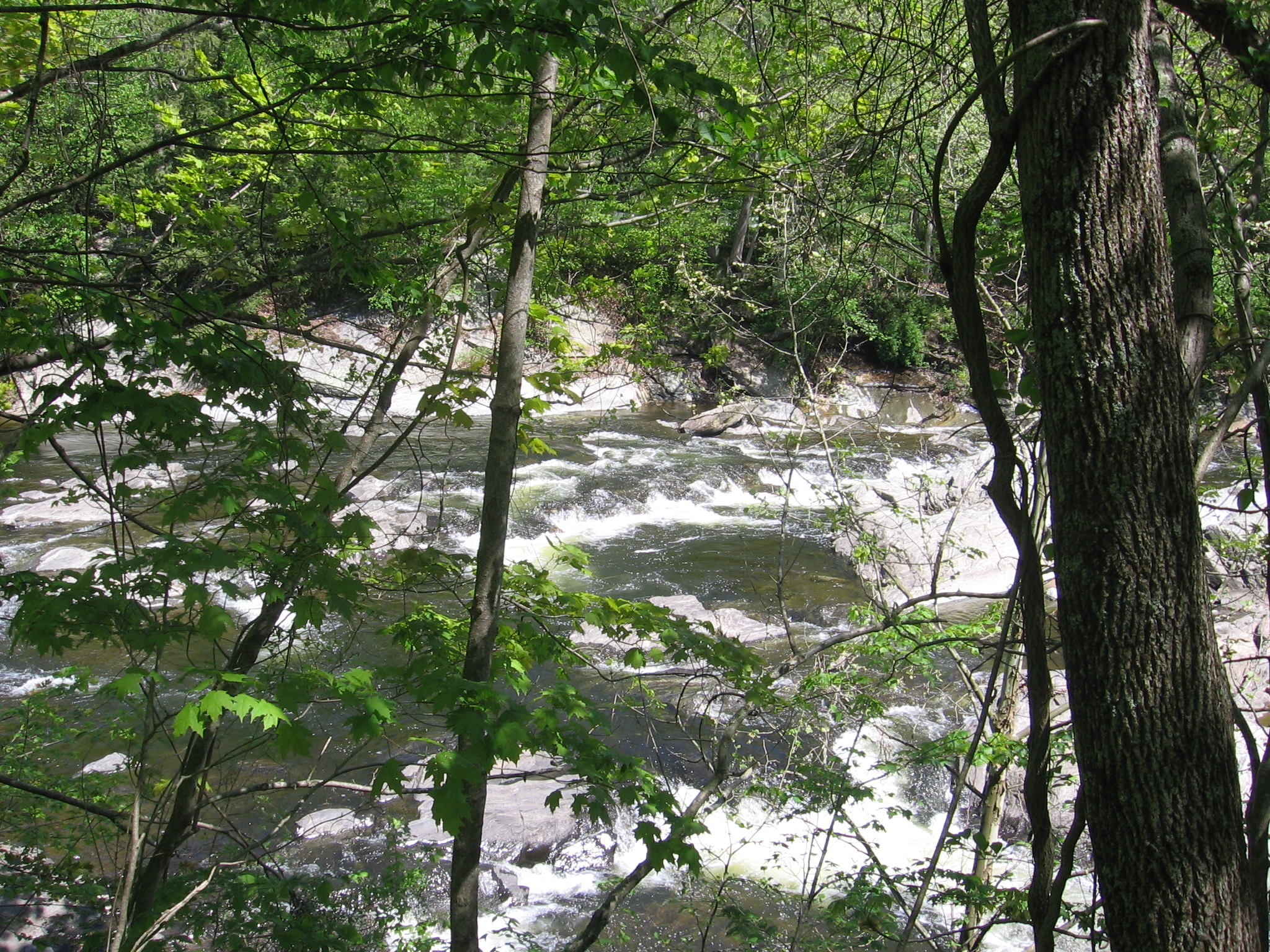
- Roxbury Falls on the Shepaug River Source and mouth of Shepaug River in Connecticut

Location
- Country: United States
- States: Connecticut
- Towns: Warren, Washington, Roxbury, Southbury

Physical characteristics
- Source: Shepaug Reservoir
  - location: Warren, Connecticut
  - coordinates: (41°43′24″N 73°17′39″W)
  - elevation: 820 ft (250 m)
- Mouth: Lake Lillinonah
  - location: Southbury, Connecticut
  - coordinates: (41°28′09″N 73°18′38″W)
  - elevation: 197 ft (60 m)
- Length: 26 mi (42 km)
- Basin size: 45,400.46 acres (18,372.91 ha)
- Width
  - maximum: 30 feet (9.1 m)

Basin features
- River system: Housatonic
- Gradient: 20 to 30 fpm

The Shepaug River is a 26.0-mile-long (41.8 km) river in western Connecticut, in the United States.

The river originates at the south end of the Shepaug Reservoir in the town of Warren. The reservoir is fed at its northern end by the West Branch Shepaug River and East Branch Shepaug River. The Shepaug runs south through Washington, Roxbury, and Southbury, where it joins the Housatonic River at Lake Lillinonah (41.5102°N 73.3190°W) dammed by the hydroelectric Shepaug Dam. The river's watershed area comprises approximately 150 square miles (390 km^{2}), which encompasses the towns of Cornwall, Goshen, Torrington, Warren, Litchfield, Washington, Morris, New Milford, Roxbury, Bridgewater, and Southbury.

The vicinity of the Shepaug River has been inhabited by humans since around 4000 B.C., though according to archaeology, there was a decline in population around 1000 B.C.

The river is a primary source of drinking water for the city of Waterbury, and has been the subject of regional litigation over how much water may be removed from the river.
