= Illunnguit Island =

Island in Avannaata, Greenland

Illunnguit
- Location within Greenland

Geography
- Location: Greenland
- Coordinates: 73°18′N 56°20′W
- Archipelago: Upernavik Archipelago

Administration
- Greenland
- Municipality: Avannaata

Illunnguit Island (old spelling: Igdlúnguit) is an uninhabited island in Avannaata municipality in northwestern Greenland.

== Geography ==
Once inhabited, the Illunnguit Island is located in the outer belt of islands in Tasiusaq Bay, in the central part of Upernavik Archipelago. The inner waterways of the bay separate it from Paagussat Island in the north, and Tasiusaq Island in the east. It is one of the low-lying islands buffering Tasiusaq Island from the west. The highest point on the island is an unnamed 310 m (1,020 ft) point in the southeast.
