= Nutaarmiut Island (Tasiusaq Bay) =

Island in Avannaata, Greenland

Nutaarmiut
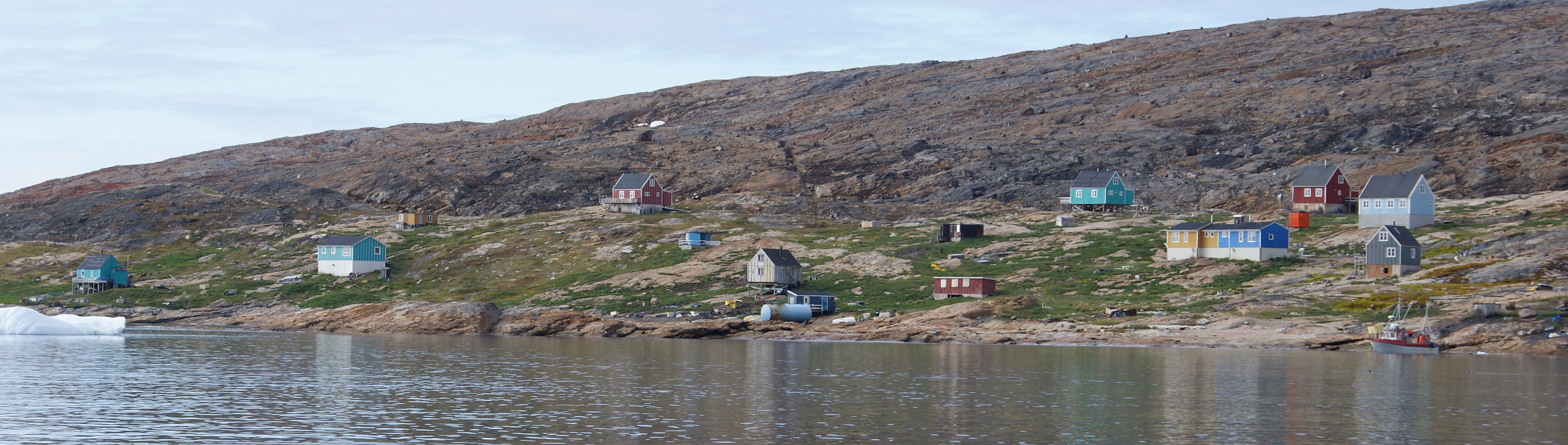
- Nutaarmiut settlement

- Location within Greenland

Geography
- Location: Greenland
- Coordinates: 73°31′N 56°31′W
- Archipelago: Upernavik Archipelago
- Area: 1.51 km^{2} (0.58 sq mi)

Administration
- Greenland
- Municipality: Avannaata

Demographics
- Population: 36 (2010)

Nutaarmiut Island (old spelling: Nutârmiut) is an island in Avannaata municipality in northwestern Greenland.

== Geography ==
Nutaarmiut Island is located in Tasiusaq Bay, in the north-central part of Upernavik Archipelago. It is separated from Mattaangassut Island in the northwest by a narrow Ikerasakassak strait, and from Qallunaat Island in the north by the waterways of Tasiusaq Bay.

== Settlement ==
The island is home to Nutaarmiut, the smallest village in the archipelago, perched on the eastern shore of the island.
