= Qallunaat Island =

Island in Avannaata, Greenland

Qallunaat
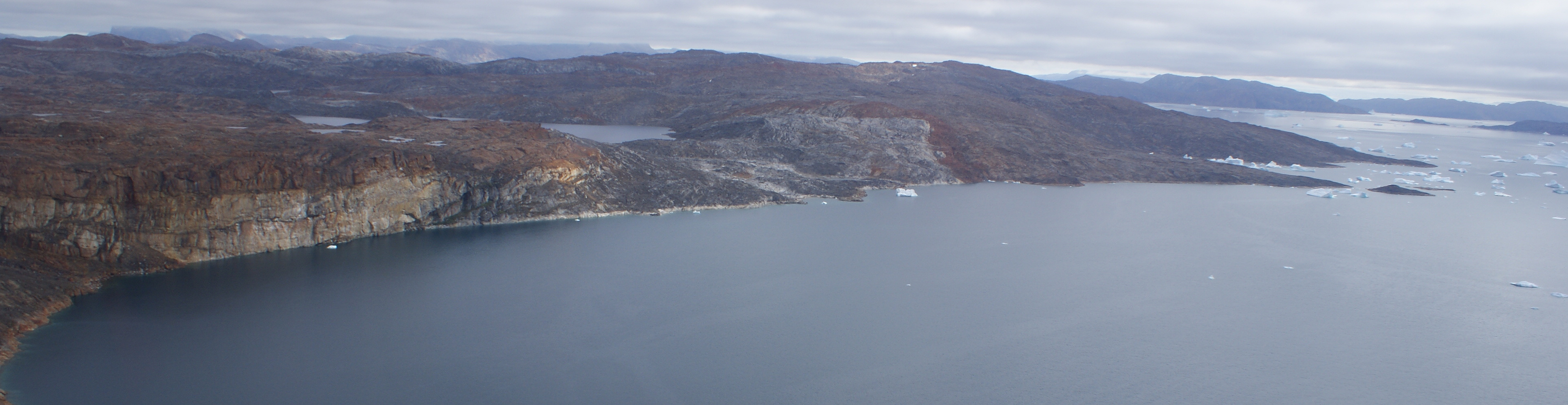
- Aerial view of Qallunaat Island

- Location within Greenland

Geography
- Location: Greenland
- Coordinates: 73°35′N 56°24′W
- Archipelago: Upernavik Archipelago

Administration
- Greenland
- Municipality: Avannaata

Qallunaat Island (old spelling: Qavdlunât) is an uninhabited island in Avannaata municipality in northwestern Greenland.

== History ==
Qallunaat Island was briefly inhabited between 1898, when the Sarfaq settlement was founded, and 1919, when it was abandoned. Sarfaq was perched on the low-lying northern end of the island, at the shores of Kangerlussuaq Icefjord.

== Geography ==
Qallunaat Island is located in Tasiusaq Bay, in the north-central part of Upernavik Archipelago. It is separated from Tuttorqortooq Island by the Qaqqakassaup Ikerasaa strait in the north, from the mainland of Greenland by the Kangerlussuaq Icefjord in the northeast, and by channels of Tasiusaq Bay from Nuuluk Island in the east, Nutaarmiut Island in the south, and Mattaangassut Island in the west.

The island is hilly in its southern part, falling to the sea with red, silver, and light-colored cliffs. At 340 m (1,120 ft), Inngik is the highest mountain on the island, located in the western part of the island.

=== Coastline ===
The coastline of the island is developed, with many inlets indenting the coastline, particularly in its northern part.

==== Promontories ====
Name	Direction	Latitude N	Longitude W
(none)	Northern Cape	73°39′44″	56°16′32″
Inussukassat	Eastern Cape	73°37′29″	56°09′50″
Ikerasaassuup Akia	Southern Cape	73°32′26″	56°23′20″
Naajamiut Nuuat	Southwestern Cape	73°33′09″	56°31′40″
Inngiup Nuua	Western Cape	73°34′46″	56°31′10″

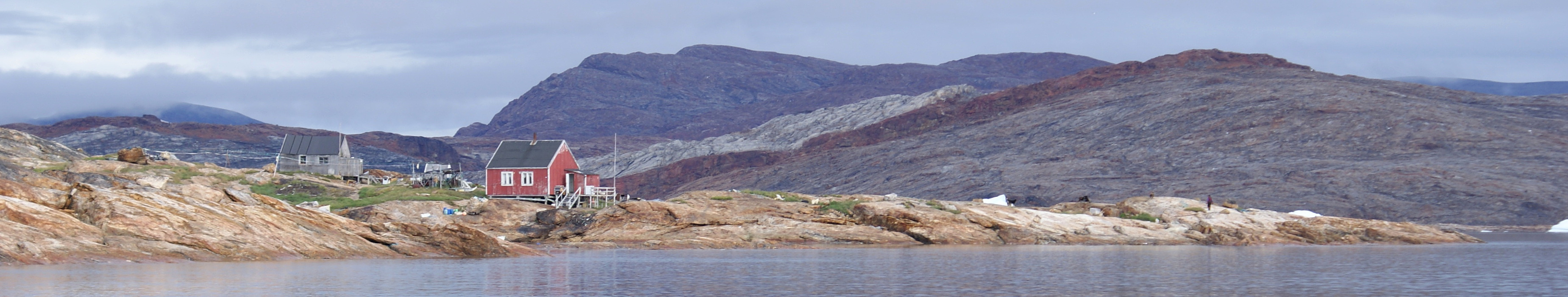
The former settlement of Ikerasaarsuk and Qallunaat Island behind
