= Qassersuit =

Mountain in Greenland

Qassersuit is a mountain of Greenland. It is located in the Upernavik Archipelago.
