= Shepaug Dam =

Coordinates: 41°26′53″N 73°17′44″W

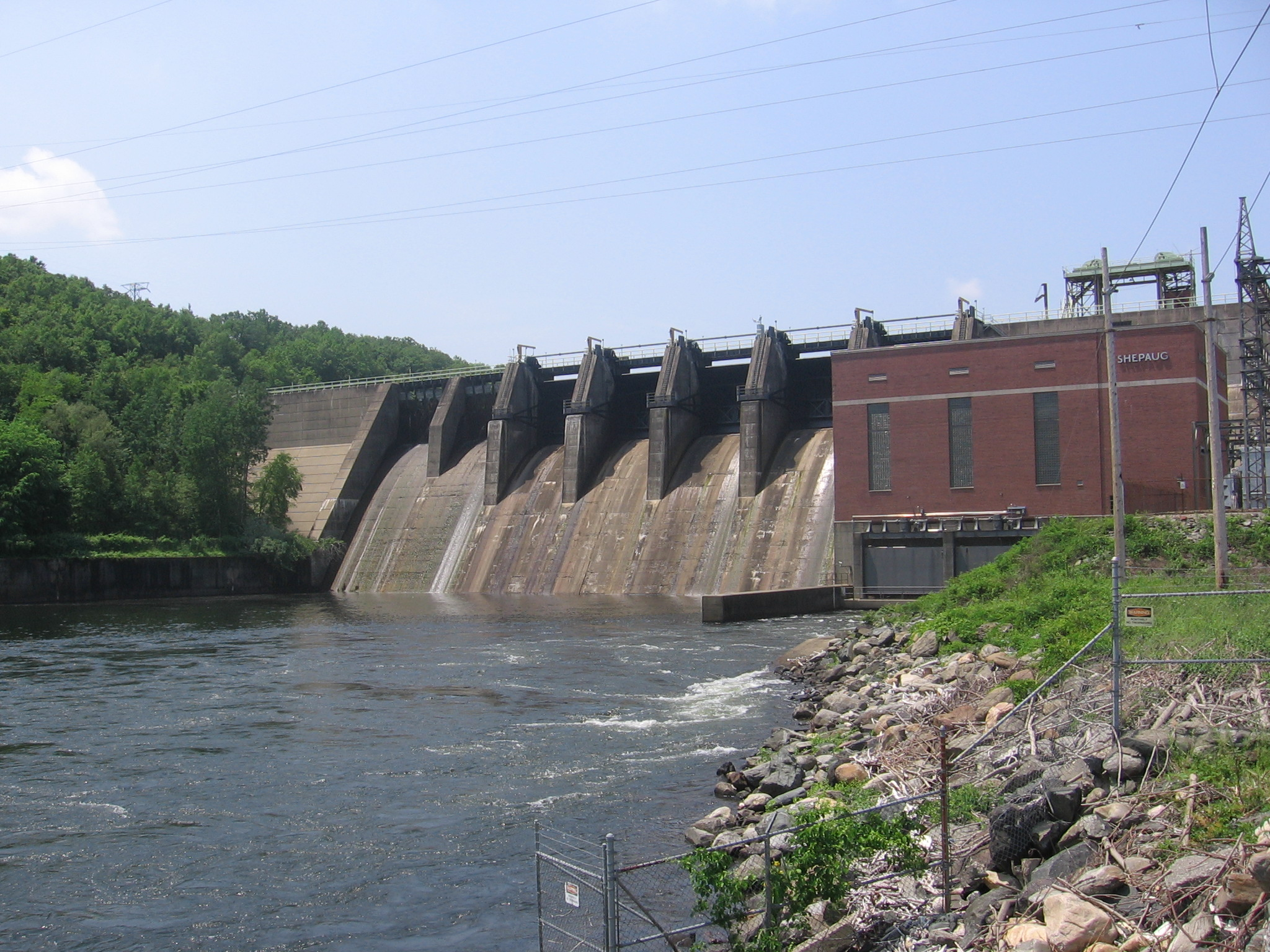
Shepaug Dam

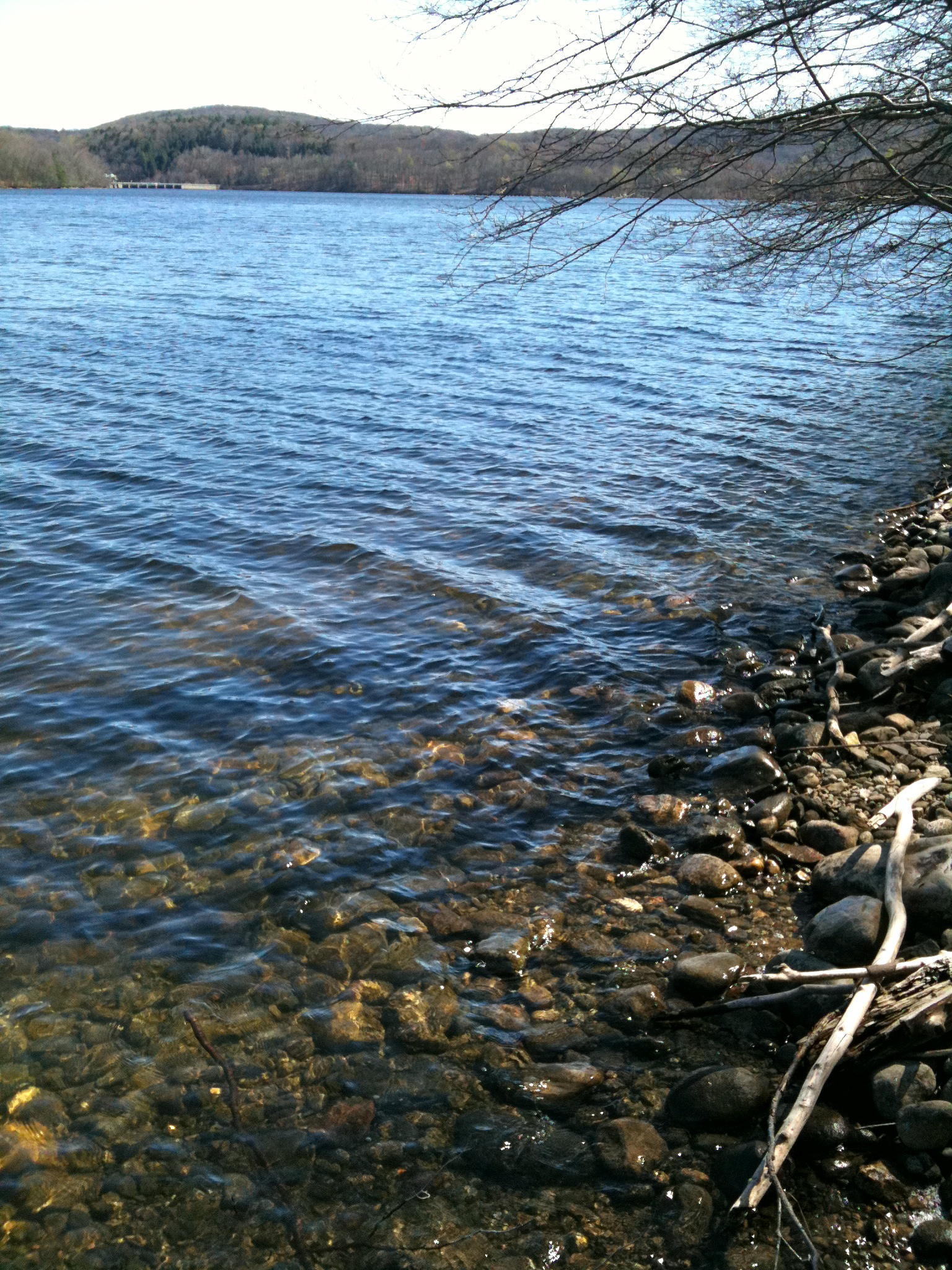
Lillinonah Trail

Shepaug Dam (National ID # CT00232) is a dam located between Newtown in Fairfield County and Southbury in New Haven County, Connecticut.

The concrete dam was constructed in 1955 by the Connecticut Light and Power Company, with a height of 140 feet, and a length at its crest of 1412 feet. It impounds the Housatonic River and the Shepaug River for hydroelectric power. The dam is owned and operated by FirstLight Power Resources.

The reservoir it creates, Lake Lillinonah, is the second-largest lake in the state, second only to Candlewood Lake. It has a water surface of 2.9 square miles, and a maximum capacity of 86,100 acre-feet. The riparian reservoir is the site of multiple state parks and recreation areas along its shorelines.

The dam, capable of a peak power output of 42,600 kW, is a popular nesting and feeding ground for wintering eagles and hawks, including the bald eagle. Near the power station, the operator also maintains an eagle observation area first opened by the utility's predecessor, Northeast Utilities, in the mid-1980s. Access is free, and some telescopes are provided. Utility company employees and volunteers from the Connecticut Audubon Society and other groups are at the observation area to assist visitors. Eagles are attracted to the spot because the water churning through the dam's hydroelectric turbine keeps the surface from icing over, allowing the birds to fish. Red-tailed hawks, goshawks, great blue herons and other waterfowl are also attracted to the spot.

FirstLight Power Resources has submitted a plan to the Connecticut Department of Public Utility Control to build a new peak-power plant next to the existing hydroelectric facility.

The dam is not to be confused with the 1965 earthen Upper Shepaug Reservoir Dam, owned and operated by the city of Waterbury, Connecticut in Litchfield County.
