= Kangerlussuaq Icefjord =

Fjord in Greenland

- Giesecke Icefjord
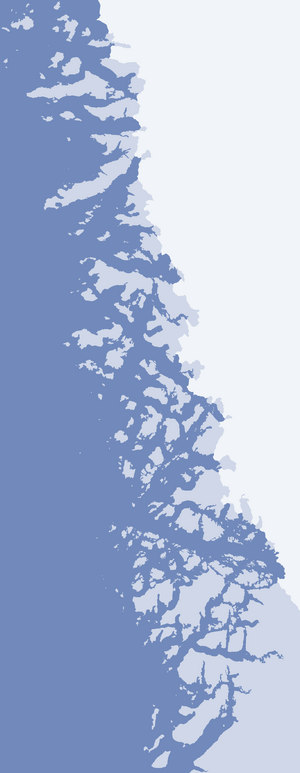
- Kangerlussuaq Icefjord (Upernavik Archipelago)
- Location: Upernavik Archipelago
- Coordinates: 73°33′N 55°48′W
- Ocean/sea sources: Baffin Bay
- Basin countries: Greenland
- Max. length: 42 km (26 mi)

Kangerlussuaq Icefjord (old spelling: Kangerdlugssuaq, Danish: Giesecke Isfjord) is a fjord in Avannaata municipality in northwestern Greenland.

== Geography ==
The 42 km (26 mi) long fjord flows to the northwest between the mainland of Greenland in the northeast, and a chain of islands in the southwest: Aukarnersuaq Island, Anarusuk Island, Nuuluk Island, Qallunaat Island, and Tuttorqortooq Island.

The fjord head is located at 73°30′N 55°28′W, where the southern tongue of Giesecke Glacier, named (Greenlandic: Kakiffait Sermiat), reaches the fjord. The fjord mouth is located in the northernmost part of Tasiusaq Bay, between Tuttorqortooq Island in the southwest and Mernoq Island in the north.

=== Qaaneq Fjord ===
The innermost portion of the fjord bears a different name: Qaaneq (old spelling: Qâneq). It is an inner extension of Kangerlussuaq Icefjord, with the flow from one to the other disrupted by the Kakiffait Sermiat glacier tongue. If the length of both fjords were to be combined, the total length of Kangerlussuaq Icefjord would reach 64 km (40 mi). The head of Qaaneq Fjord is located at 73°21′30″N 55°02′22″W, situated between two nunataks on the mainland of Greenland, bounding it from the north and from the southwest.

== See also ==
- List of fjords of Greenland
