= Paagussat Island =

Island in Avannaata, Greenland

Paagussat
- Location within Greenland

Geography
- Location: Greenland
- Coordinates: 73°21′10″N 56°12′30″W
- Archipelago: Upernavik Archipelago

Administration
- Greenland
- Municipality: Avannaata

Paagussat Island (old spelling: Pâgússat) is an uninhabited island in Avannaata municipality in northwestern Greenland.

== Geography ==
Paagussat Island is located in the outer belt of islands in Tasiusaq Bay, in the central part of Upernavik Archipelago. Ikerasak Strait separates it from Uigorlersuaq Island in the north and from Tasiusaq Island in the east. The inner waterways of the bay separate it from Illunguit Island in the southwest. It is one of the low-lying islands buffering Tasiusaq Island from the west. The highest point on the island is an unnamed 200 m (660 ft) point in the center.
