= Tasiusaq Bay =

Bay in Avannaata, Greenland

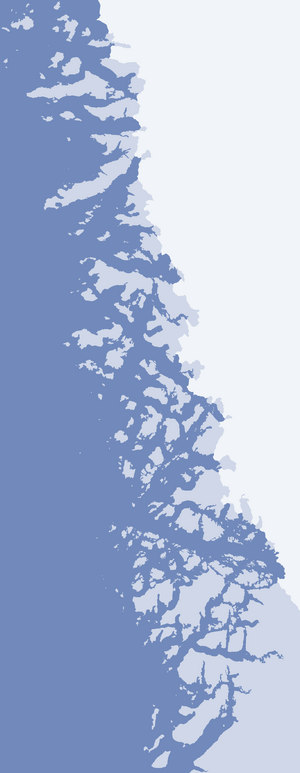
Tasiusaq Bay (Upernavik Archipelago)

Tasiusaq Bay (Danish: Vakkerprydsbugt) is a bay in the Upernavik Archipelago in the Avannaata municipality in northwestern Greenland. It is an indentation of northeastern Baffin Bay. The name of the bay derives from the name of the settlement of the same name in the bay.

== Geography ==
The bay is located in the north-central part of Upernavik Archipelago, between Sugar Loaf Bay in the north, and Upernavik Icefjord in the south. At its widest − from the Cape Shackleton promontory on Apparsuit Island in the north at 73°48′13″N 56°49′57″W, to the mouth of Upernavik Icefjord in the south − Tasiusaq Bay stretches for approximately 93 km (58 mi).

=== Islands ===
There is a large number of islands and skerries in the bay, scattered over the entire area. They can be divides into several groups:

==== Northern band ====
The northernmost group of islands lies between the Nasaussap Saqqaa fjord emptying into Sugar Loaf Bay in the north, and the Kangerlussuaq Icefjord in the south. The major islands, listed from north to south, are:

- Qullikorsuit Island
- Apparsuit Island
- Paornivik Island
- Mernoq Island

==== Central band ====
The central group of islands lies between the Kangerlussuaq Icefjord in the north, and the mouth of Upernavik Icefjord in the south. The major islands, listed from north to south, are:

- Tuttorqortooq Island
- Horse Head Island
- Qallunaat Island
- Mattaangassut Island
- Nutaarmiut Island
- Saattorsuaq Island
- Nuuluk Island
- Anarusuk Island
- Aappilattoq Island
- Uigorlersuaq Island
- Tasiusaq Island
- Aukarnersuaq Island
- Paagussat Island
- Qaqaarissorsuaq Island
- Illunnguit Island
- Kangaarsuk Island
- Ateqanngitsorsuaq Island
- Qaarsorsuatsiaq Island
- Innaarsuit Island
- Naajaat Island

==== Upernavik Icefjord islands ====
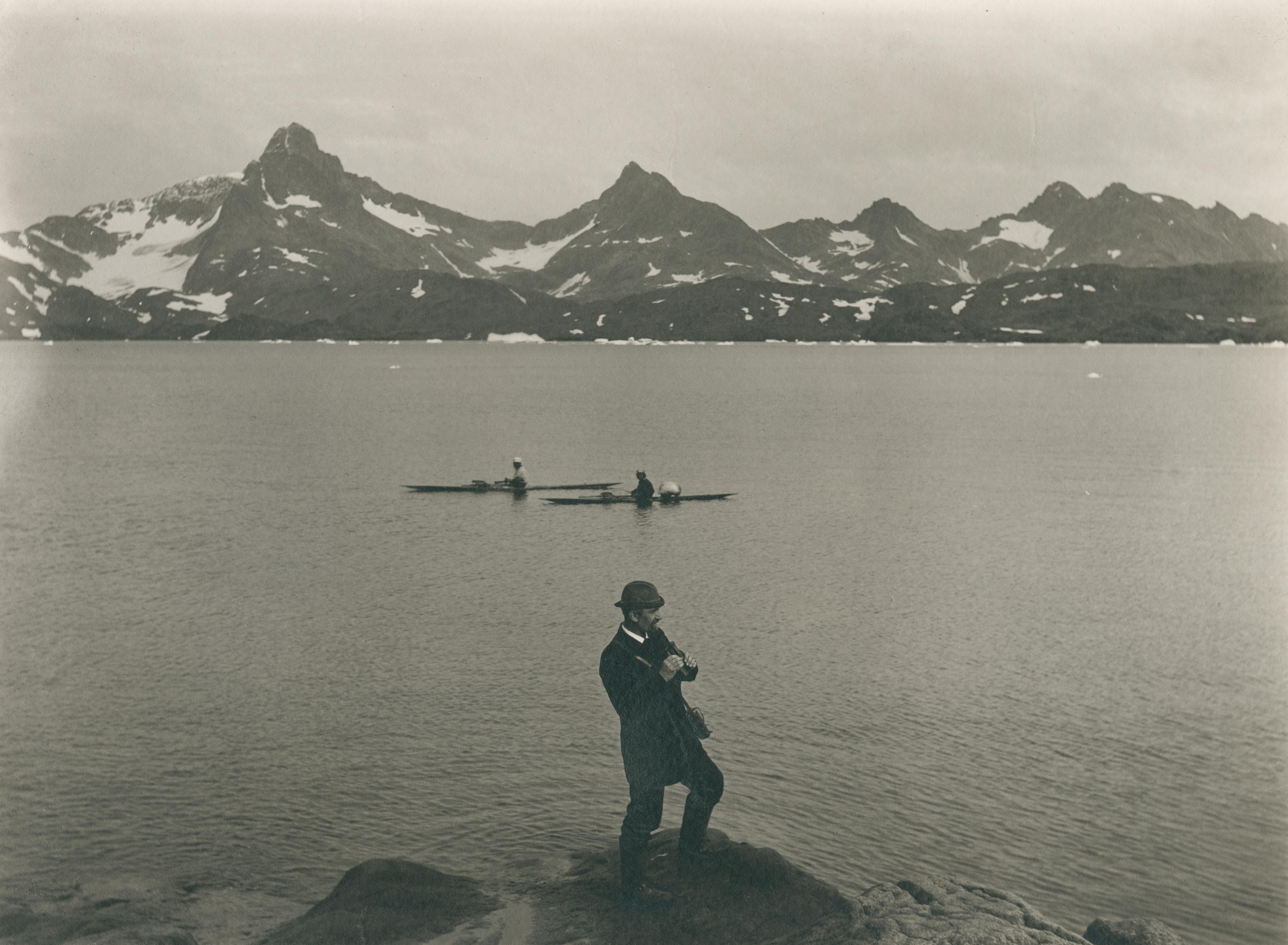
Tasiusaq Bay (c.1900)

The southern group of islands bounds the Upernavik Icefjord from the north. The major islands, listed from east to west, are:

- Maniitsoq
- Puugutaa
- Qaneq
- Sisuarissut
- Tussaaq

=== Glaciers and nunataks ===
The coastline of mainland Greenland in the region is a series of alternating nunataks and glaciers draining the Greenland ice sheet (Greenlandic: Sermersuaq). the major features, from north to south, are:

- Giesecke Glacier with its two tongues: Qeqertarsuup Sermia and Kakiffait Sermiat
- Nunatarsuaq nunatak
- Alanngorsuup Sermia glacier
- Qassersuaq Peninsula
- Upernavik Glacier

=== Waterways ===
The major waterways of Tasiusaq Bay are the Nasaussap Saqqaa fjord in the north, Kangerlussuaq Icefjord, and Upernavik Icefjord in the south.

== Settlement ==
The mainland is uninhabited, and only some of the islands are settled. Tasiusaq is the largest settlement in the bay. Other settlements are Nutaarmiut, Innaarsuit, and Naajaat. The former settlement of Tussaaq has one inhabitant left.
