= Lake Lillinonah =

Lake in Western Connecticut, United States

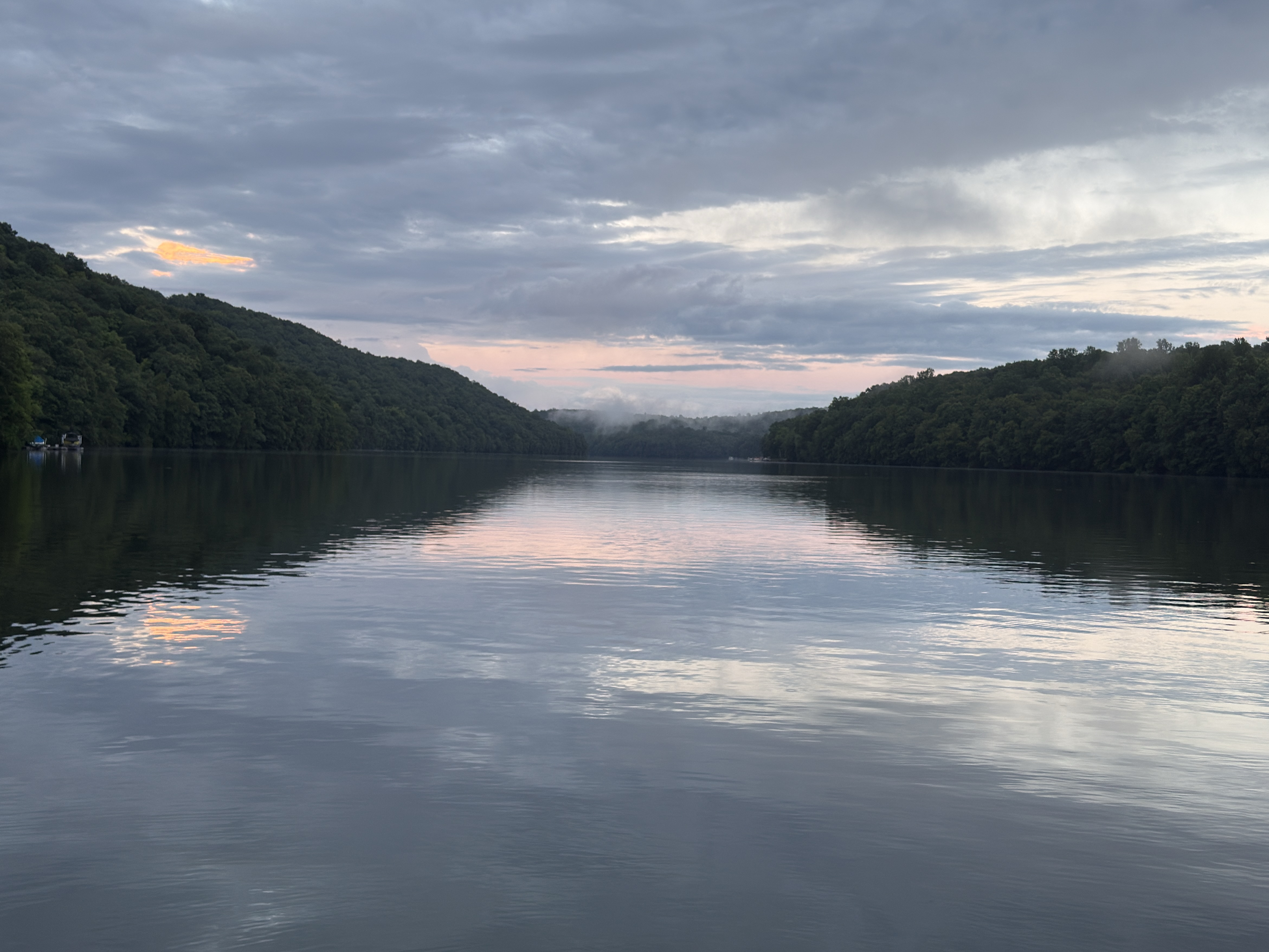
- Lake Lillinonah near the Bridgewater Boat Launch

- Location within Connecticut Location within the United States
- Location: Fairfield, Litchfield and New Haven counties, Connecticut
- Coordinates: 41°28′08″N 73°18′43″W
- Type: Reservoir
- Managing agency: Lake Lillinonah Authority, CL&P
- First flooded: September 27, 1955
- Max. length: 12 to 14 mi (19 to 23 km)
- Surface area: 1,547 to 1,900 acres (626 to 769 ha)
- Max. depth: 110 ft (34 m)
- Shore length^{1}: 45 mi (72 km)
- Surface elevation: 59 m (194 ft)
- ^{1} Shore length is not a well-defined measure.

Interactive map of Lake Lillinonah

Lake Lillinonah /ˌlɪlɪˈnoʊnə/ is a manmade lake located in Fairfield, Litchfield and New Haven counties of Western Connecticut, approximately 60 miles (97 km) northeast of New York City. It is the second largest lake in Connecticut, smaller only than Candlewood Lake. The lake is bordered by six towns: Brookfield, Bridgewater, Newtown, New Milford, Roxbury, and Southbury. It was formed in 1955 by impoundment of the Housatonic River and the Shepaug River by the Shepaug Dam which was built by the Connecticut Light and Power Company. Some of the most expensive real estate in the Greater Danbury area is located on the shores of the lake, in the towns of Brookfield, Bridgewater and Newtown.

== Governance ==
Logo of the Lake Lillinonah Authority

The Lake Lillinonah Authority is a governing body responsible for overseeing the lake's management and conservation. Established to address environmental concerns and enforce boater safety rules, the authority collaborates with local governments to maintain the lake's ecological balance and enhance public access.
