= Giesecke Glacier =

Glacier in Greenland

Giececke Glacier
- Interactive map of Giececke Glacier
- Location: Upernavik Archipelago, Greenland
- Coordinates: 73°35′N 55°12′W
- Terminus: Kangerlussuaq Icefjord

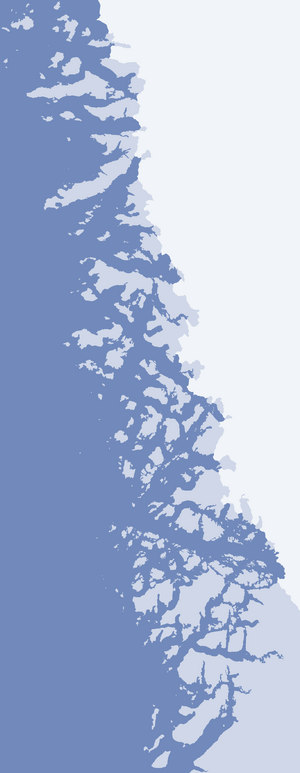
Giececke Glacier (Upernavik Archipelago)

Giesecke Glacier (Danish: Giesecke brær) is a glacier in Avannaata municipality in northwestern Greenland. Its outflow is split in the center by a nunatak. Through two tongues it drains the Greenland ice sheet westwards into Kangerlussuaq Icefjord. The northern tongue (Greenlandic: Qeqertarsuup Sermia) reaches the fjord at 73°35′N 55°36′W. The southern tongue (Greenlandic: Kakiffait Sermiat) reaches the fjord at 73°30′N 55°28′W.
