= Nutaarmiut =

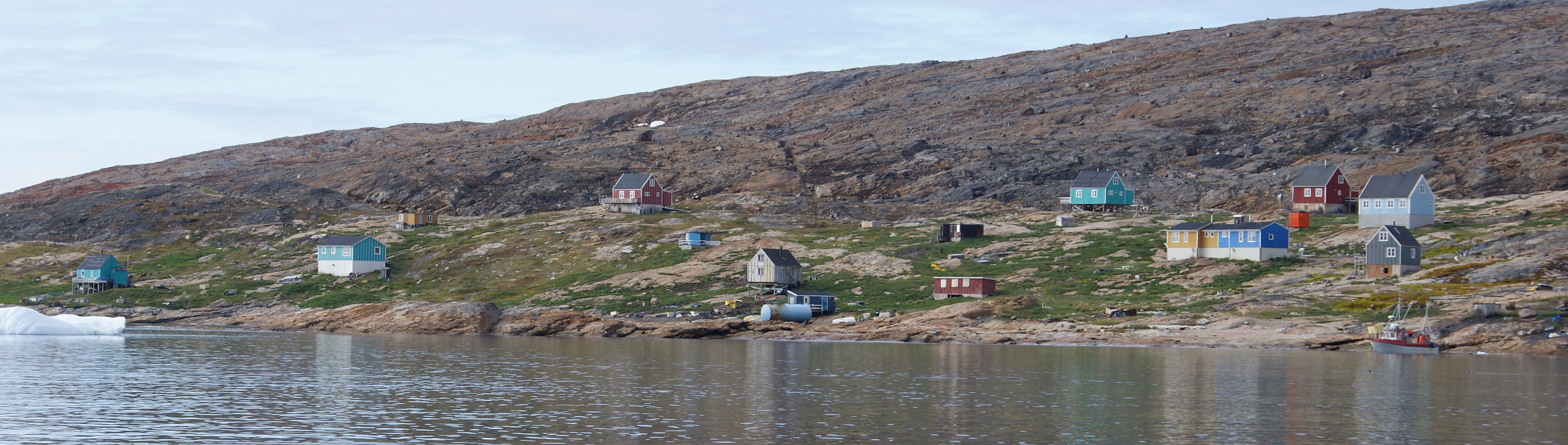
- Nutaarmiut

- Location within Greenland
- Coordinates: 73°31′8″N 56°25′35″W
- State: Kingdom of Denmark
- Constituent country: Greenland
- Municipality: Avannaata

Population (2025)
  - Total: 36
- Time zone: UTC−02:00 (Western Greenland Time)
  - Summer (DST): UTC−01:00 (Western Greenland Summer Time)
- Postal code: 3962 Upernavik

Nutaarmiut (old spelling: Nutârmiut) is an island settlement in Avannaata municipality, in northwestern Greenland. It had 43 inhabitants in 2020.

== Upernavik Archipelago ==
Nutaarmiut within the Upernavik Archipelago

Nutaarmiut is located within Upernavik Archipelago, a vast archipelago of islands on the coast of northeastern Baffin Bay. Nutaarmiut Island has an area of 1.51 km^{2}.

== Infrastructure ==
The village is equipped with a school and a small church. Nutaarmiut Atuarfia, the local school, can accommodate students ranging from 1st to 7th grade.

== Population ==
The population of Nutaarmiut has decreased by over a 40 percent relative to the 1990 levels, and has been steadily decreasing in the 2000s. The main sources of income are fishing and seal hunting.

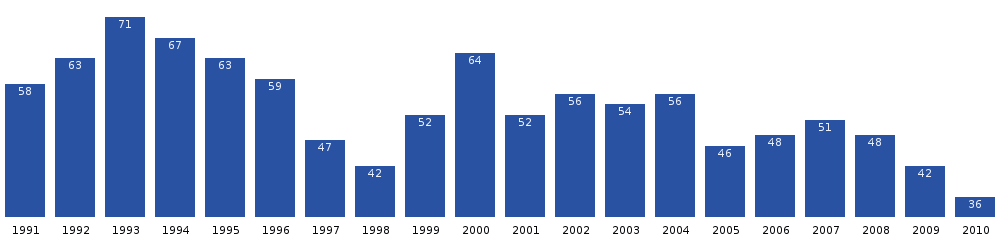
Nutaarmiut population growth dynamics in the last two decades. Source: Statistics Greenland
