= Ikerasak (disambiguation) =

Ikerasak may refer to the following locations in Greenland:

- Ikerasak, a settlement on Ikerasak Island in the Uummannaq Fjord region in northwestern Greenland
- Ikerasak Island, an island in the Uummannaq Fjord region in northwestern Greenland
- Ikerasak Fjord, a tributary fjord of Uummannaq Fjord in northwestern Greenland
- Ikerasak Strait, a strait in Upernavik Archipelago in northwestern Greenland
