= Salliaruseq Island =

Island in Greenland

Salliaruseq
- Location of Salliaruseq Island
- Interactive map of Salliaruseq

Geography
- Location: Uummannaq Fjord
- Coordinates: 70°41′30″N 51°50′00″W
- Area: 130 km^{2} (50 sq mi)
- Length: 20.5 km (12.74 mi)
- Width: 9.6 km (5.97 mi)
- Coastline: 53.5 km (33.24 mi)
- Highest elevation: 1,418 m (4652 ft)
- Highest point: Inussugtalik

Administration
- Greenland
- Municipality: Avannaata

Salliaruseq Island (old spelling: Sagdliaruseq, Danish: Storøen, translated: The-big-island) is an uninhabited island in Avannaata municipality in northwestern Greenland. At 130 km^{2} (50.2 mi^{2}), it is one of the larger islands in the Uummannaq Fjord system, located in its central part due east of Uummannaq Island.

Air Greenland helicopters approach Uummannaq Heliport on the way from Qaarsut Airport alongside the western wall of Salliaruseq, first converging to the island, to then turn 90 degrees to the west due to winds in the Assorput Strait.

== Geography ==
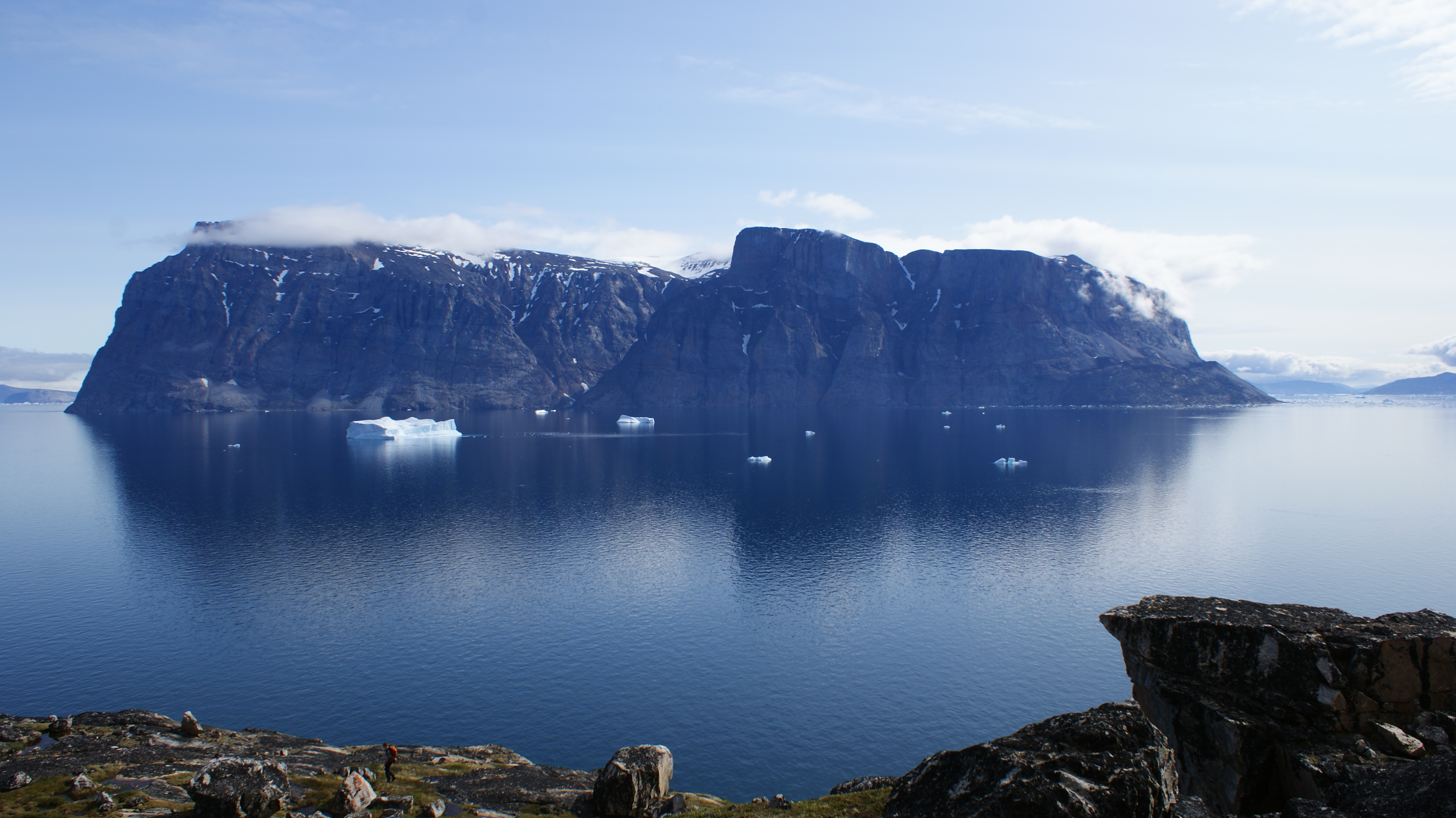
Western wall seen from the Nuussuatsiaq promontory at the base of the eastern wall of Uummannaq mountain

Salliaruseq is separated from the Uummannaq Island in the west by the Assorput Strait; from Appat Island and Saattut archipelago in the north by the central arm of Uummannaq Fjord; from the Qaqullussuit Peninsula jutting off the mainland in the east by Alaanguarqap Suullua strait; from the Ikerasak and Talerua islands in the southeast by the southern arm of the central Uummannaq Fjord, and from the Nuussuaq Peninsula in the south by the Sarqarput Strait.

It is very mountainous, with precipitous walls falling from the summit plateau (Qollortoq) to the south (Ujarassuaq), west (Innarsuaq), and north (Alaanguaraq). The highest point on the island is Inussugtalik (1,418 m (4,652.2 ft)) above the northern wall. The next highest point in the vicinity of the island is the Uummannaq Mountain on the western side of the Assorput Strait.

== Promontories ==
Name	Direction	Latitude N	Longitude W
Qillorfik	Western Cape	70°40′22″	51°56′04″
Qingaarsuaq	Northwestern Cape	70°43′42″	51°55′20″
Pamiallua	Eastern Cape	70°39′44″	51°25′10″
Ujarassuaq	Southern Cape	70°39′05″	51°49′55″

== Photographs ==
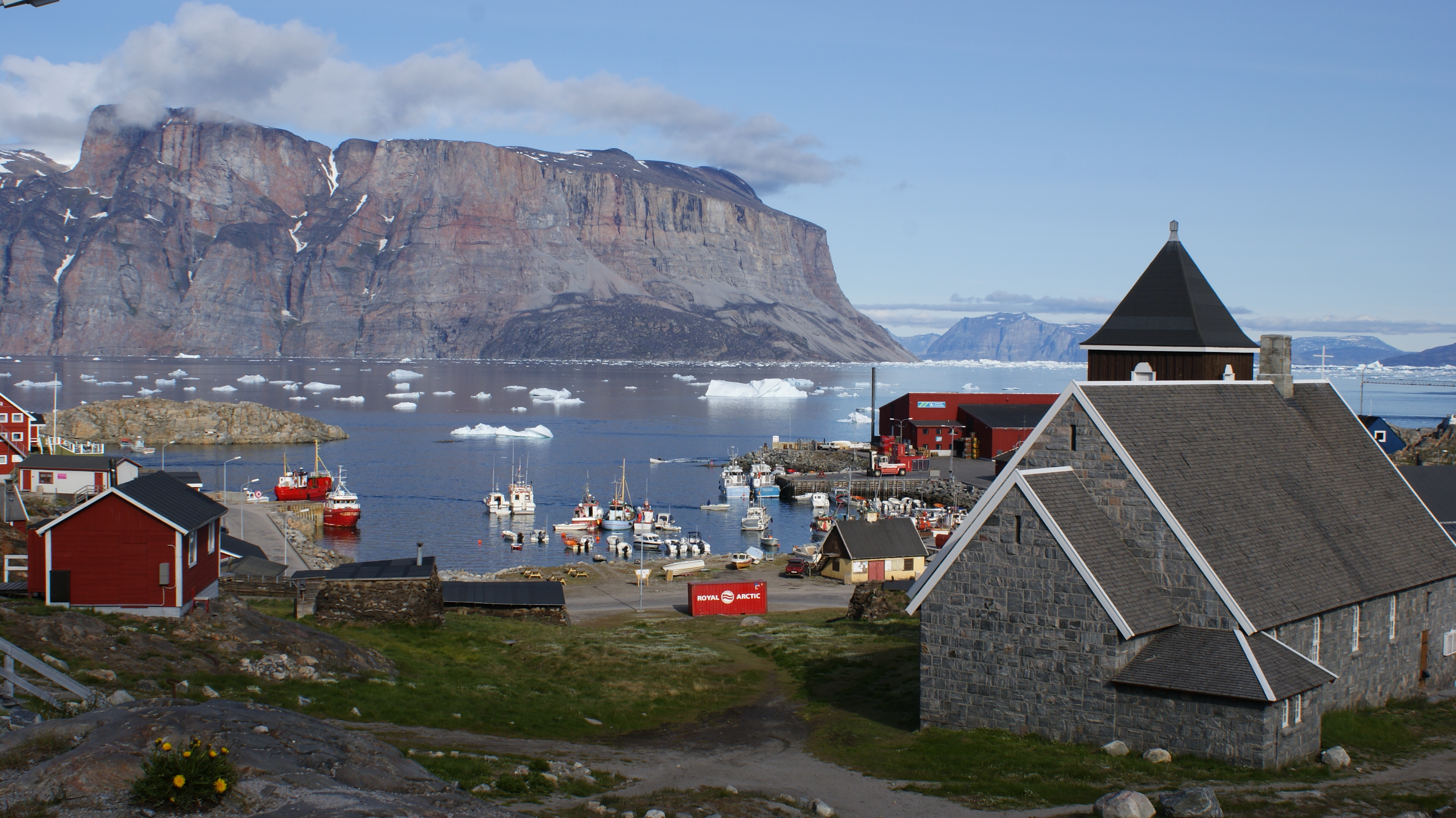
Salliaruseq, a landmark of Uummannaq

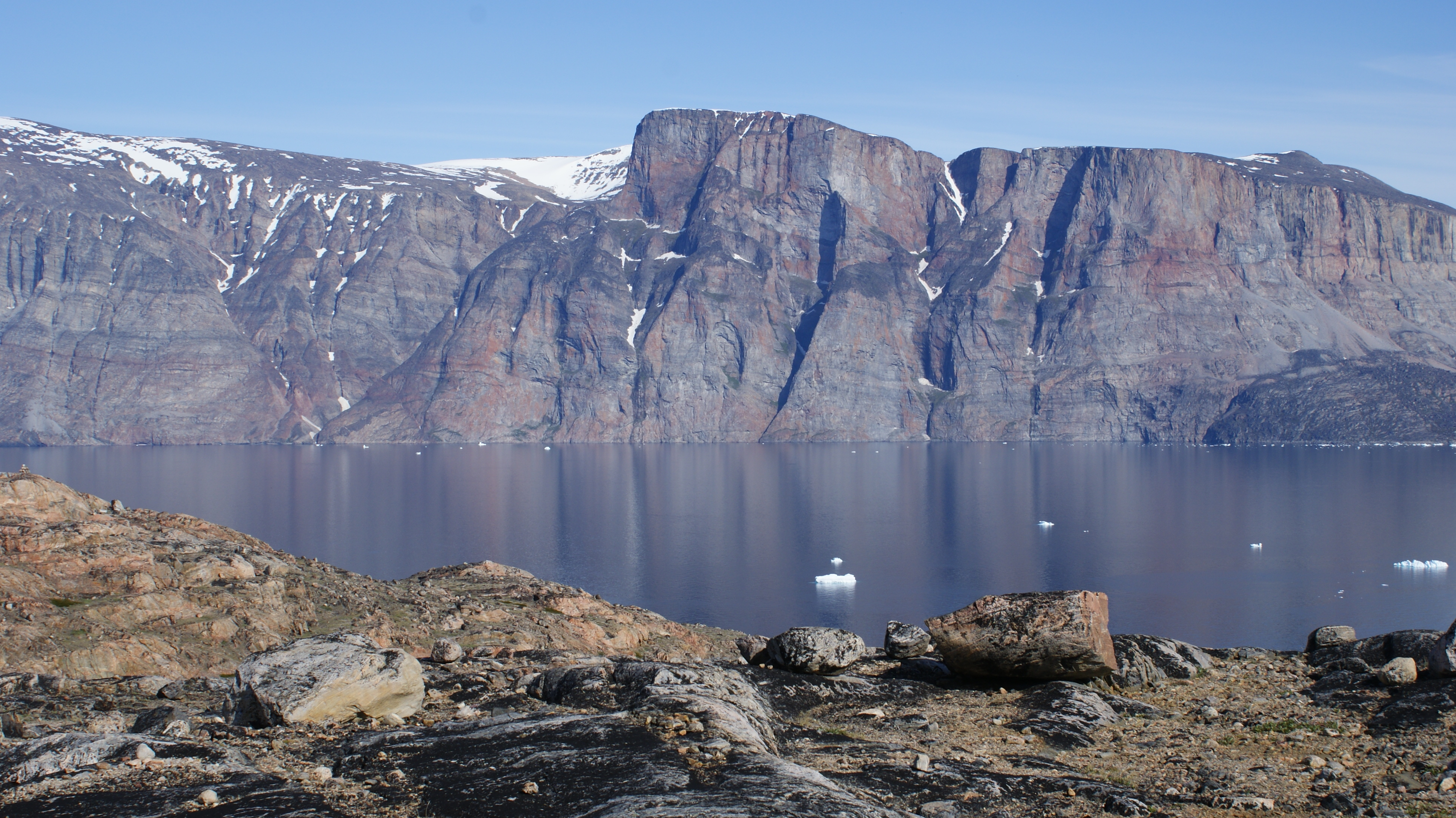
Salliaruseq

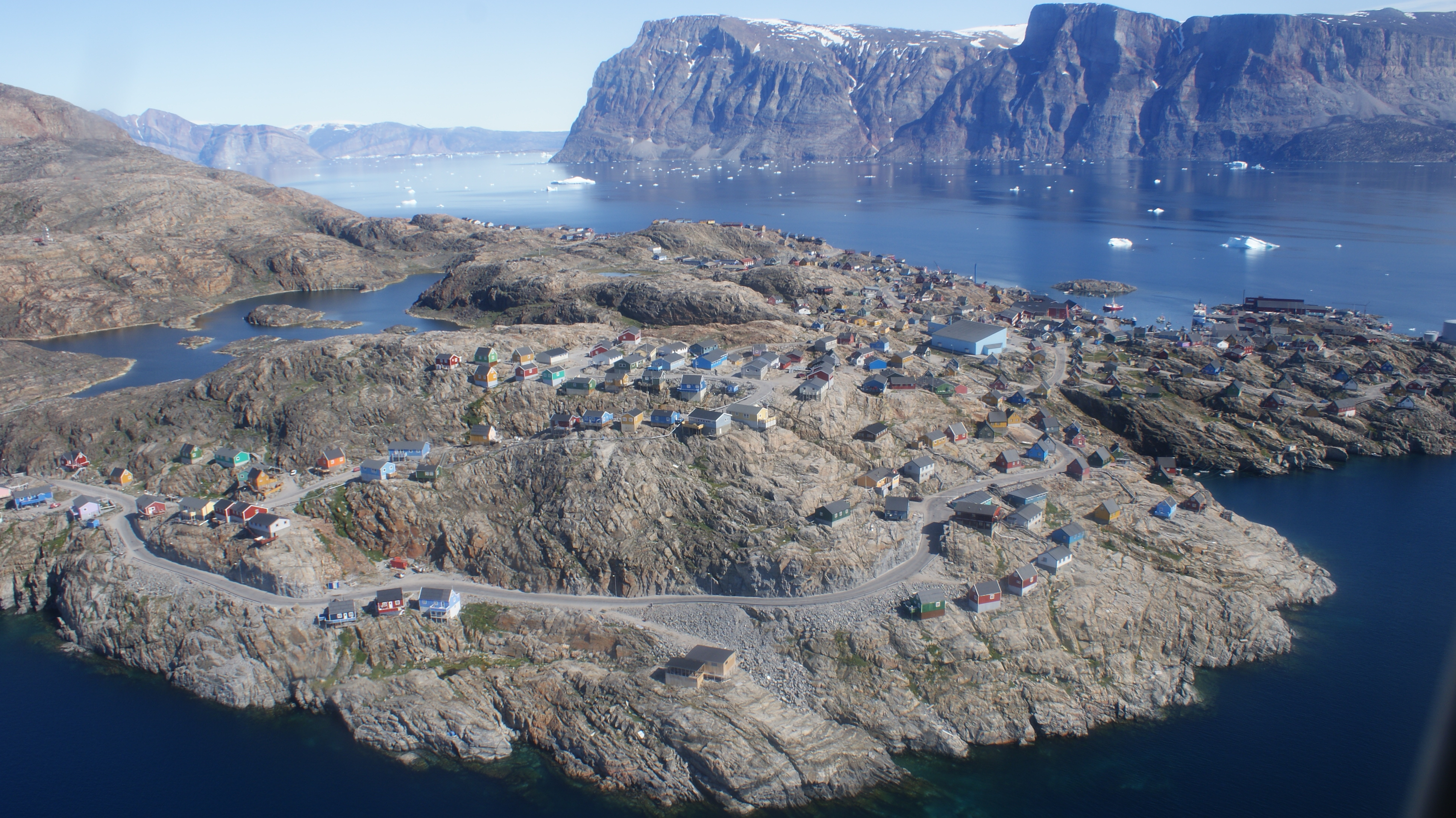
Aerial view of Salliaruseq Island and Uummannaq, photographed from Air Greenland Bell 212 helicopter during Uummannaq-Qaarsut flight

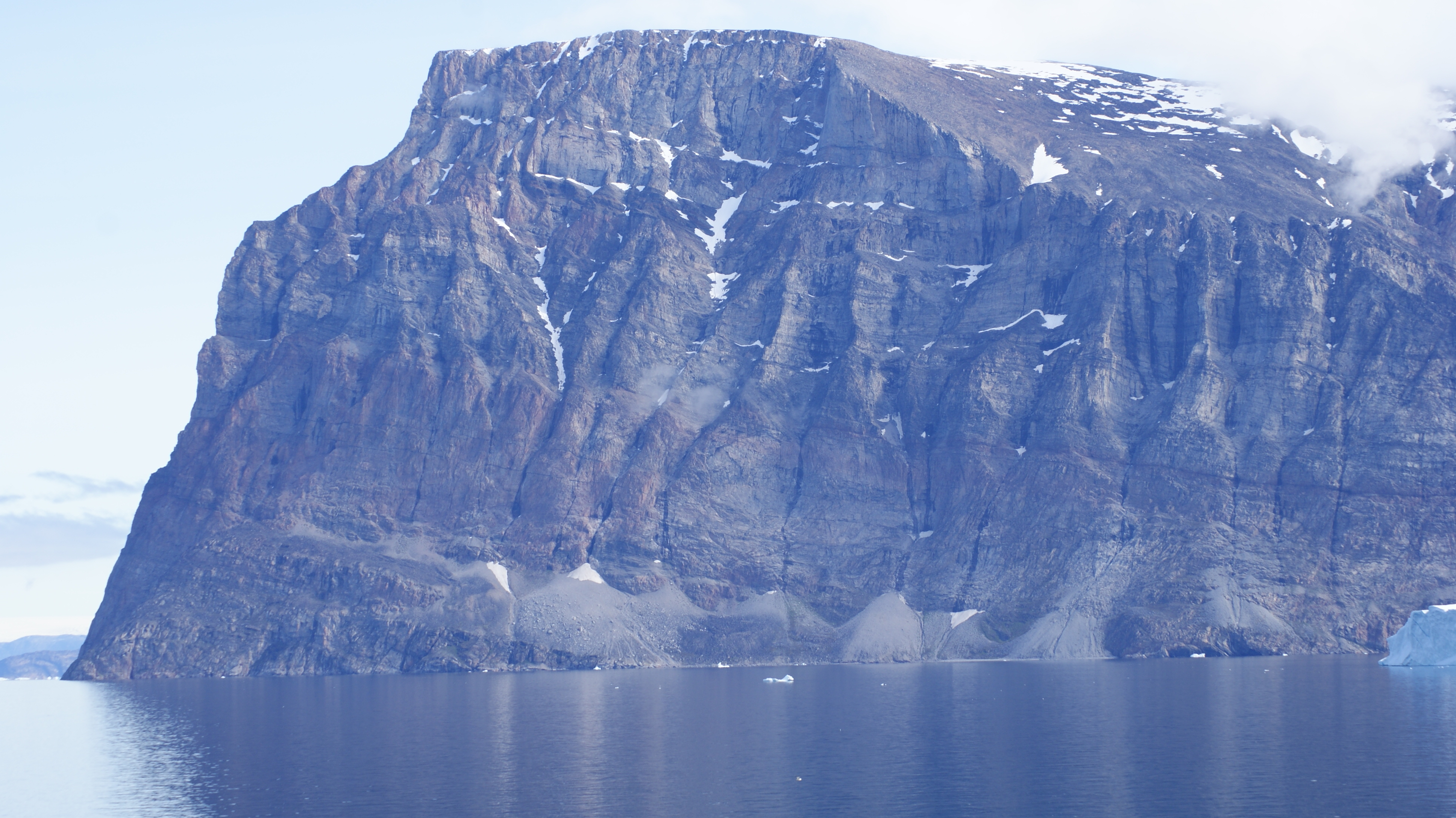
Qingaarsuaq, the northwestern cape and pillar, a breeding site for thousands of fulmars
