= Sarqarput Strait =

Strait in Greenland

Coordinates: 70°40′N 52°15′W

Location of Sarqarput Strait within the Uummannaq Fjord region

Sarqarput Strait is a strait in the Uummannaq Fjord system in northwestern Greenland. It separates Uummannaq Island in the northeast from Nuussuaq Peninsula in the southwest. The strait waterway is part of the southern arm of Uummannaq Fjord, narrowing into Ikerasak Fjord in the southeast, at the base of Nuussuaq Peninsula. The Sarfaagfip Kussinnersua and Kuuk rivers flowing from the peninsular glaciers empty into the strait.

== Settlement ==
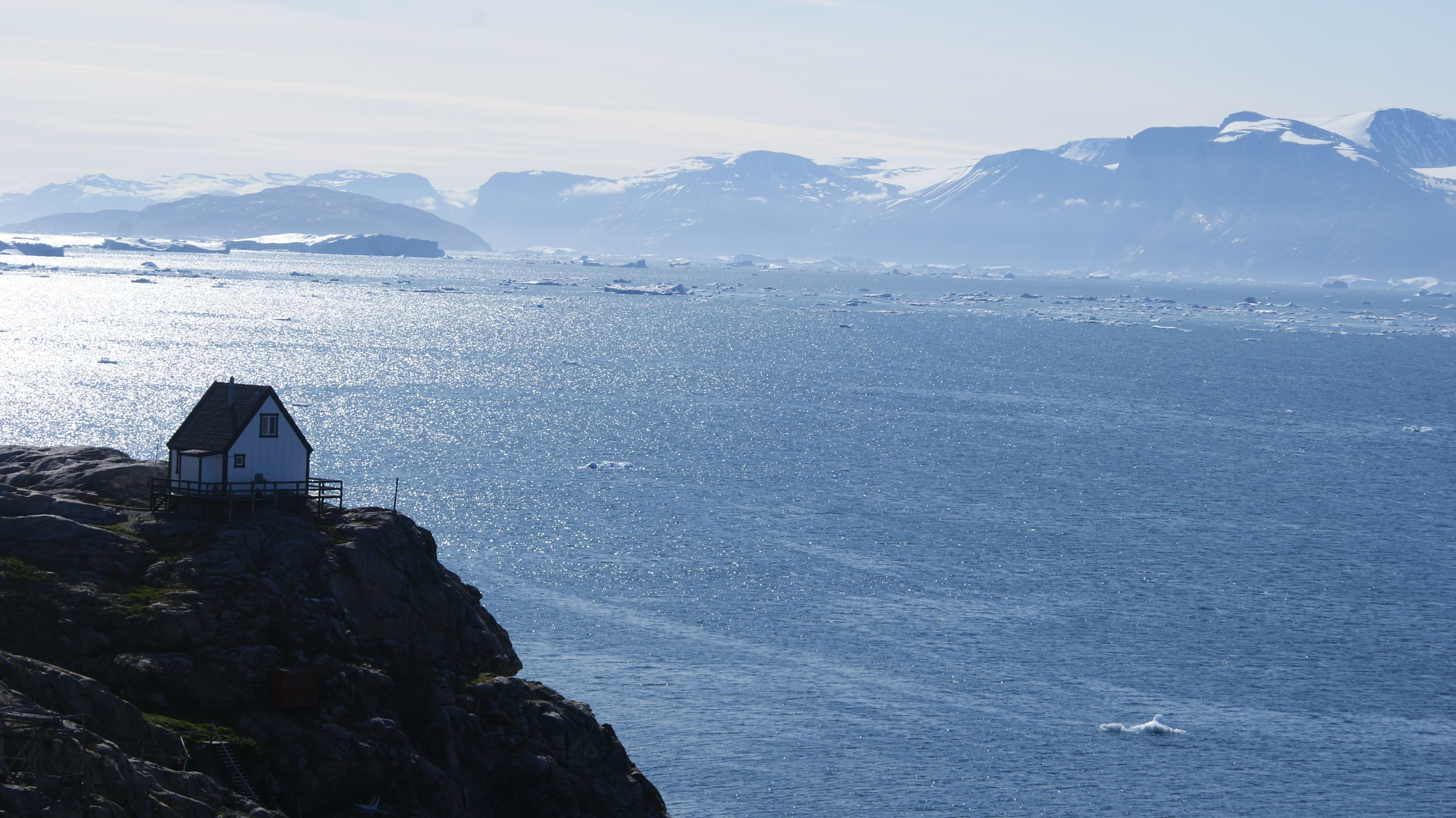
Nuussuaq Peninsula seen from Uummannaq across Sarqarput Strait

There are two settlements on the shores of the strait. Uummannaq on Uummannaq Island in the northeast is the major cultural center of northwestern Greenland. Qaarsut is a small village on Nuussuaq Peninsula, host to Qaarsut Airport, the only airport in the region.

== Transport ==
On the way from Qaarsut Airport, the helicopters of Air Greenland approach the Uummannaq Heliport−located on the western shore of the strait−alongside the western wall of Salliaruseq, first converging to the island, to then turn 90 degrees to the west due to winds in the Assorput Strait, which connects to Sarqarput Strait from the north.

== Photographs ==
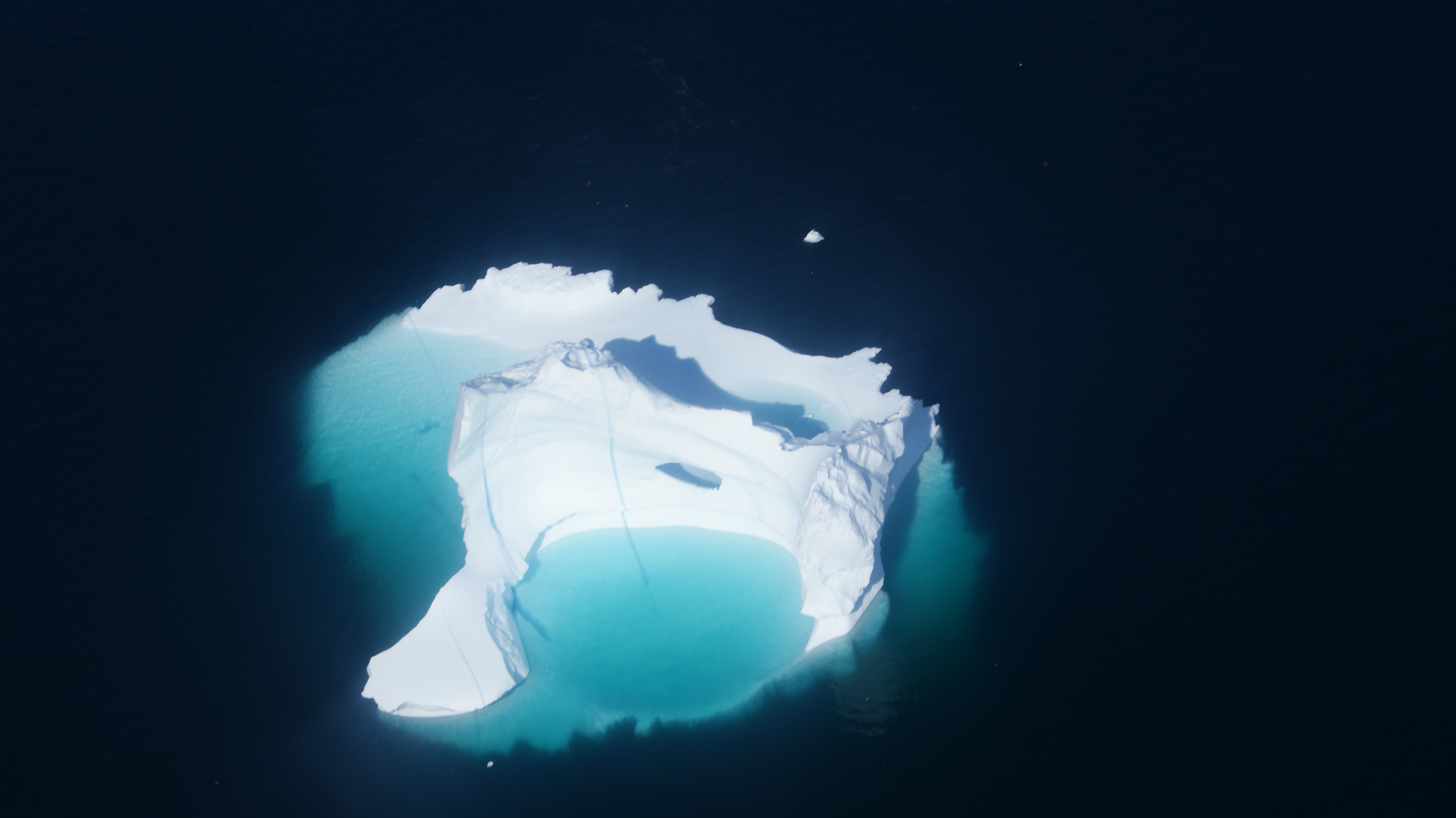
Aerial view of an iceberg floating in Sarqarput Strait

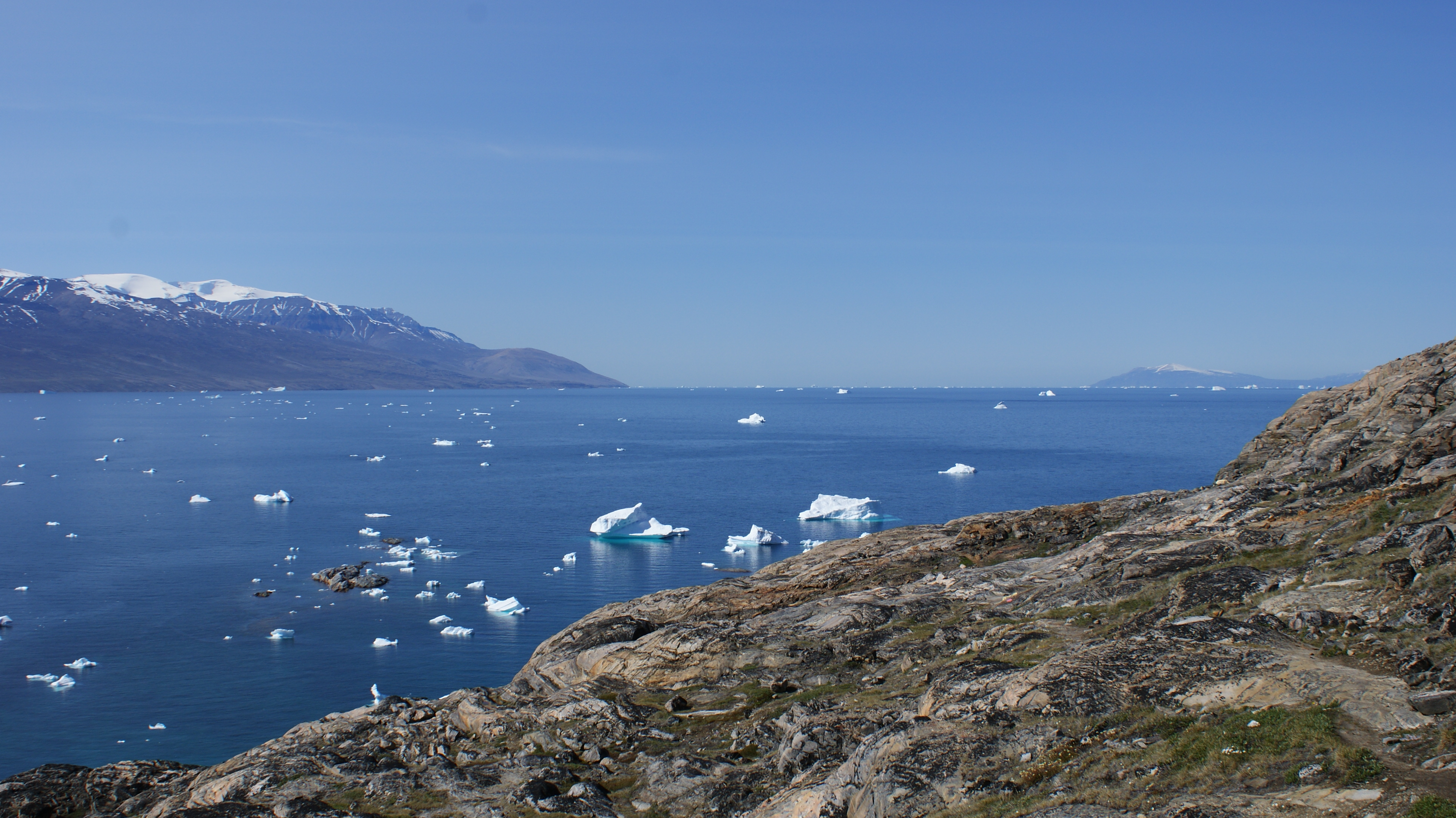
Qasigissat Bay on the coast of Uummannaq Island opens into Sarqarput Strait

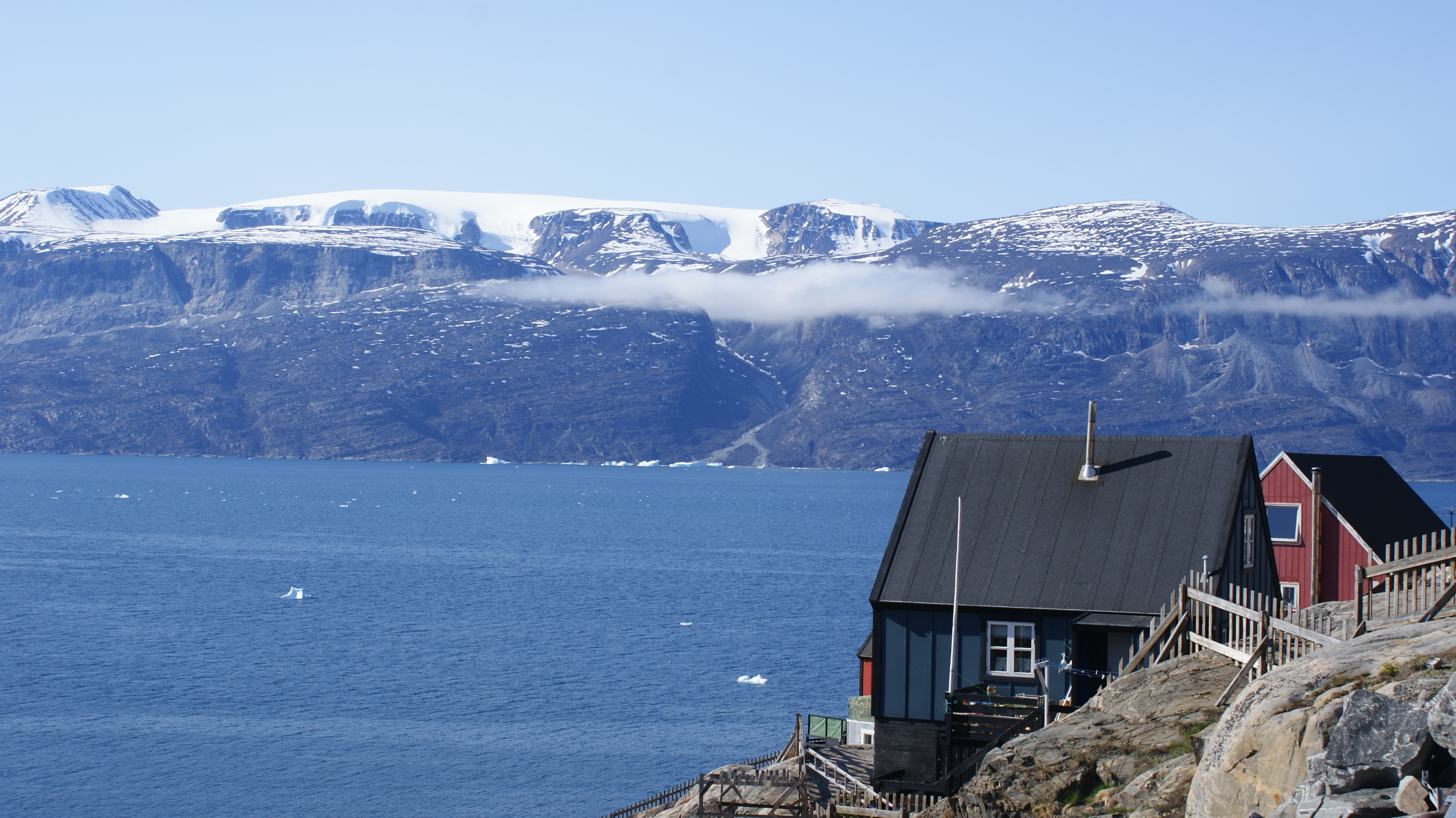
Nuussuaq Peninsula seen from Uummannaq across Sarqarput Strait

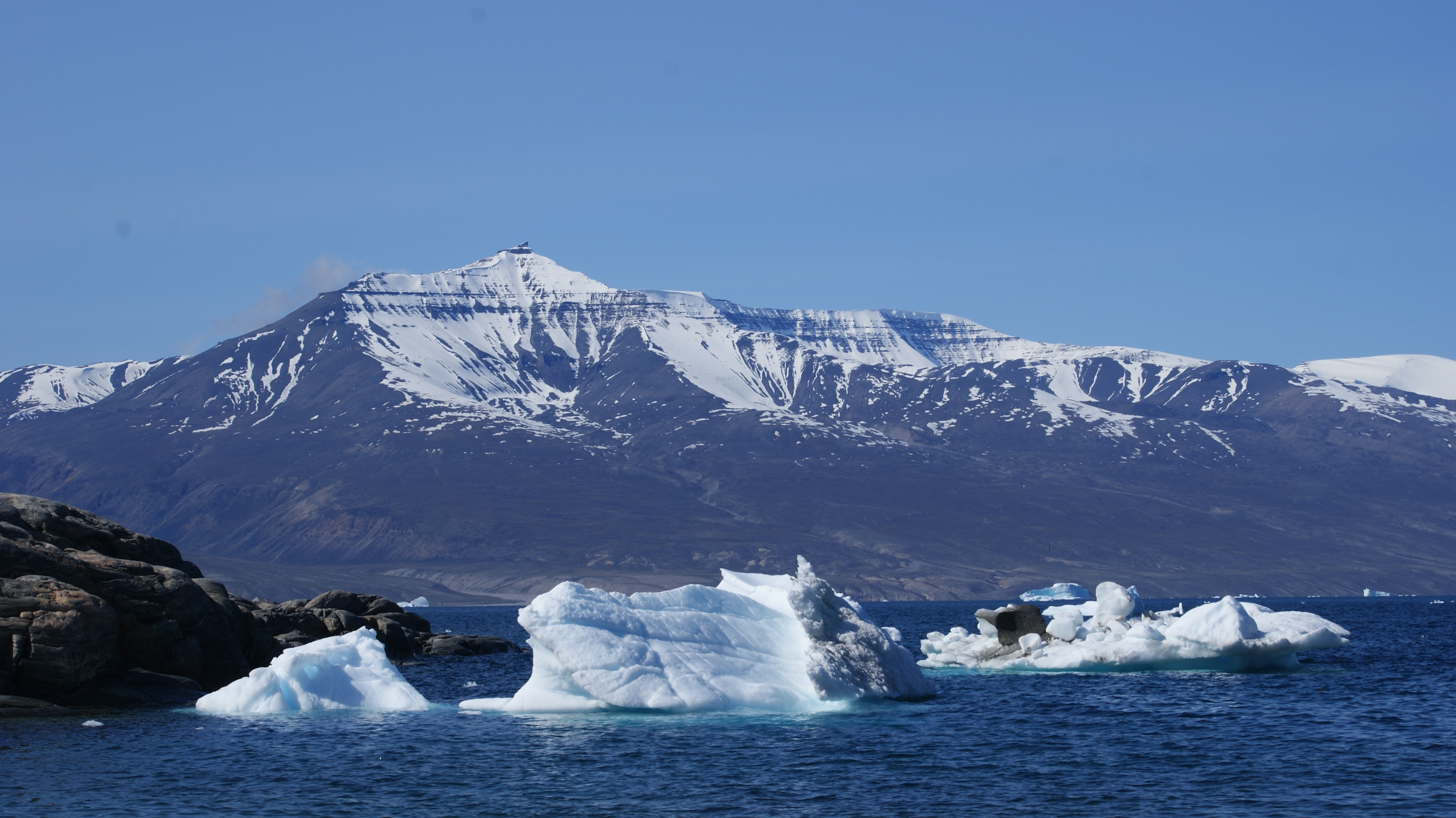
Qilertinnguit Kangilequtaa mountain on Nuussuaq Peninsula seen across Sarqarput Strait
