= Talerua Island =

Island in Greenland

Talerua
- Interactive map of Talerua

Geography
- Location: Uummannaq Fjord
- Coordinates: 70°31′30″N 51°37′30″W

Administration
- Greenland
- Municipality: Avannaata

Talerua Island is an uninhabited island in Avannaata municipality in northwestern Greenland, located in the southeastern part of Uummannaq Fjord, at the mouth of Ikerasak Fjord, its innermost section.

== Geography ==
The island has an elongated oval shape of southeast-to-northwest orientation. To the north, it is separated from a larger Ikerasak Island by the Ikarasanguaq strait, and further from Drygalski Peninsula on the mainland by the narrow Ikerasassuaq strait. To the south, the southern arm of Uummannaq Fjord separates it from the Nuussuaq Peninsula. To the northwest, the central arm of Uummannaq Fjord separates it from Salliaruseq Island.
