= Qaarsut Airport =

Airport in Avannaata, Greenland

Qaarsut Airport Mittarfik Qaarsut
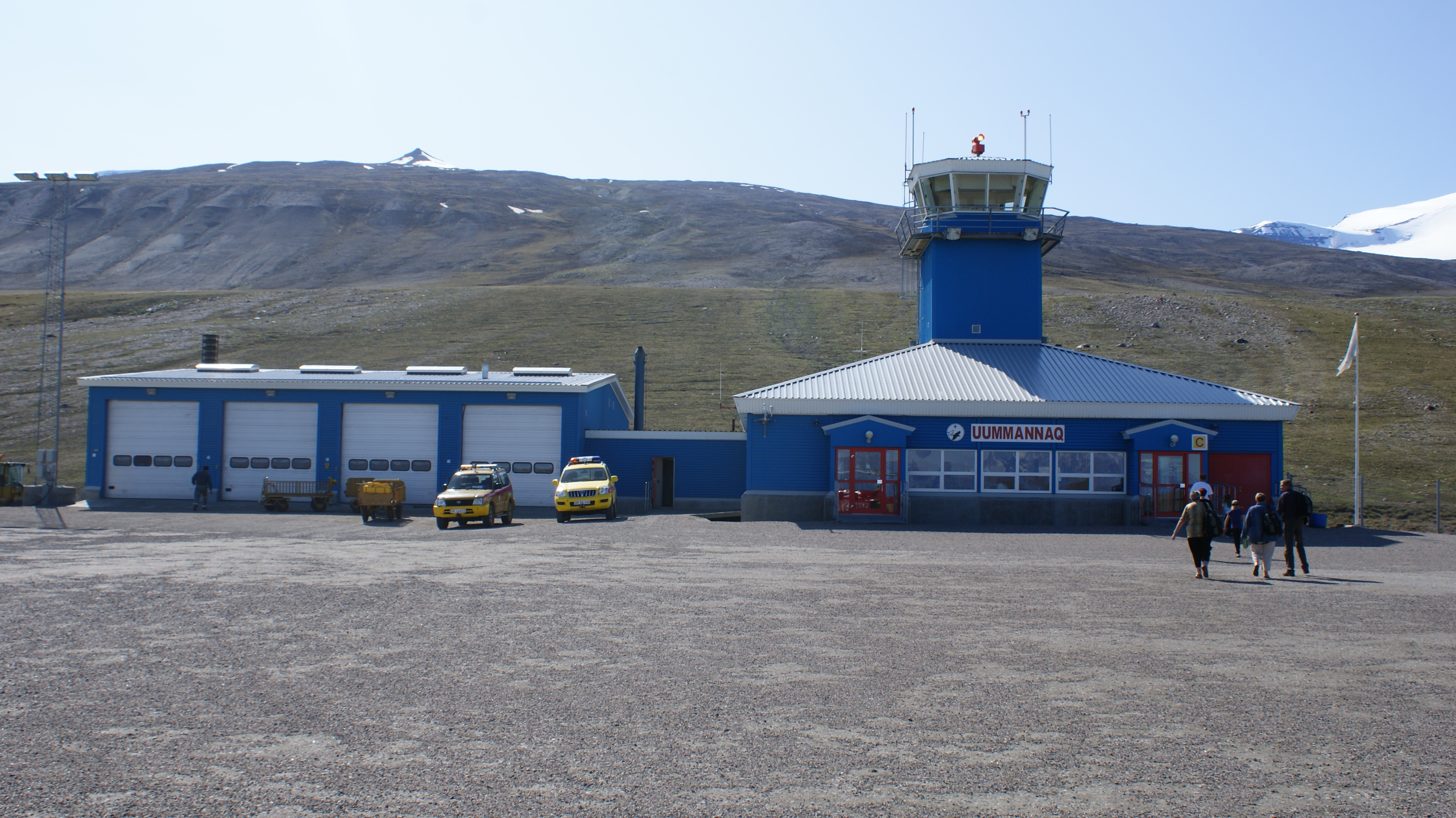
- IATA: JQA; ICAO: BGUQ

Summary
- Airport type: Public
- Operator: Greenland Airport Authority (Mittarfeqarfiit)
- Serves: Qaarsut and Uummannaq, Greenland
- Location: Qaarsut
- Opened: 25 September 1999
- Elevation AMSL: 289 ft / 88 m
- Coordinates: 70°44′03″N 052°41′46″W
- Website: Qaarsut Lufthavne

Map
- Location in Greenland

Runways
Direction	Length		Surface
Direction	m	ft	Surface
15/33	900	2,953	Gravel

Statistics (2012)
- Passengers: 7,105
- Source: Danish AIS

Qaarsut Airport (Greenlandic: Mittarfik Qaarsut) (IATA: JQA, ICAO: BGUQ) is an airport in Qaarsut, a settlement on the Nuussuaq Peninsula in Avannaata municipality in northwestern Greenland. It is equipped with a gravel runway, capable of serving STOL aircraft of Air Greenland in all seasons. There is a small cafeteria in the tiny arrivals/departures hall. It is connected by a 4 km (2.5 mi) gravel road to Qaarsut and is 13.5 nautical miles (25.0 km; 15.5 mi) northwest of Uummannaq.

== Overview ==
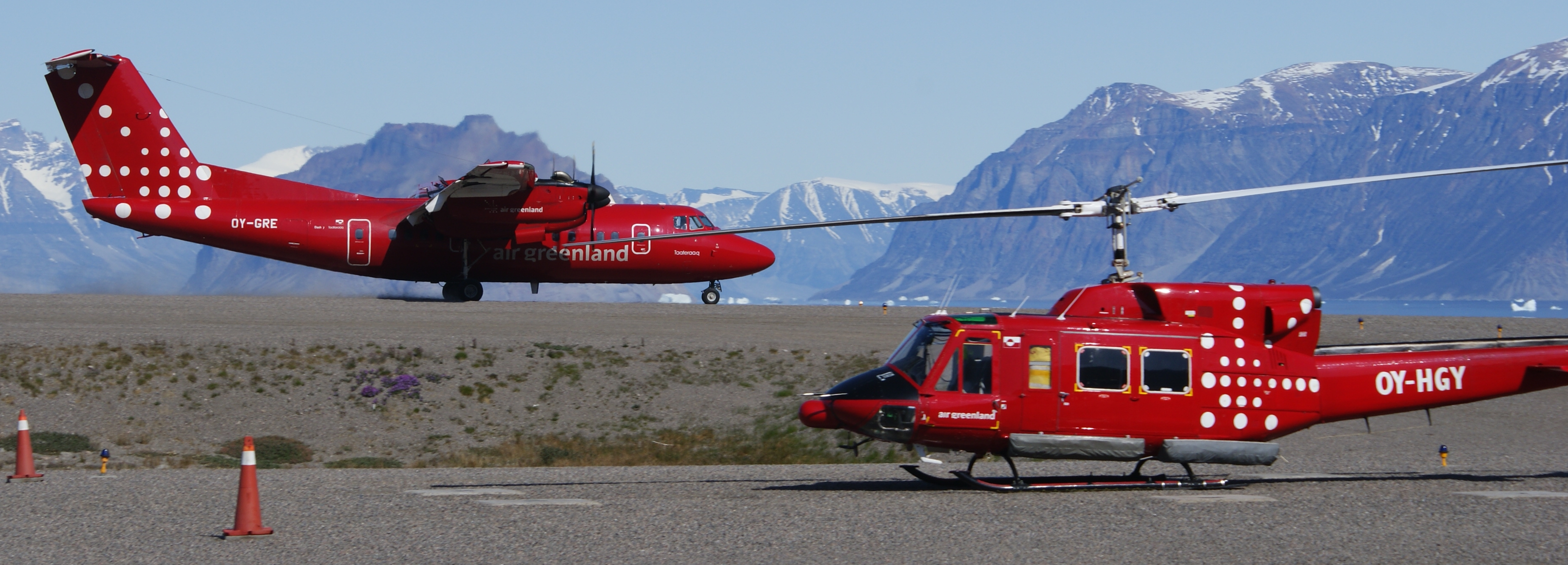
Air Greenland passengers transfer between Bell 212 helicopters and fixed-wing aircraft in Qaarsut

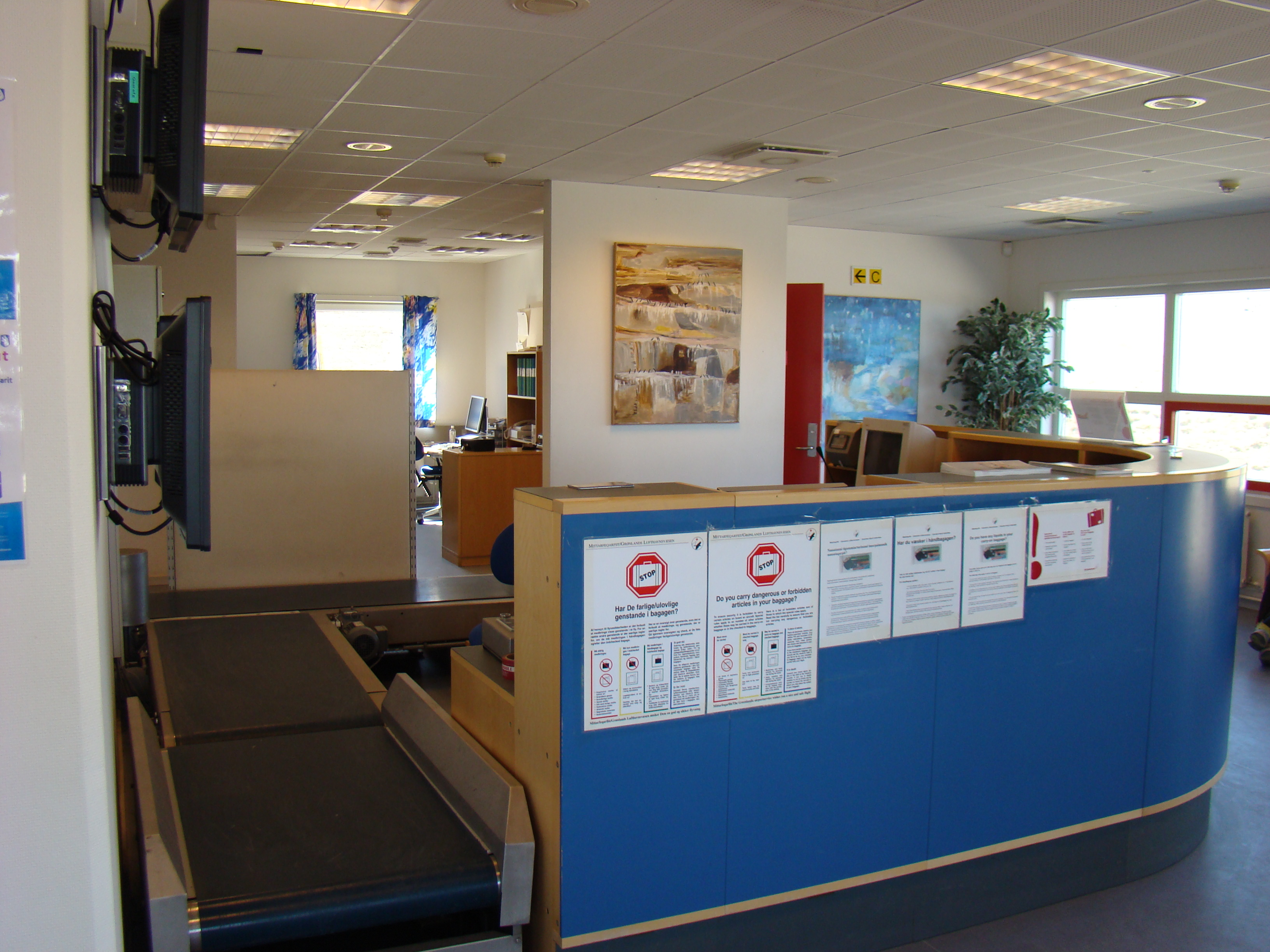
Check-in desk of Qaarsut Airport

Qaarsut airport was inaugurated on 25 September 1999, with the purpose of serving the much larger neighboring town of Uummannaq, 13.5 NM (25.0 km; 15.5 mi) southeast of the airport, located on an island of the same name in the south-central part of Uummannaq Fjord. The island−merely 23 km (14 mi) away in a direct line across Sarqarput Strait−is too small and rocky to host an airport of sufficient size to accommodate fixed-wing aircraft of Air Greenland.

The airport thus functions as a mini-hub for Uummannaq, with the terminal building labelled 'Uummannaq', regardless of its actual location, registration, documentation, and existing booking systems.

The decision to build the airport in Qaarsut was intended to solve the bottleneck on the Ilulissat-Uummannaq route (164 km), until then operated by Air Greenland with Sikorsky S-61N helicopters. Acquired in 1965, they were the oldest machines in the fleet of the airline.

The bottleneck problem is considered unsolved, since passengers must still be shuttled between the airport and Uummannaq Heliport. The primary function of the airport as a local hub has unintended consequences for communities of northern Greenland. Previously, all flights to Qaanaaq Airport included a stopover in Upernavik Airport. In order to avoid an overnight layover in Upernavik, all Qaanaaq-bound passengers had to travel via Qaarsut. Flights on the Ilulissat-Qaarsut route were often sold out, which given a single weekly flight to Qaanaaq, left passengers unable to travel to or from the northern communities, resulting in resentment. This changed and by 2017, it is possible to travel Ilulissat–Qaanaaq with direct flights, or one plane change in Upernavik without travelling via Qaarsut,

Proposals to close the airport have to date been rejected. Sunk costs, tourism potential for northwestern and northern Greenland, and the 2010 reinvigoration of the mining activities in Maamorilik northeast of Ukkusissat, as well as on Appat Island in the future−are the primary reasons for keeping the airport open.

== Airlines and destinations ==
Airlines	Destinations
Air Greenland	Ilulissat, Uummannaq
