= Saattut =

- Location within Greenland
- Coordinates: 70°48′42″N 51°38′00″W
- State: Kingdom of Denmark
- Constituent country: Greenland
- Municipality: Avannaata

Population (1 January 2025)
  - Total: 231
- Time zone: UTC−02:00 (Western Greenland Time)
  - Summer (DST): UTC−01:00 (Western Greenland Summer Time)
- Postal code: 3961 Uummannaq

Saattut (old spelling: Sâtut) is a settlement in Avannaata municipality, in northwestern Greenland. Located on small Saattut Island, southeast of Appat Island and northeast of Uummannaq in the Uummannaq Fjord system, the settlement had 231 inhabitants in 2025.

== Transport ==
Air Greenland serves the village as part of a government contract, with mostly cargo helicopter flights from Saattut Heliport to Ikerasak and Uummannaq.

Residents themselves often use dog sleds or snowmobiles for hunting trips or visits to relatives, as there are no roads connecting the village with other settlements. Saattut is home to about 500 sled dogs.

== Population ==
The population of Saattut has dropped by nearly a quarter relative to the 2000 levels, reflecting a general trend in the region. A November 2015 edition of National Geographic reported that the settlement is home to 200 people.

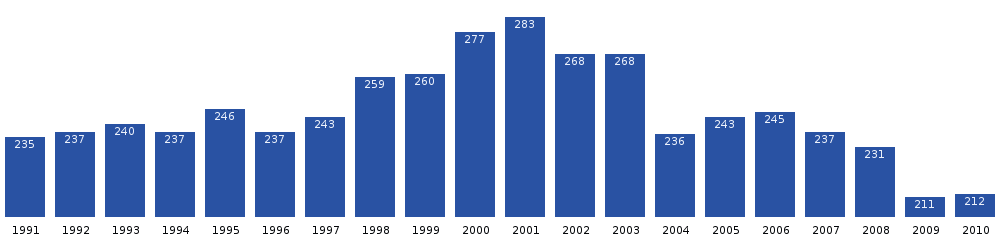
Saattut population growth dynamics in the last two decades. Source: Statistics Greenland
