= Ikerasak Island =

Island in Greenland

Ikerasak
- Location of Ikerasak Island
- Interactive map of Ikerasak

Geography
- Location: Uummannaq Fjord
- Coordinates: 70°33′N 51°30′W

Administration
- Greenland
- Municipality: Avannaata

Ikerasak Island (Greenlandic: Ikerasaap qeqertaa) is an island in Avannaata municipality in northwestern Greenland, located in the southeastern part of Uummannaq Fjord, at the mouth of Ikerasak Fjord, its innermost section.

== Geography ==
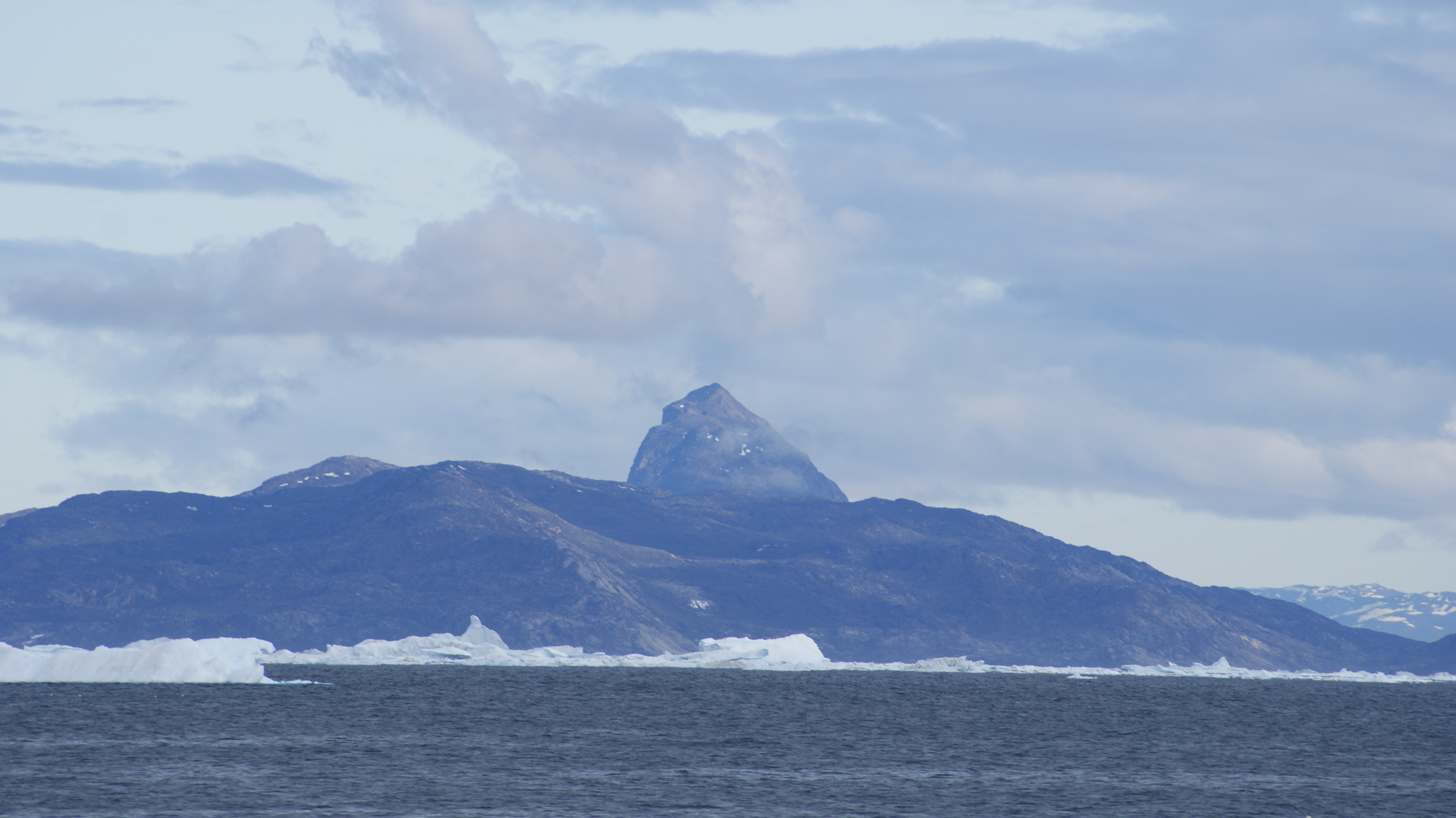
Ikerasak island seen from Uummannaq

The island has an elongated oval shape of southeast-to-northwest orientation. To the south, it is separated from a smaller Talerua Island by the Ikarasanguaq strait, and further from Nuussuaq Peninsula by the mouth of Ikerasak Fjord.

In the northeast, the narrow Ikerasassuaq strait separates it from Drygalski Peninsula on the mainland. To the northwest, the central arm of Uummannaq Fjord separates it from Salliaruseq Island.

== Settlement ==
Ikerasak is the only settlement on the island, perched at the southeastern tip, by the Ikerasassuaq strait.
