= Ikerasak Fjord =

Fjord in Avannaata, Greenland

Location of Ikerasak Fjord

Ikerasak Fjord (Greenlandic: Ikerasaup Sullua, also Qarajaq Icefjord, or Danish: Qarajaqs Isfjord) is a fjord in Avannaata municipality in northwestern Greenland.

== Geography ==
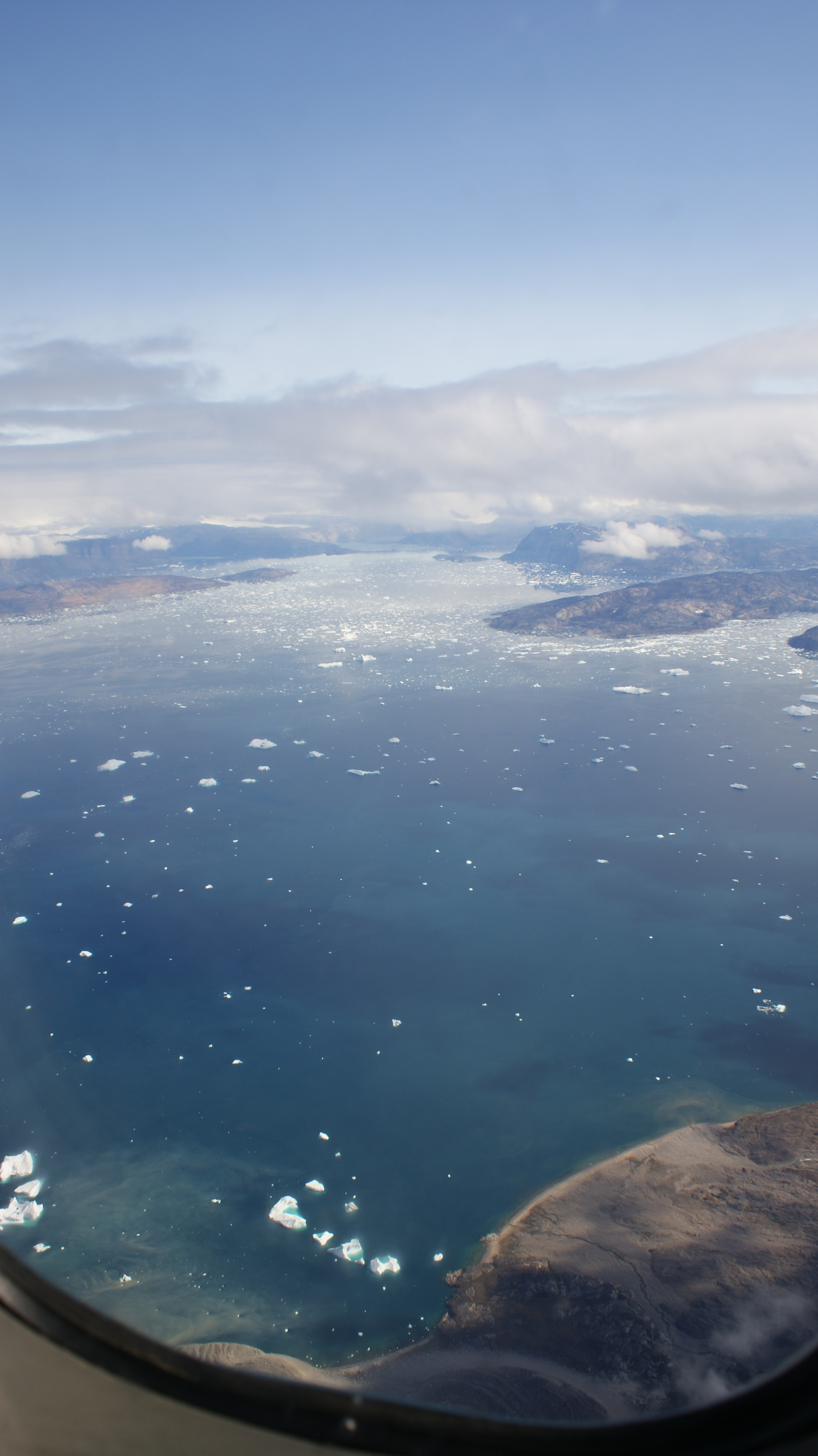
Aerial view of Ikerasak Fjord from Air Greenland de Havilland Canada Dash-7 during the Ilulissat−Qaarsut flight

The fjord constitutes the innermost part of the Uummannaq Fjord at the base of Nuussuaq Peninsula. The fjord has one tributary fjord in the north, Qaraassap Imaa, emptying into it at approximately 70°22′45″N 51°00′00″W, between Qaraasap Nunataa headland in the southeast and Drygalski Peninsula in the northwest.

=== Glaciers ===
The fjord is filled with ice calved off from the active Store Gletscher, which empties into the fjord at its innermost end, and which flows from the Greenland ice sheet (Greenlandic: Sermersuaq). It is one of the fastest moving glaciers in the world, moving at 5.7 km (3.5 mi) km per year. Lille Gletscher is another glacial tongue, emptying into Qaraasaap Imaa.

=== Tributary rivers ===
In the south–north, several rivers flow from Nuussuaq Peninsula into Ikerasak Fjord, the larger being Puiaqtukassaup Kuua and Kuussuaq. The valley of Kuussuaq is used for mountain trails traversing the peninsula. The trail begins at Kuussuup Nuua at the estuary of the river on the shore of the fjord, leading south through the only unglaciated part of the inner mountain range on the peninsula.

== Settlement ==
Ikerasak is the only settlement in the fjord, located on an oval-shaped Ikerasak Island in its northwestern part, where the fjord widens into the inner part of Uummannaq Fjord. Seasonal settlement on the shores of Nuussuaq Peninsula has been abandoned.

== Transport ==
The fjord can be reached by boat or seaplane, boats being either individually chartered from Ikerasak, or as part of the organized glacier sightseeing tour from Uummannaq. Ikerasak Heliport served by Air Greenland is the only aerodrome in the area, with connections to Uummmannaq and Saattut.
