= Ikerasak =

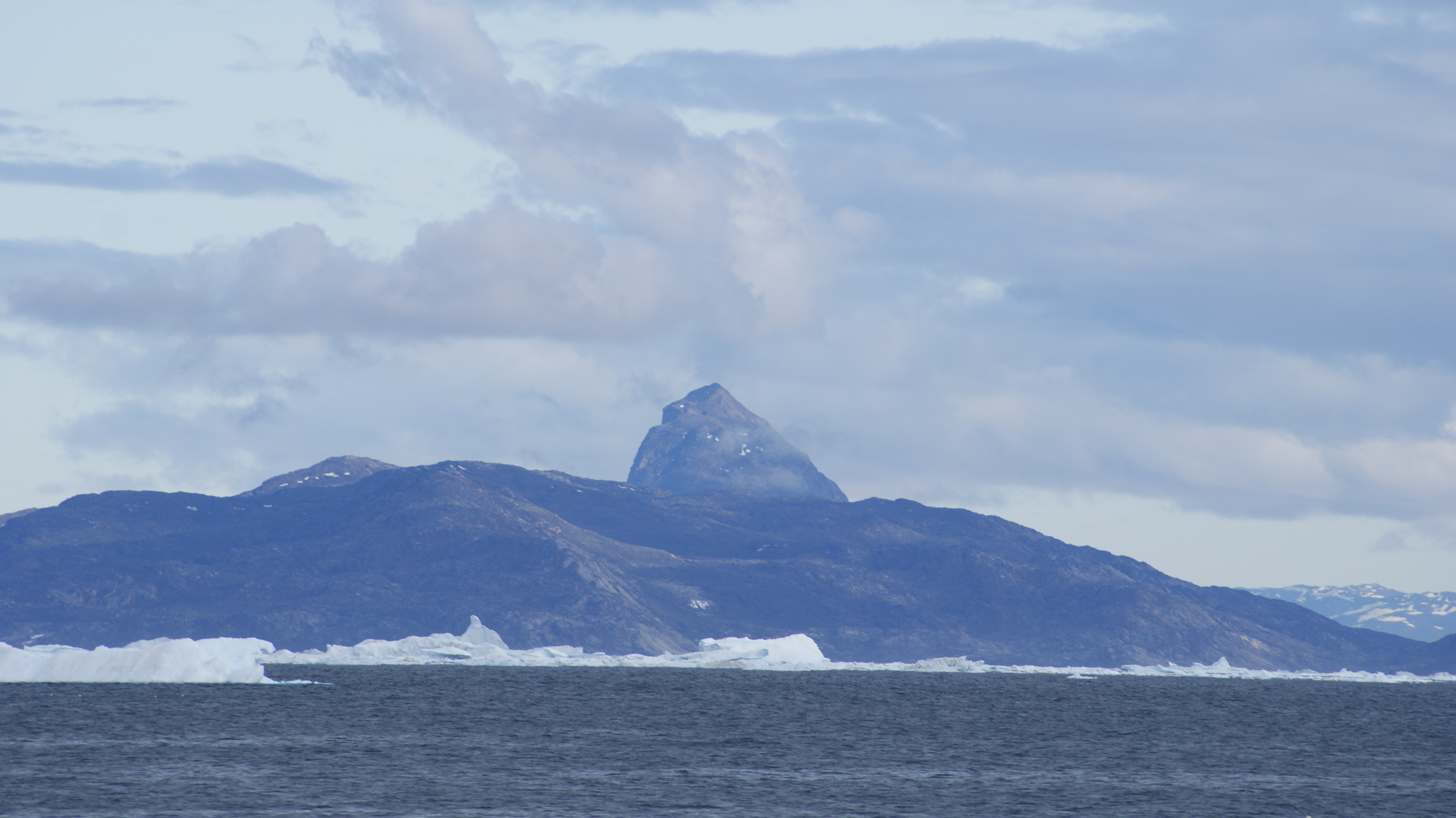
- Ikerasak island seen from Uummannaq

- Location within Greenland
- Coordinates: 70°30′10″N 51°18′10″W
- Sovereign state: Kingdom of Denmark
- Autonomous country: Greenland
- Municipality: Avannaata

Population (1 January 2025)
  - Total: 224
- Time zone: UTC−02:00 (Western Greenland Time)
  - Summer (DST): UTC−01:00 (Western Greenland Summer Time)
- Postal code: 3961 Uummannaq

Ikerasak (Greenlandic pronunciation: [ikɜʁasak]) is a village in the Avannaata municipality in western Greenland. It had 224 inhabitants in 2025.

== Geography ==
Ikerasak is located approximately 45 km southeast from Uummannaq, at the southeastern end of Ikerasak Island in the northwestern part of Ikerasak Fjord, where it widens into the inner part of Uummannaq Fjord.

The location at the heart of the Uummannaq ice fjord provides good fishing and catching opportunities both in summer and winter for seals, halibut, catfish, reindeer and musk oxen.

== Infrastructure ==
Ikerasak has a school with approximately 50 students, a shop, a community center, a medical clinic, a fish factory, a children's institution, and a retirement home with 3-4 beds. The retirement home is a regular house shared by the elderly residents. The church, originally a school chapel built in 1936, was converted into a church in 1980 and has a seating capacity of 150.

The clinic in the village offers daily consultations. In the event of more severe illnesses, individuals are transported by air or sea to the hospital in Uummannaq, where doctors and nurses are available. The doctor and dentist from Uummannaq visit the village multiple times a year. In most instances, it is possible to schedule a doctor's and dentist's appointment while visiting Uummannaq for other reasons.

== Transport ==
There are no roads in the settlement and therefore no cars, all transport takes place via the inhabitants' small dinghies, snowmobiles or dog sleds. The area around the settlement is scenic and it is possible to go for walks in the area.

Air Greenland serves the village as part of government contract, with flights between Ikerasak Heliport and Uummannaq Heliport. In 2008, Ikerasak Heliport had 99 departures with over 380 departing passengers.

== Population ==
The population of Ikerasak has fluctuated over the last two decades, slightly decreasing in the last several years.

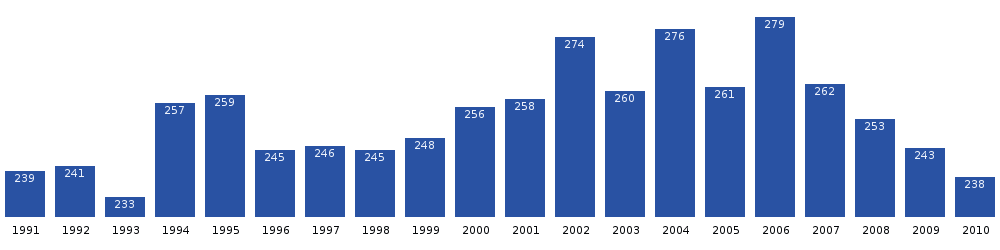
Ikerasak population growth dynamics in the last two decades. Source: Statistics Greenland

== Notable people ==
- Ellen Christoffersen (born 1972), politician
- Jørgen Fleischer (1924–2012), journalist
- Peter Fleischer (1904–1977), politician
