= Uummannaq Fjord =

Fjord system in Greenland

Coordinates: 70°57′N 53°00′W

Geography of Uummannaq Fjord

Uummannaq Fjord is a large fjord system in the northern part of western Greenland, the largest after Kangertittivaq fjord in eastern Greenland. It has a roughly south-east to west-north-west orientation, emptying into the Baffin Bay in the northwest.

== Geography ==
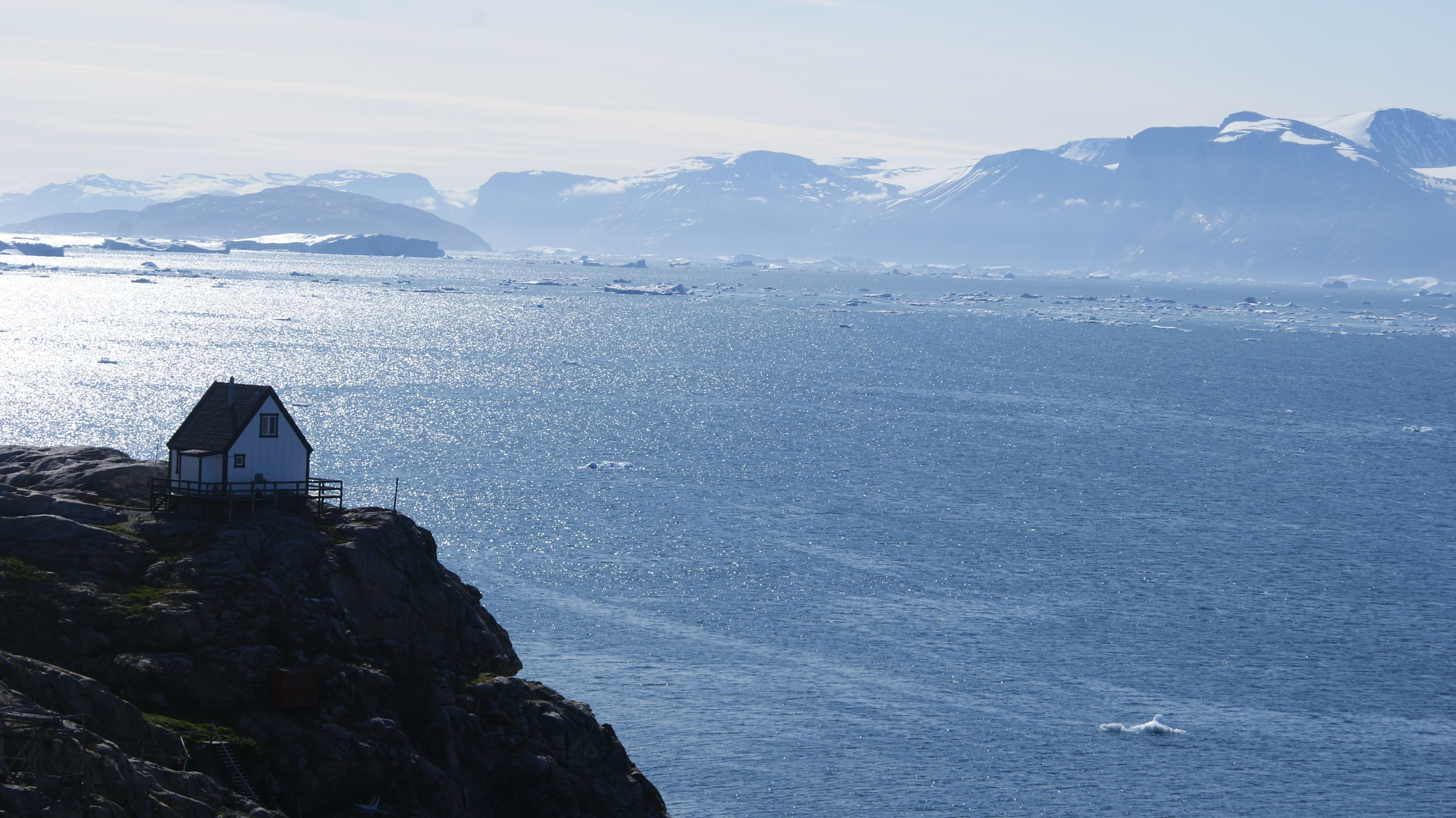
Sarqarput Strait in southwestern Uummannaq Fjord separates Nuussuaq Peninsula from Uummannaq Island

With the exception of the southwestern coast formed by the Nuussuaq Peninsula, Uummannaq fjord has a developed coastline, with many bays, islands, and peninsulas.

=== Tributary fjords ===
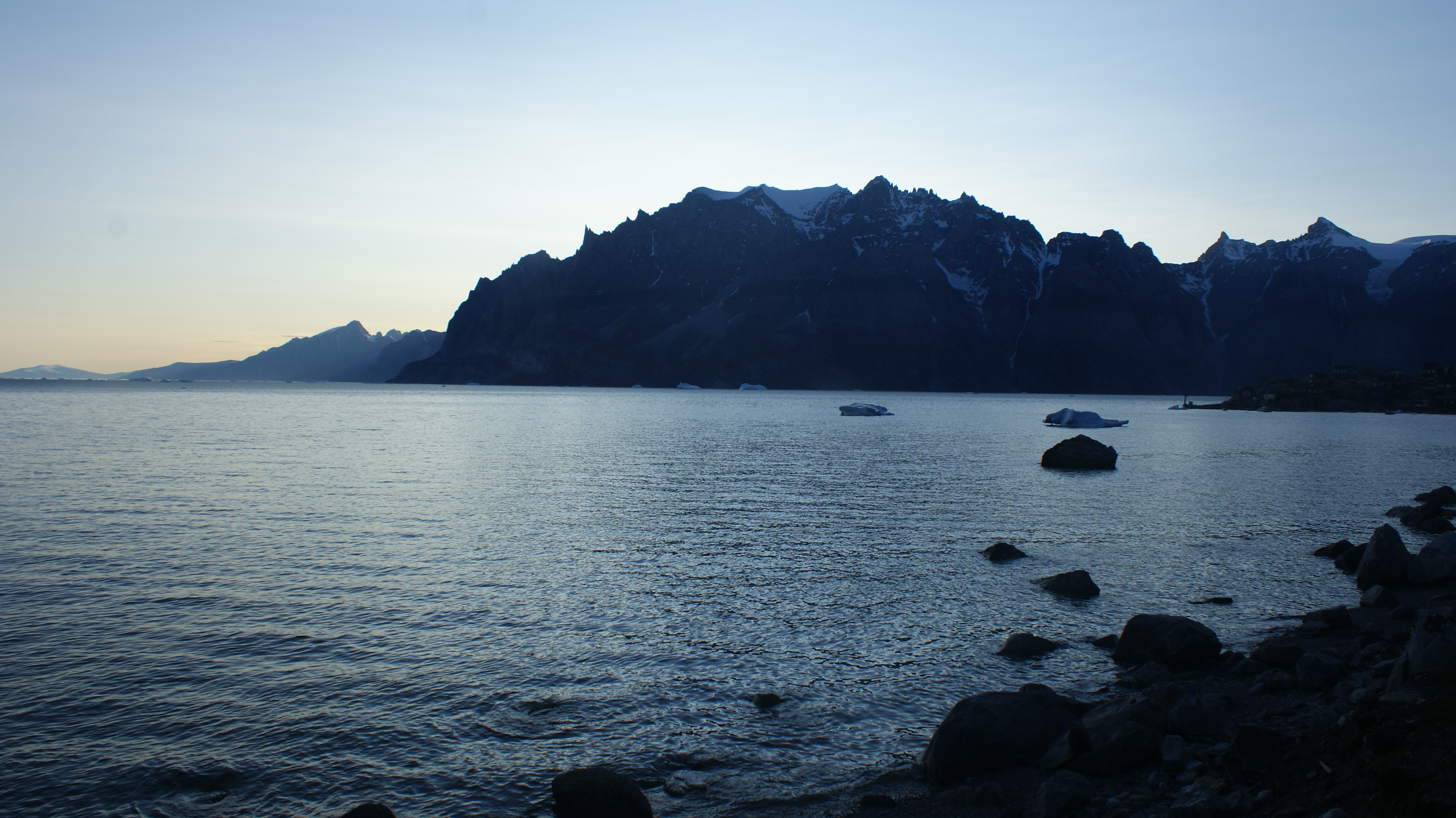
Northeastern Uummannaq Fjord is bounded by steep mountain walls, some nearly 2000 metres high

South to north:

- Ikerasak Fjord (Greenlandic: Ikerasaup Sullua, also Qarajaq Icefjord) − the innermost part of the fjord at the base of Nuussuaq Peninsula. Store Gletscher flowing from the Greenland Ice Sheet empties into Ikerasak Fjord.
- Qaraassap Imaa − a tributary fjord emptying into Ikerasak Fjord from the north, between Qaraasap Nunataa headland in the southeast, and Drygalski Peninsula in the northwest. Lille Gletscher flowing from the ice sheet empties into Qaraasaap Imaa.
- Sermillip Kangerlua − a tributary fjord with several inlets of its own, emptying into the main arm of Uummannaq Fjord from the east, to the southeast of Salliaruseq Island. From the south, it is bounded by Drygalski Peninsula. From the north, it is bounded by the Itillarssuup Qaqaa peninsula.
- Itillarsuup Kangerlua − a long tributary fjord, emptying into the main arm of Uummannaq Fjord from the east. From the southwest, it is bounded by the Itillarsuup Qaqaa peninsula. From the northeast, it abuts the inner envelope of the island of Greenland, with Kangilleq and Sermeq Sillarleq glaciers emptying into it. From the north, it is bounded by the long Ukkusissat Peninsula. Appat Island lies at the mouth of the fjord, separated from the Ukkusissat peninsula by the Torsukattak Strait, an extension of Itillarsuup Kangerlua.
- Perlerfiup Kangerlua − a long tributary fjord, emptying into the northeastern part of the Uummannaq Fjord. From the south it is bounded by the Ukkusissat Peninsula. From the north it is bounded by the Perlerfiup Nunaa peninsula.

=== Islands ===
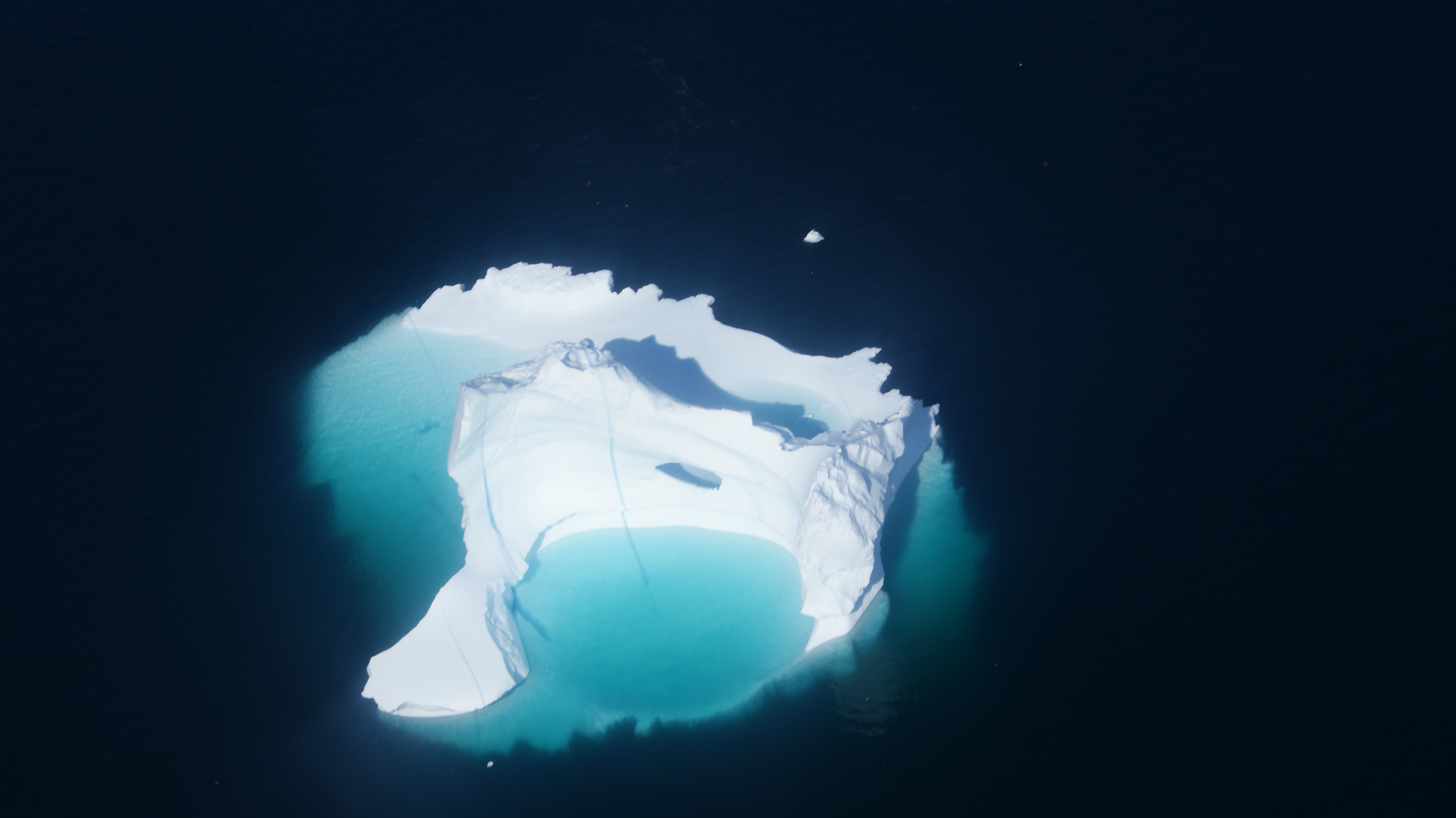
In the summer, numerous small icebergs, bergy bits, and growlers float freely in the Uummannaq Fjord

The following are the major islands of Uummannaq Fjord:

- Appat Island
- Ikerasak Island
- Illorsuit Island
- Saattut Island
- Salleq Island
- Salliaruseq Island
- Talerua Island
- Upernivik Island − at 540 km^{2} (210 mi^{2}) the largest island
- Uummannaq Island − dominated by the prominent Uummannaq Mountain

== Settlement ==
=== Prehistory ===
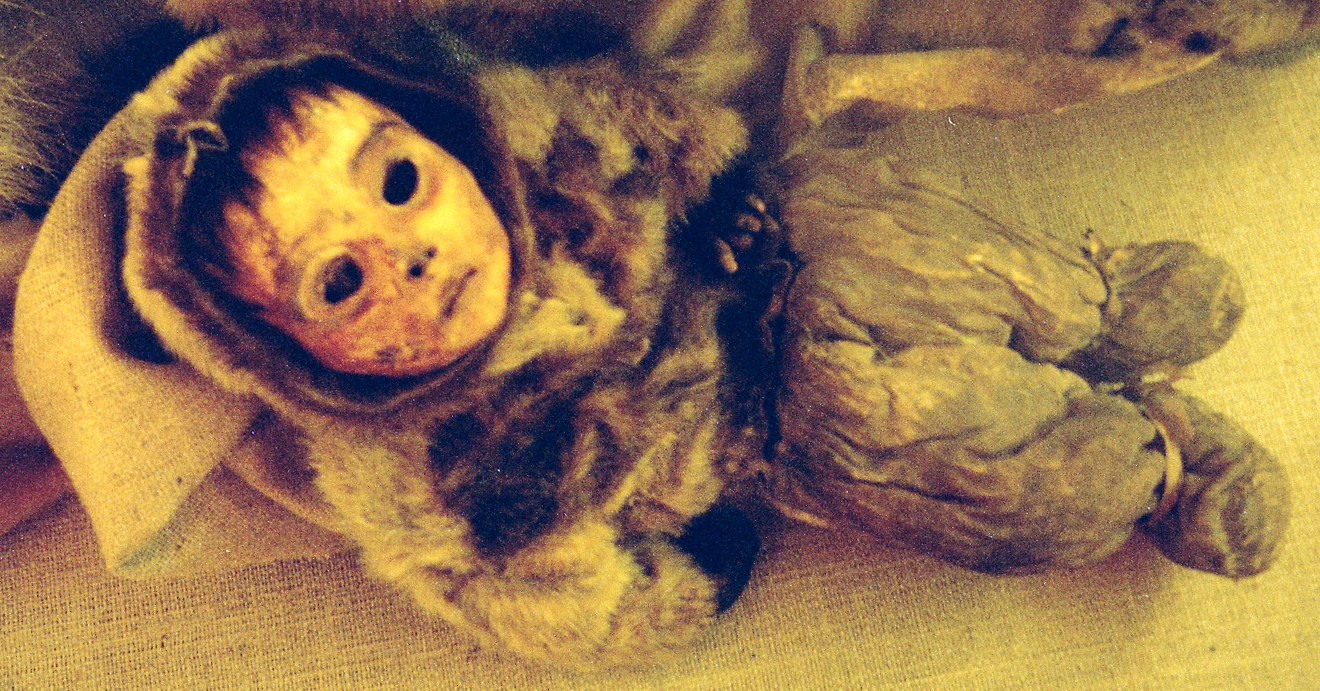
The mummy of a six-month-old boy found in Qilakitsoq

Sheltered from the coastal winds by the high, glaciated mountains of the Nuussuaq Peninsula, the area of Uummannaq Fjord is considered the sunniest spot in Greenland. Favourable weather conditions, good harbours, and proximity to the coastal route made the fjord system attractive to numerous southbound Inuit migrations in the past−the area has been settled and resettled for the last 4.500 years.

==== Excavations at Qilakitsoq ====
Archaeological excavations in Qilakitsoq on the northeastern shore Nuussuaq Peninsula due south of Uummannaq Island revealed the existence of an ancient Arctic culture, later named the Saqqaq culture, which inhabited the area of west-central Greenland between 2500 BCE and 800 BCE.

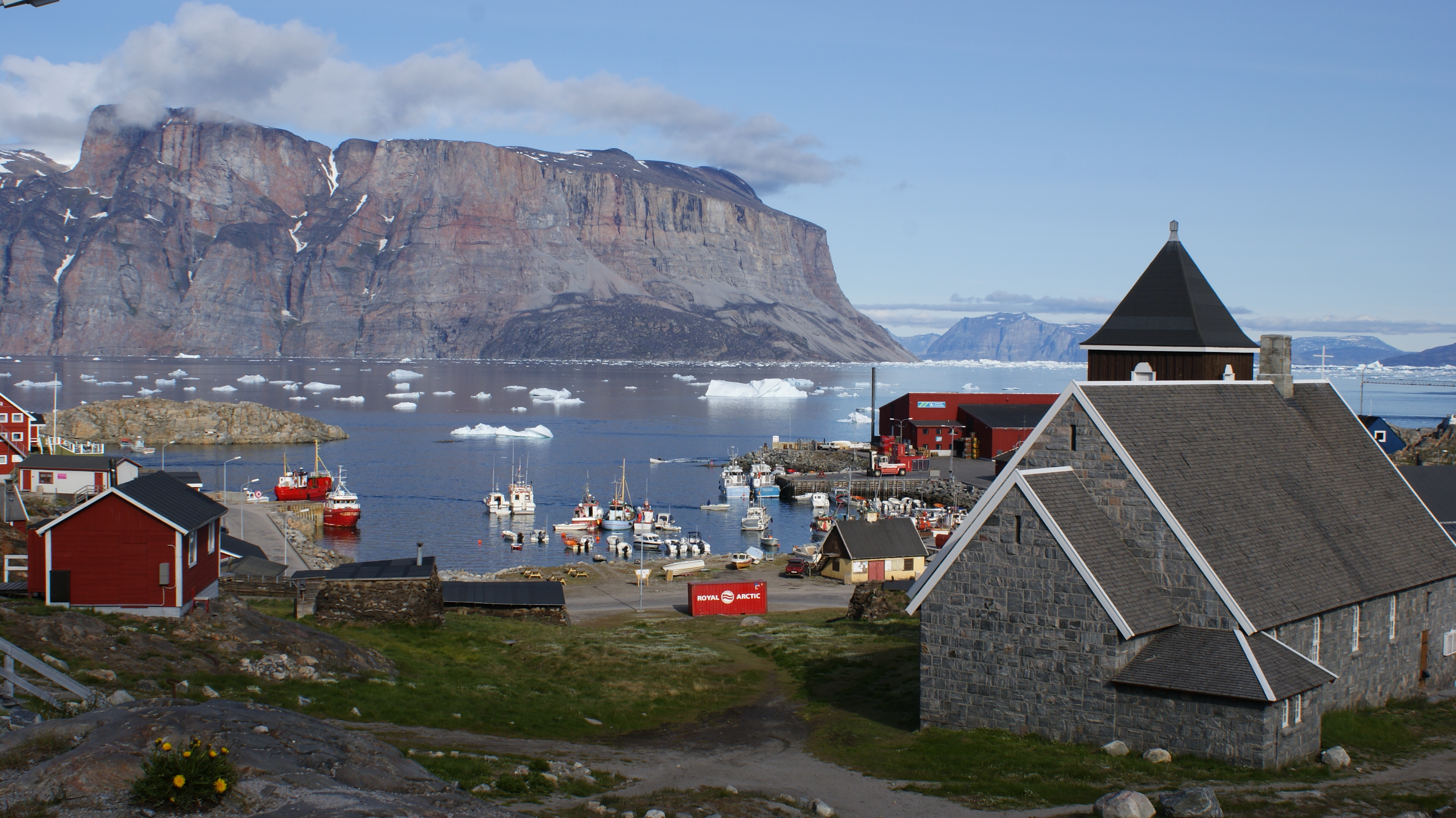
Uummannaq town is the largest settlement in the area

Recent DNA samples from human hair suggest that the ancient Saqqaq people came from Siberia about 5,500 years ago and independent of the migration that gave rise to the modern Native Americans and the Inuit.

=== Modern settlement ===
During the early phases of Greenlandic exploration, the fjord was known as Jacob's Bight and Omenak Fjord.

The main urban settlement today is Uummannaq, once an administrative center of a municipality which covered the entire catchment area of Uummannaq Fjord, and now part of Avannaata municipality of northwestern Greenland, the largest municipality in the country. Ikerasak, Illorsuit, Nuugaatsiaq, and Saattut are small island settlements, whereas Ukkusissat lies on the mainland in the inner parts of the fjord.

The northeastern coastline of Nuussuaq Peninsula is sparsely inhabited or uninhabited in the south, with Qaarsut and Niaqornat near the mouth of the fjord being the only settlements. Sigguup Nunaa peninsula and adjacent lands between the mouth of the fjord and Upernavik Archipelago in the north are uninhabited.

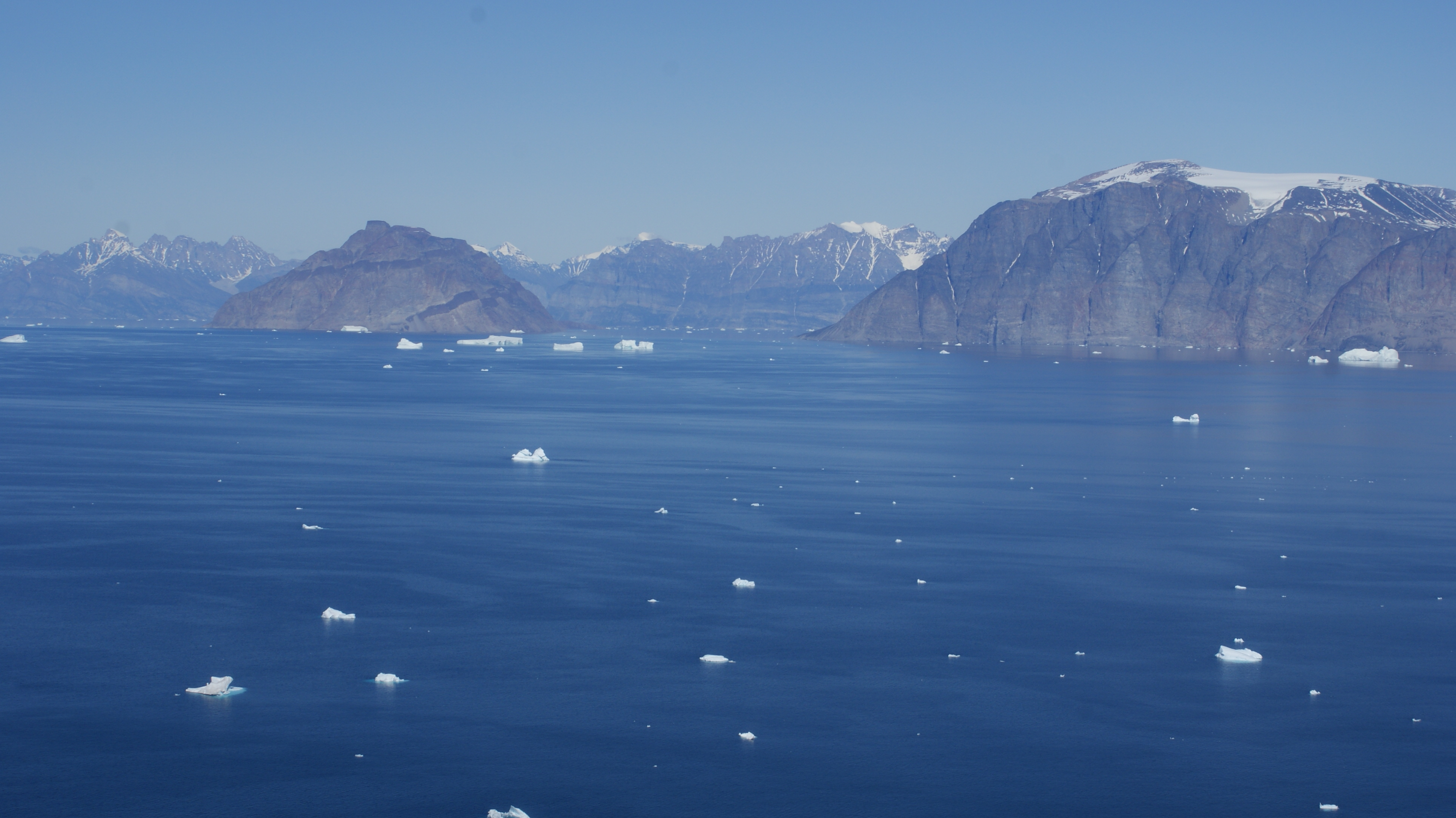
Aerial view of the central expanse of Uummannaq Fjord, with Salleq Island, Appat Island, and Perlerfiup Nunaa in the background

Settlement	Latitude N	Longitude W	Population	Notes
Nuugaatsiaq	71°32'06"	53°12'45"	94	The northernmost settlement
Illorsuit	71°14'30"	53°34'00"	99	
Ukkusissat	71°02'57"	51°53'15"	184	
Saattut	70°48'42"	51°38'00"	243	
Niaqornat	70°47'20"	53°39'50"	68	The smallest settlement
Qaarsut	70°43'55"	52°38'15"	200	Host to the only airport in the area
Uummannaq	70°40'29"	52°07'35"	1500	The only town of any size and a cultural center
Ikerasak	70°30'10"	51°18'10"	261	The southernmost settlement
