= Qaarsut =

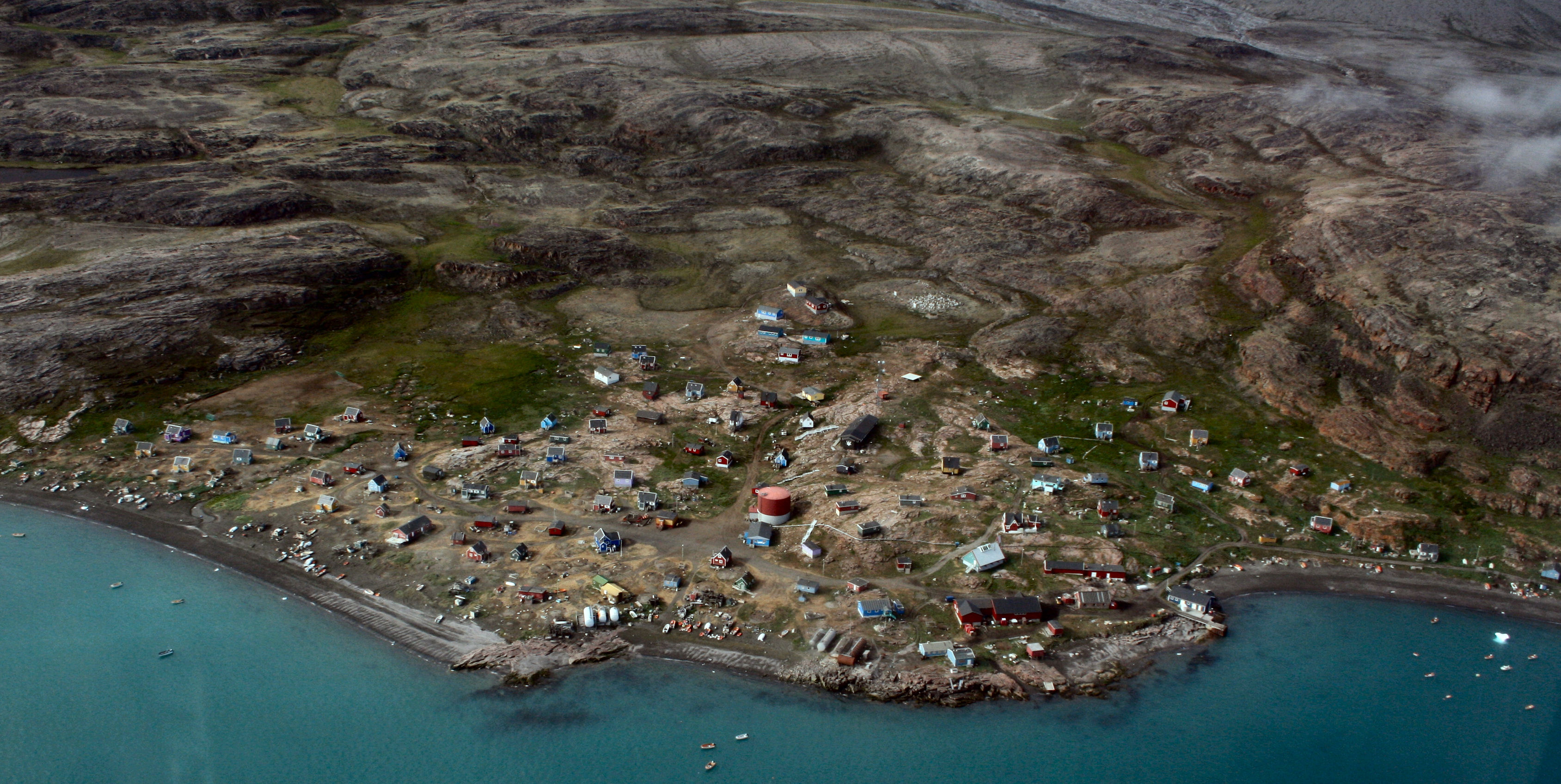
- Aerial panorama of Qaarsut

- Location within Greenland
- Coordinates: 70°43′55″N 52°38′15″W
- State: Kingdom of Denmark
- Constituent country: Greenland
- Municipality: Avannaata

Government
  - Mayor: Ole Dorph

Population (1 January 2025)
  - Total: 172
- Time zone: UTC−02:00 (Western Greenland Time)
  - Summer (DST): UTC−01:00 (Western Greenland Summer Time)
- Postal code: 3964 Qaarsut

Qaarsut (old spelling: Kʼaersut) is a settlement in Avannaata municipality, in northwestern Greenland. It is situated on the northeastern shore of the Nuussuaq Peninsula. It had 172 inhabitants in 2025.

== Geography ==
The village is located on the north coast of the Nuussuaq Peninsula. It is at the foot of the 1,977 m (6,486 ft) high Qilertinnguit mountain, which shelters the settlement from the coastal winds. Qaarsut is approximately 20 km (12 mi) northwest of the main town of Uummannaq.

=== Climate ===
Qaarsut experiences a tundra climate (Köppen: ET); with short, quite cool summers and long, frigid winters. Its position in the lee of Qilertinnguit mountain can occasionally cause strong foehn winds from the southeast, raising the temperature above freezing even in winter.

Climate data for Qaarsut Airport (70.73°N 52.68°W) (88 m (289 ft) AMSL) (2000-2020 data)
Month	Jan	Feb	Mar	Apr	May	Jun	Jul	Aug	Sep	Oct	Nov	Dec	Year
Record high °C (°F)	8.0 (46.4)	9.2 (48.6)	9.6 (49.3)	14.4 (57.9)	18.2 (64.8)	18.7 (65.7)	21.4 (70.5)	20.6 (69.1)	16.4 (61.5)	14.0 (57.2)	9.7 (49.5)	11.2 (52.2)	21.4 (70.5)
Mean daily maximum °C (°F)	−8.9 (16.0)	−11.2 (11.8)	−10.6 (12.9)	−4.7 (23.5)	2.7 (36.9)	9.0 (48.2)	12.2 (54.0)	10.6 (51.1)	4.8 (40.6)	−0.3 (31.5)	−4.4 (24.1)	−6.8 (19.8)	−0.6 (30.9)
Daily mean °C (°F)	−11.6 (11.1)	−14.3 (6.3)	−14.3 (6.3)	−8.6 (16.5)	−0.4 (31.3)	5.8 (42.4)	9.1 (48.4)	7.7 (45.9)	2.5 (36.5)	−2.5 (27.5)	−6.8 (19.8)	−9.1 (15.6)	−3.5 (25.7)
Mean daily minimum °C (°F)	−14.3 (6.3)	−17.4 (0.7)	−17.6 (0.3)	−12.4 (9.7)	−3.3 (26.1)	2.9 (37.2)	6.0 (42.8)	4.7 (40.5)	0.0 (32.0)	−4.8 (23.4)	−9.1 (15.6)	−11.6 (11.1)	−6.4 (20.5)
Record low °C (°F)	−30.3 (−22.5)	−31.9 (−25.4)	−33.9 (−29.0)	−27.7 (−17.9)	−16.2 (2.8)	−4.3 (24.3)	−1.1 (30.0)	−0.9 (30.4)	−9.6 (14.7)	−14.0 (6.8)	−18.8 (−1.8)	−27.4 (−17.3)	−33.9 (−29.0)
Average precipitation mm (inches)	16 (0.6)	16 (0.6)	17 (0.7)	17 (0.7)	16 (0.6)	22 (0.9)	28 (1.1)	28 (1.1)	36 (1.4)	28 (1.1)	33 (1.3)	25 (1.0)	280 (11.0)
Average precipitation days (≥ 0.1 mm)	10	9	10	10	8	7	8	9	11	11	14	12	118
Average relative humidity (%)	63.0	64.6	66.3	67.8	75.0	75.2	71.6	69.6	67.1	63.1	62.4	62.0	67.3
Source 1: Danish Meteorological Institute (1981-2020 data)
Source 2: Climates To Travel

== History ==
Until January 2009, the settlement belonged to Uummannaq Municipality.

The first coal mine in Greenland operated between 1778 and 1924 in Qaarsuarsuit.

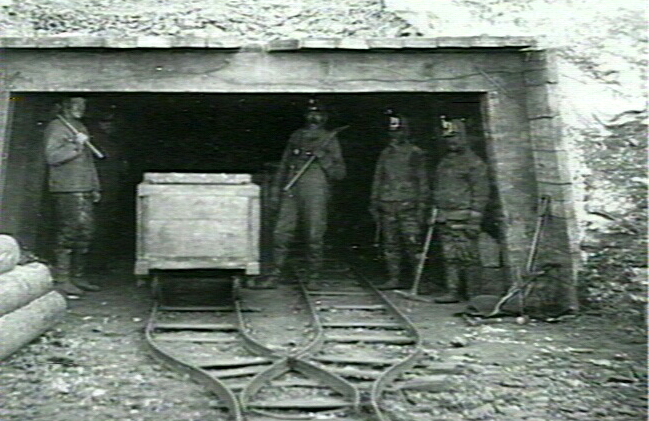
The Qaarsuarsuit coal mine in 1907

=== Inuit settlement ===
A few kilometres east of Qaarsut is the Inuit settlement Qilakitsoq. The settlement is known for the discovery in 1972 of eight mummified bodies from the Thule culture. The mummies of Qilakitsoq provided important insight into the lives of Inuit who lived 500 years ago in the Thule culture.

== Infrastructure ==
The school and the church are housed in the same building. Additionally, the village provides essential amenities such as a shop, service center, and health station.

=== Education ===
In 2011, the school had a total of 40 students, spanning from 1st to 9th grade, but organized into just four classes. The school is part of the Greenlandic school network, known as ATTAT, and is equipped with video conference equipment for teaching purposes.

== Transport ==
Qaarsut Airport, located to the northwest of the settlement, serves both Qaarsut and Uummannaq, the latter accessible only by helicopter.

== Population ==
The population of Qaarsut has dropped by over 18 percent relative to the 2000 levels, reflecting a general trend in the region.

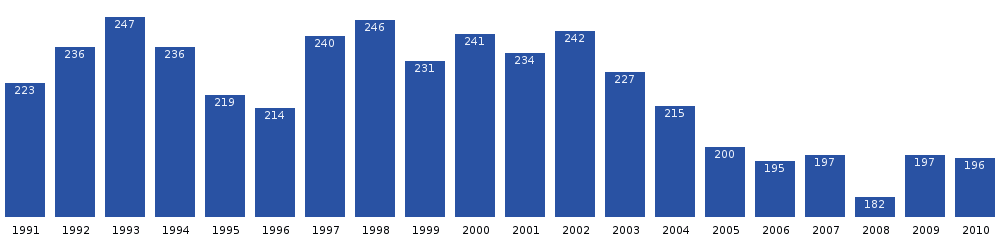
Qaarsut population growth dynamics in the last two decades. Source: Statistics Greenland

== Gallery ==
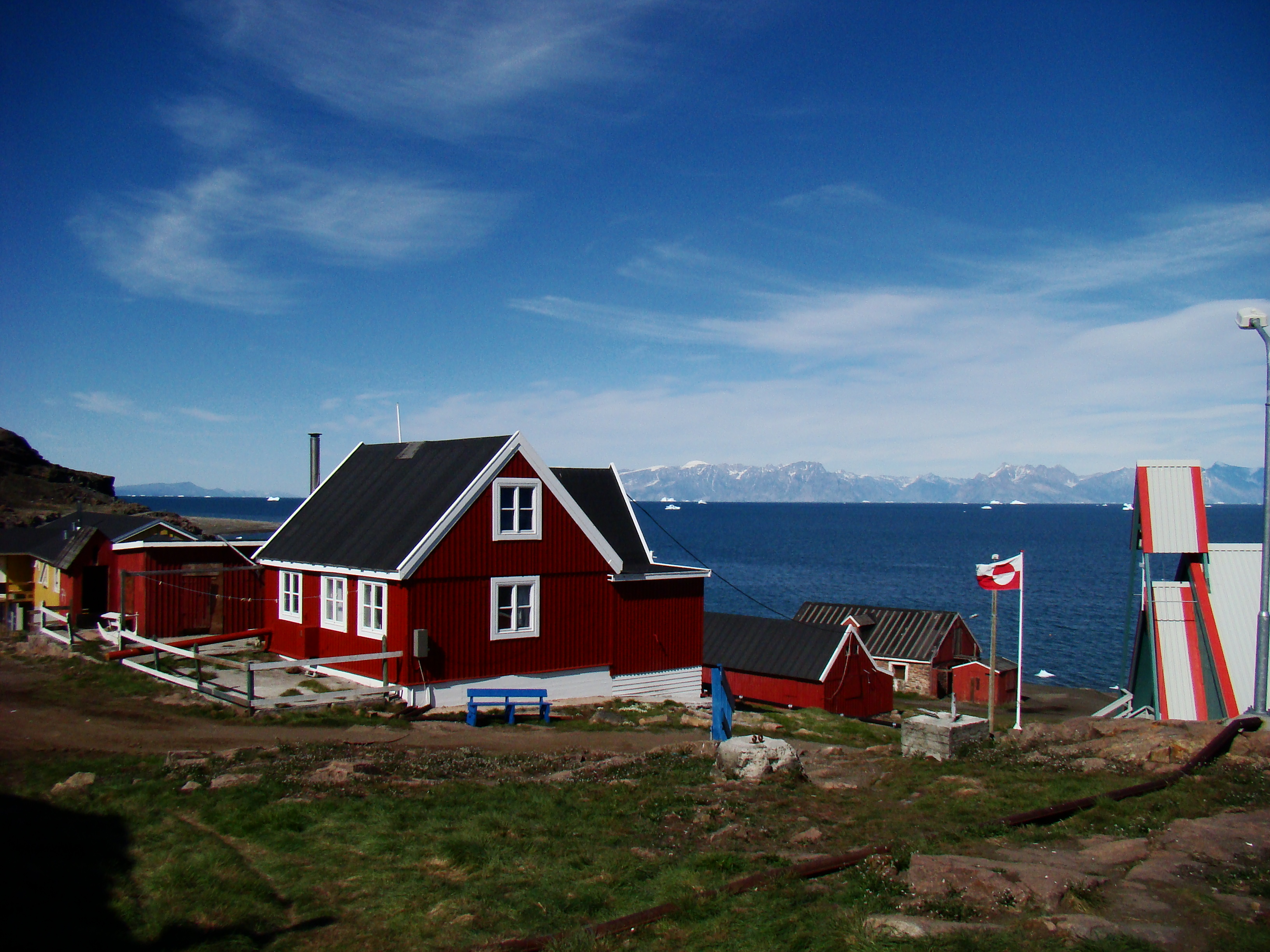
Qaarsut's chapel

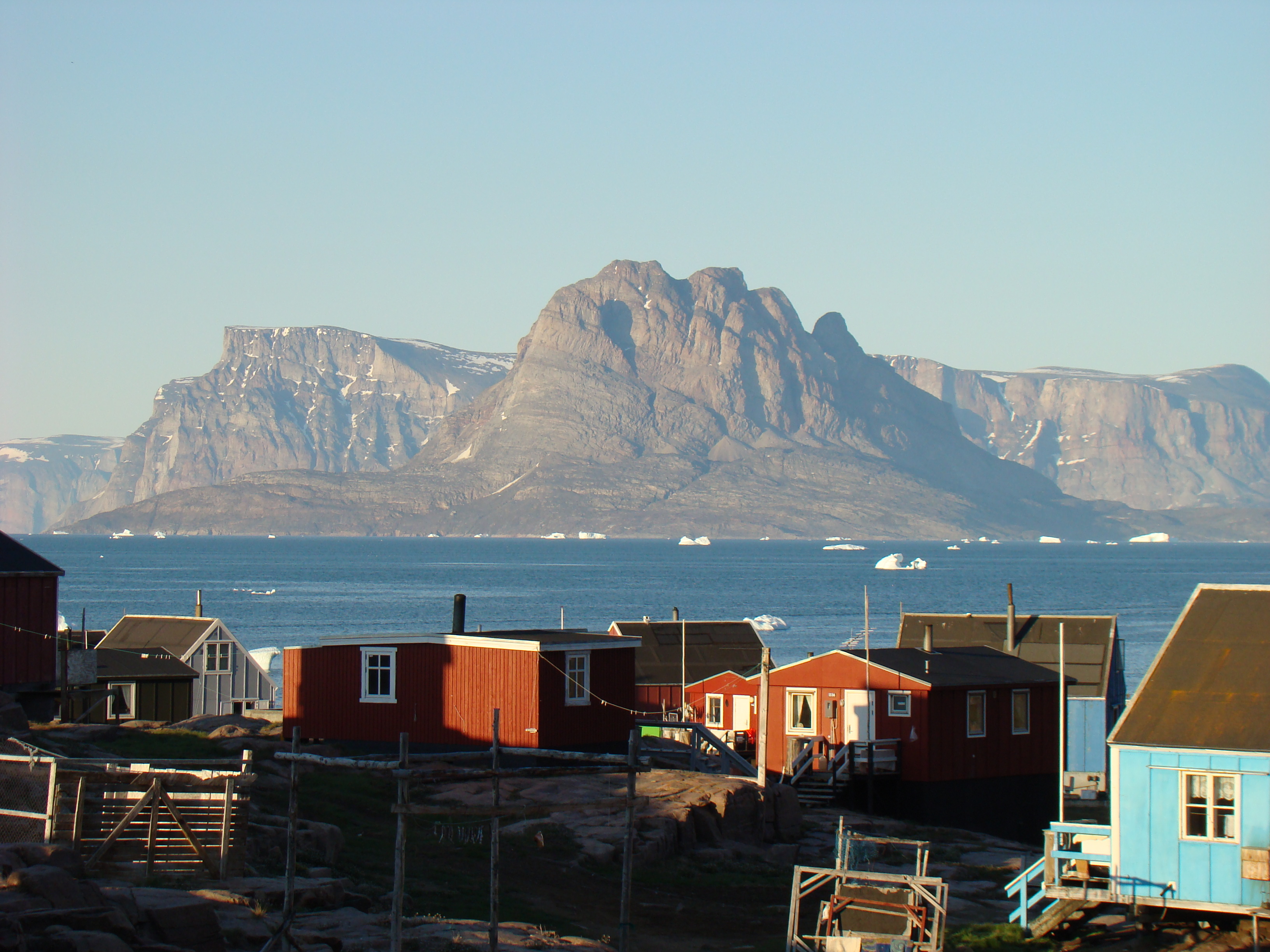
Qaarsut and Uummannaq's mountain in the background

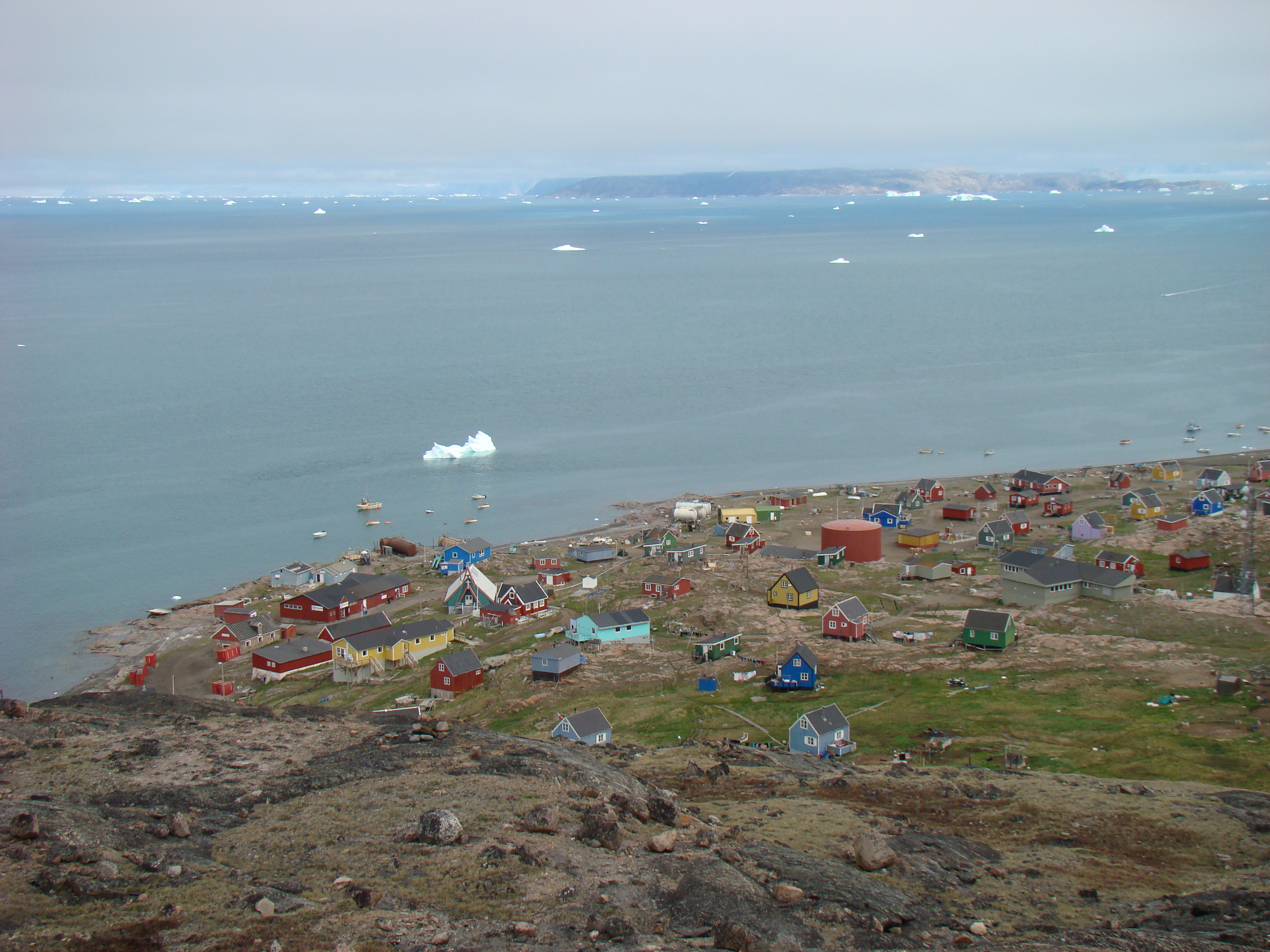
Overview of Qaarsut

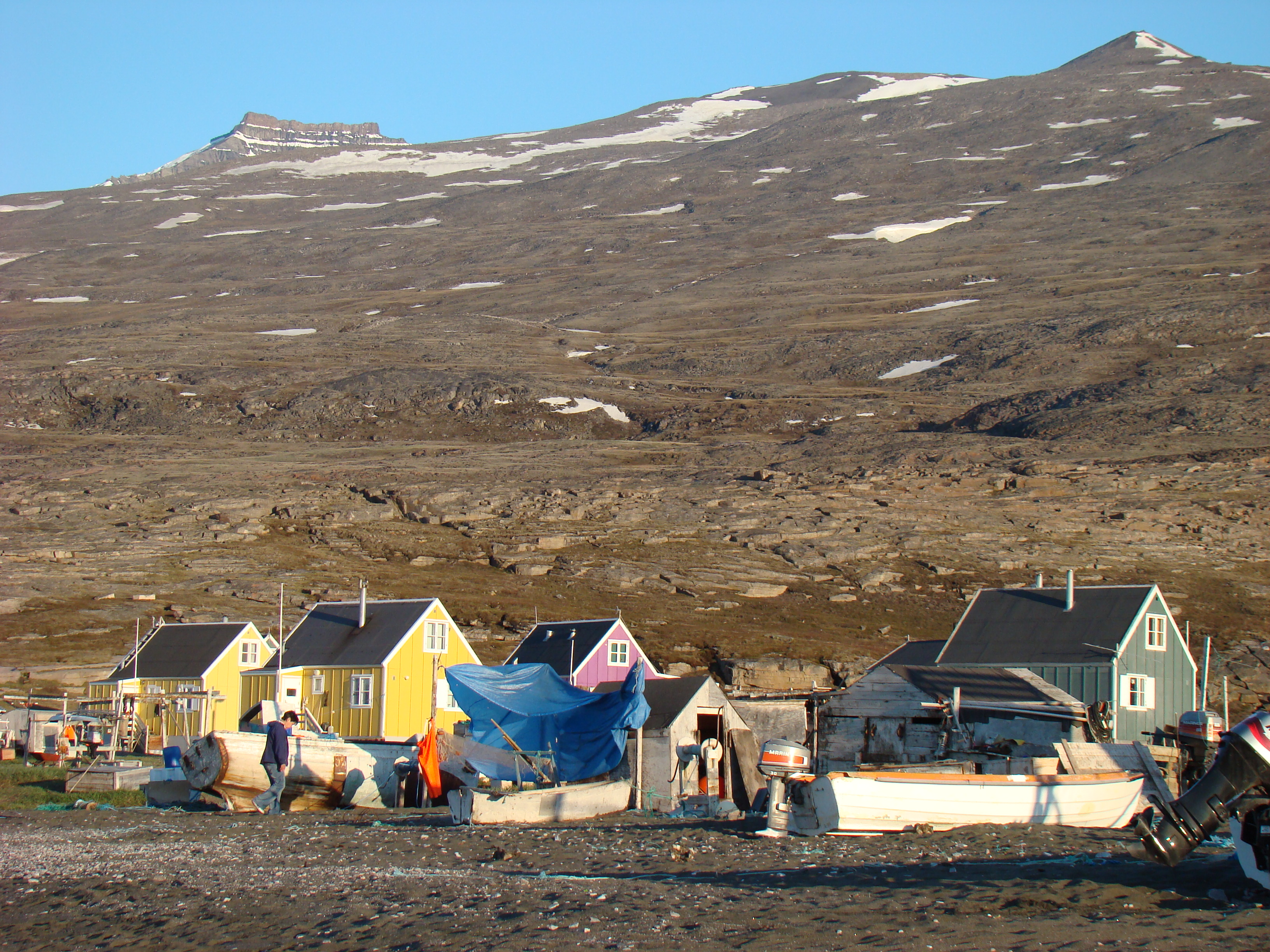
Colourful houses

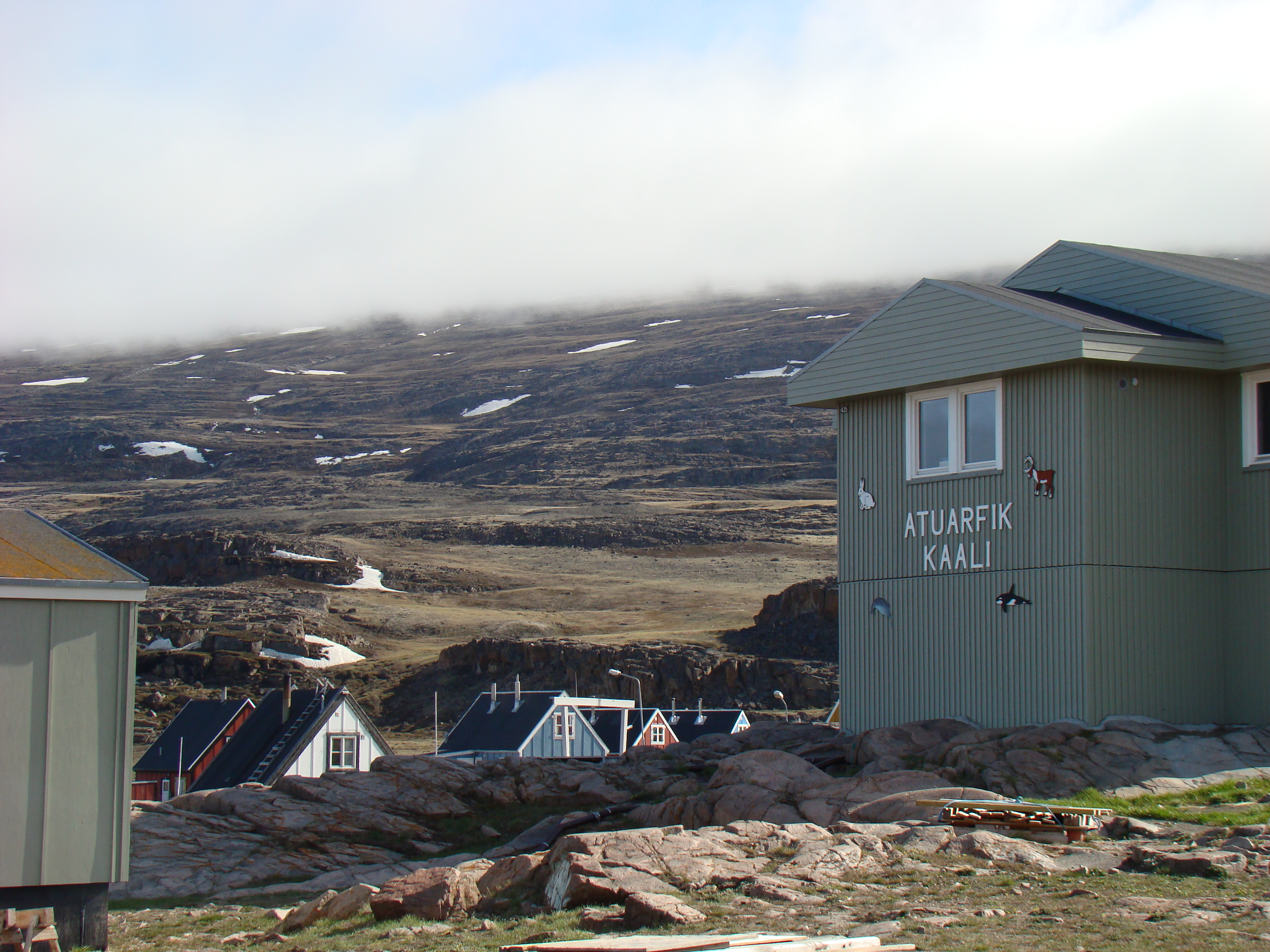
School

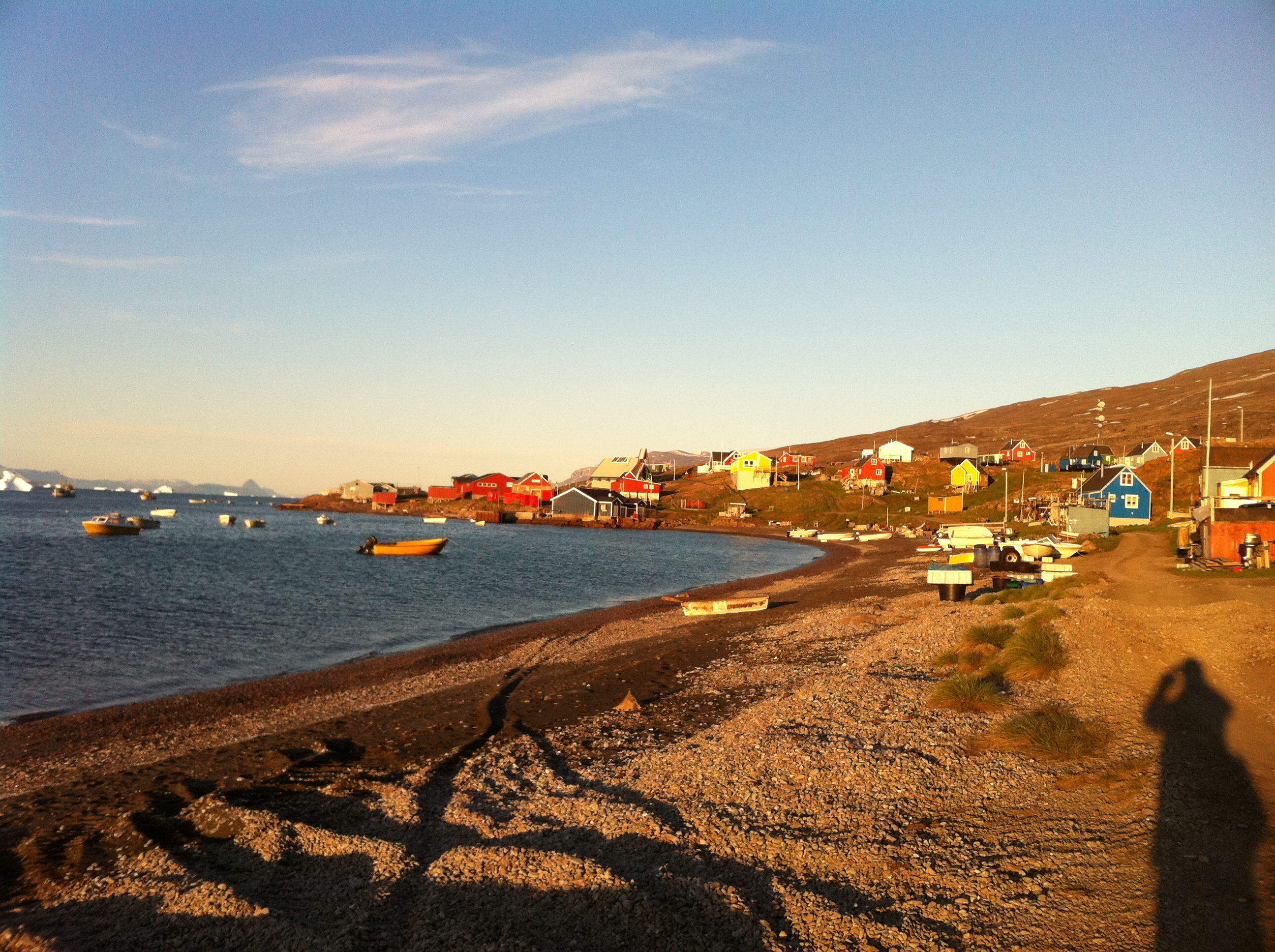
Qaarsut at midnight sun
