= Uummannaq =

Town in Greenland

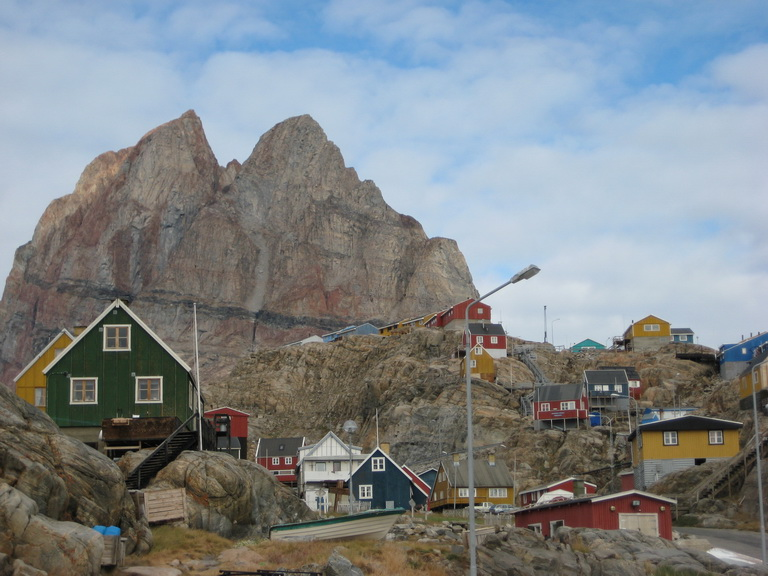
- Uummannaq in August 2008

- Location within Greenland
- Coordinates: 70°40′29″N 52°07′35″W
- State: Kingdom of Denmark
- Constituent country: Greenland
- Municipality: Avannaata
- Founded: 1763

Population (2025)
  - Total: 1,391
- Time zone: UTC−02:00 (Western Greenland Time)
  - Summer (DST): UTC−01:00 (Western Greenland Summer Time)
- Postal code: 3961

Uummannaq is a town on Uummannaq Island in the Avannaata municipality, in central-western Greenland. With 1,407 inhabitants in 2020, it is the eighth-largest town in Greenland, and is home to the country's most northerly ferry terminal. Founded in 1763 as Omenak, the town is a hunting and fishing base, with a canning factory and a marble quarry. In 1932, the Universal Greenland-Filmexpedition with director Arnold Fanck released the film S.O.S. Eisberg near Uummannaq.

== Geography ==
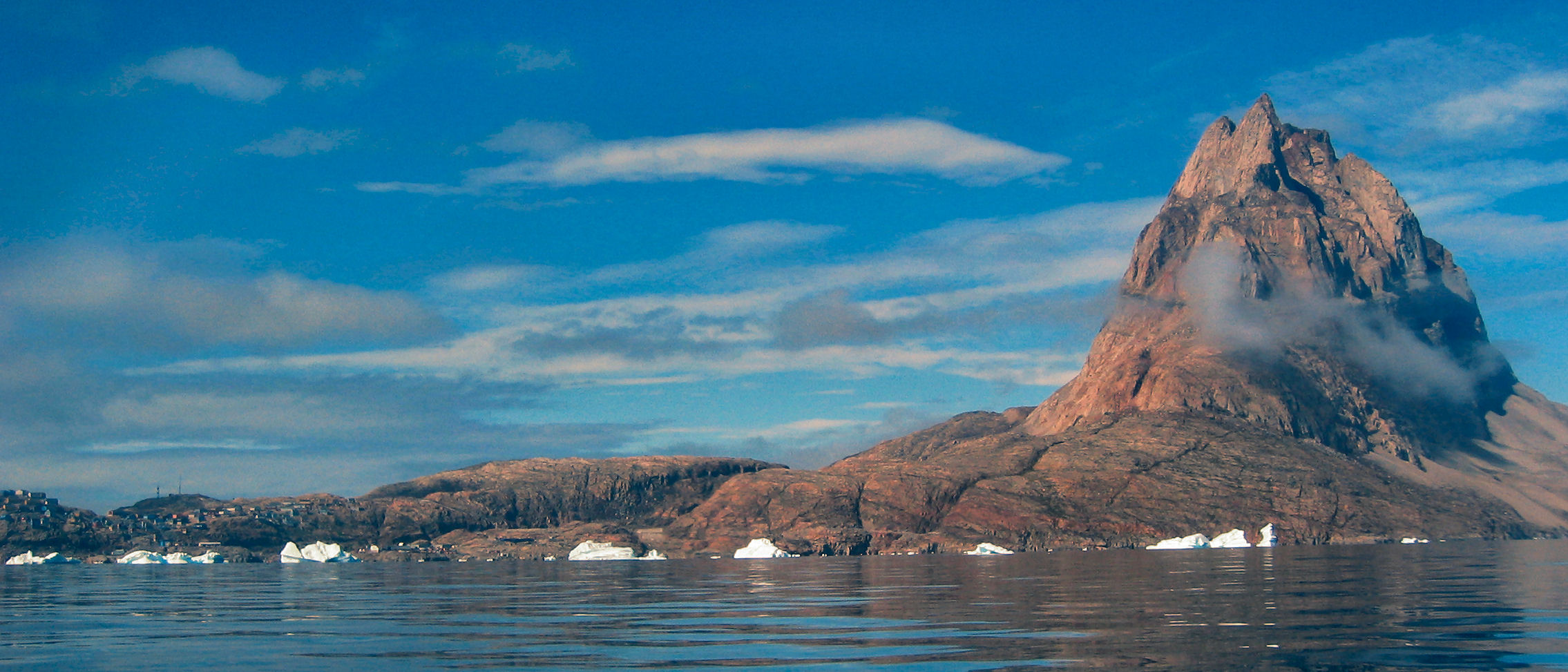
Uummannaq (far left) dwarfed by Uummannaq mountain

Uummannaq is located 590 kilometres north of the Arctic Circle on Uummannaq Island, located in the south-central arm of the Uummannaq Fjord. Uummannaq is also the general name given to the series of inlets north of the promontory at Niaqornat on the Nuussuaq Peninsula.

The island is also home to Uummannaq Mountain, rising very sharply to the height of 1170 m. Climbing it requires technical skills.

== Transport ==
Air Greenland operates helicopter services to Qaarsut Airport from Uummannaq Heliport. The neighbouring villages in the Uummannaq area are served by district cargo helicopters. In summer months, Royal Arctic Line operates its 'bygdeservice' with sailings by small ships to its neighbouring villages, including a service to Qaarsut.

== Culture ==
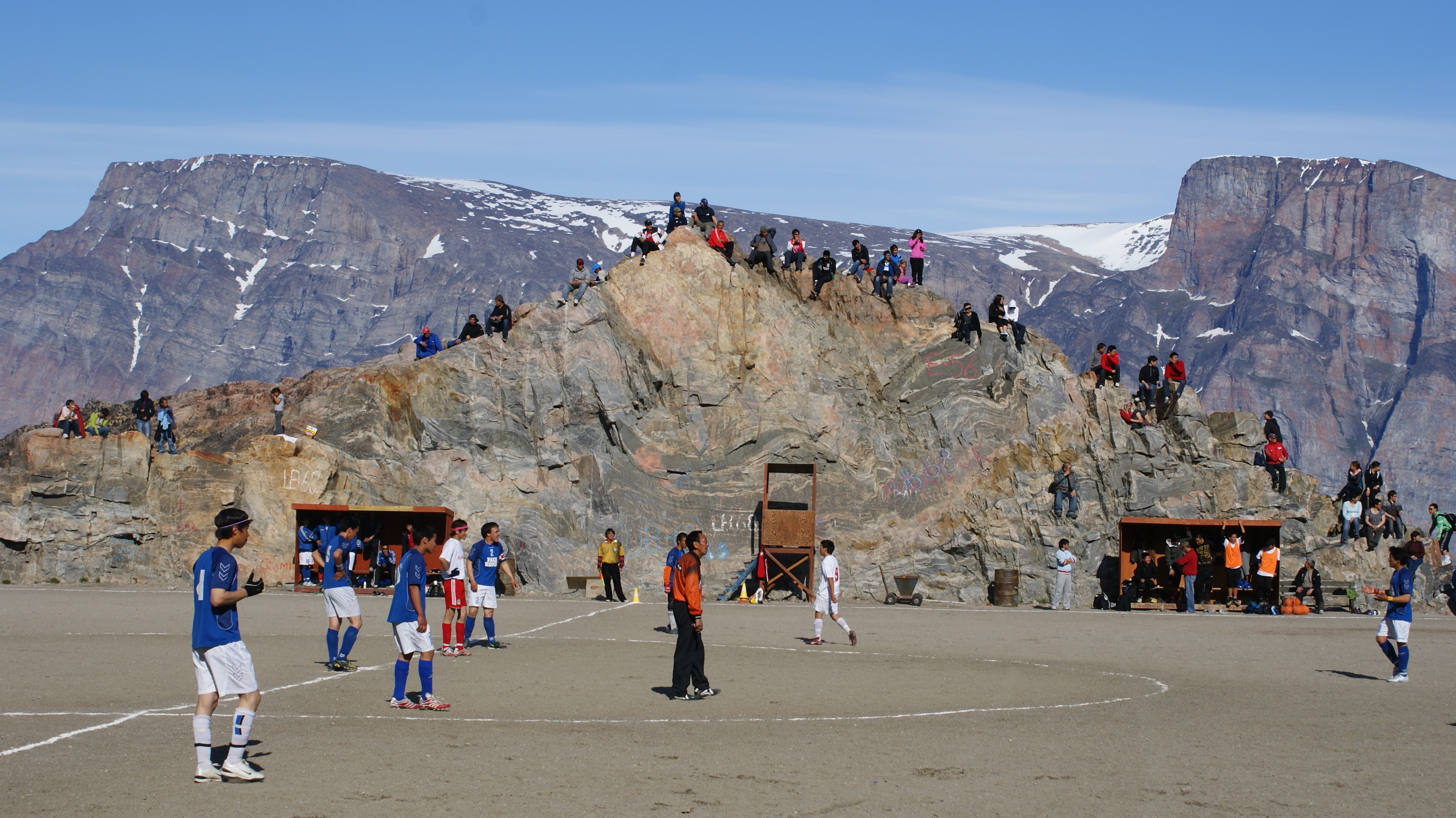
Football match in Uummannaq, Salliaruseq Island in the background

Danish and Greenlandic children are told that Santa Claus lives in Spraglebugten Bay in the west of the island. A turf hut (Santa's Castle) was built there for a Danish television programme and remains Santa's home in the popular imagination.

Scottish singer KT Tunstall's third album Tiger Suit features the track "Uummannaq Song", which was inspired by her trip to the town in September 2008 with Cape Farewell.

Uummannaq is home to Uummannaq Music – the world's northernmost music platform on sea ice.

== Climate ==
Uummannaq experiences a tundra climate (Köppen: ET); with short, quite cool summers and long, frigid winters. Due to the town's position within the large Uummannaq Fjord, the settlement is sheltered from the coastal winds by the high, glaciated mountains of the Nuussuaq Peninsula. Consequently, occasional strong foehn winds from the southeast can occur, raising the temperature above freezing even in winter. Moreover, this causes the area to be considered as the sunniest spot in Greenland. Climate data was collated from 2000 to 2020 at the nearby Qaarsut Airport, 25 km (16 mi) northwest of the town.

Climate data for Uummannaq (Qaarsut Airport) (70.73°N 52.68°W) (88 m (289 ft) AMSL) (2000-2020 data)
Month	Jan	Feb	Mar	Apr	May	Jun	Jul	Aug	Sep	Oct	Nov	Dec	Year
Record high °C (°F)	8.0 (46.4)	9.2 (48.6)	9.6 (49.3)	14.4 (57.9)	18.2 (64.8)	18.7 (65.7)	21.4 (70.5)	20.6 (69.1)	16.4 (61.5)	14.0 (57.2)	9.7 (49.5)	11.2 (52.2)	21.4 (70.5)
Mean daily maximum °C (°F)	−8.9 (16.0)	−11.2 (11.8)	−10.6 (12.9)	−4.7 (23.5)	2.7 (36.9)	9.0 (48.2)	12.2 (54.0)	10.6 (51.1)	4.8 (40.6)	−0.3 (31.5)	−4.4 (24.1)	−6.8 (19.8)	−0.6 (30.9)
Daily mean °C (°F)	−11.6 (11.1)	−14.3 (6.3)	−14.3 (6.3)	−8.6 (16.5)	−0.4 (31.3)	5.8 (42.4)	9.1 (48.4)	7.7 (45.9)	2.5 (36.5)	−2.5 (27.5)	−6.8 (19.8)	−9.1 (15.6)	−3.5 (25.7)
Mean daily minimum °C (°F)	−14.3 (6.3)	−17.4 (0.7)	−17.6 (0.3)	−12.4 (9.7)	−3.3 (26.1)	2.9 (37.2)	6.0 (42.8)	4.7 (40.5)	0.0 (32.0)	−4.8 (23.4)	−9.1 (15.6)	−11.6 (11.1)	−6.4 (20.5)
Record low °C (°F)	−30.3 (−22.5)	−31.9 (−25.4)	−33.9 (−29.0)	−27.7 (−17.9)	−16.2 (2.8)	−4.3 (24.3)	−1.1 (30.0)	−0.9 (30.4)	−9.6 (14.7)	−14.0 (6.8)	−18.8 (−1.8)	−27.4 (−17.3)	−33.9 (−29.0)
Average precipitation mm (inches)	16 (0.6)	16 (0.6)	17 (0.7)	17 (0.7)	16 (0.6)	22 (0.9)	28 (1.1)	28 (1.1)	36 (1.4)	28 (1.1)	33 (1.3)	25 (1.0)	280 (11.0)
Average precipitation days (≥ 0.1 mm)	10	9	10	10	8	7	8	9	11	11	14	12	118
Average relative humidity (%)	63.0	64.6	66.3	67.8	75.0	75.2	71.6	69.6	67.1	63.1	62.4	62.0	67.3
Source 1: Danish Meteorological Institute (1981-2020 data)
Source 2: Climates To Travel

== Population ==
Uummannaq is the second-largest town in the Avannaata municipality. It had 1,407 inhabitants in 2020, which was a decrease of more than 12% relative to the population in 2000.

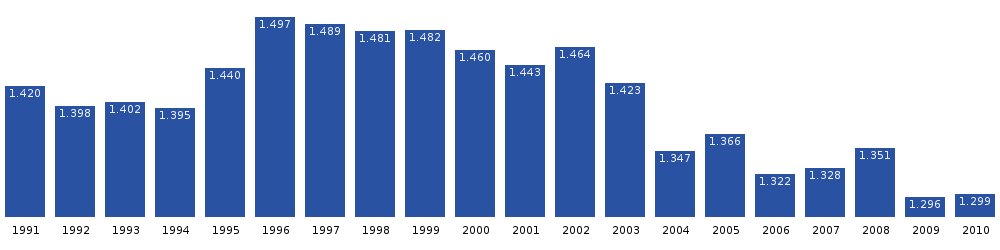
Uummannaq population growth dynamics, 1991-2010. Source: Statistics Greenland

== Notable people ==
- Ole Jørgen Hammeken, polar explorer
- Siissisoq, a Greenlandic rock band
- Nukaaka Coster-Waldau, actress, singer, former Miss Greenland and wife of Danish actor Nikolaj Coster-Waldau
- Aleqa Hammond, former prime minister of Greenland, and first female prime minister, grew up in Uummannaq
- Pipaluk Freuchen, children's writer
