= Uummannaq Island =

Small island in Avannaata municipality, Greenland

Uummannaq
Native name: Uummannap qeqertaa
- Location of Uummannaq Island
- Interactive map of Uummannaq

Geography
- Location: Uummannaq Fjord
- Coordinates: 70°42′11″N 52°08′00″W
- Area: 12 km^{2} (4.6 sq mi)
- Highest elevation: 1,170 m (3840 ft)
- Highest point: Uummannaq

Administration
- Greenland
- Municipality: Avannaata

Uummannaq Island (Greenlandic: Uummannap qeqertaa) is a small (12 km^{2} (4.6 sq mi)) island in Avannaata municipality in northwestern Greenland. Located in the south-central part of the Uummannaq Fjord, it is home to the most prominent mountain on the Arctic coast of western Greenland and to Uummannaq, the largest town north of Ilulissat.

The island is separated from Nuussuaq Peninsula in the southwest by Sarqarput Strait in the southern arm of Uummannaq Fjord. In the east, the island is separated from the Salliaruseq Island by the wide Assorput Strait. To the north, the central arm of Uummannaq Fjord separates it from the large Appat Island and the skerries of Saattut.

== Map of the island ==
Geography of Uummannaq Island, with the settled area marked with a hatch. North is to the left.

== Coast ==
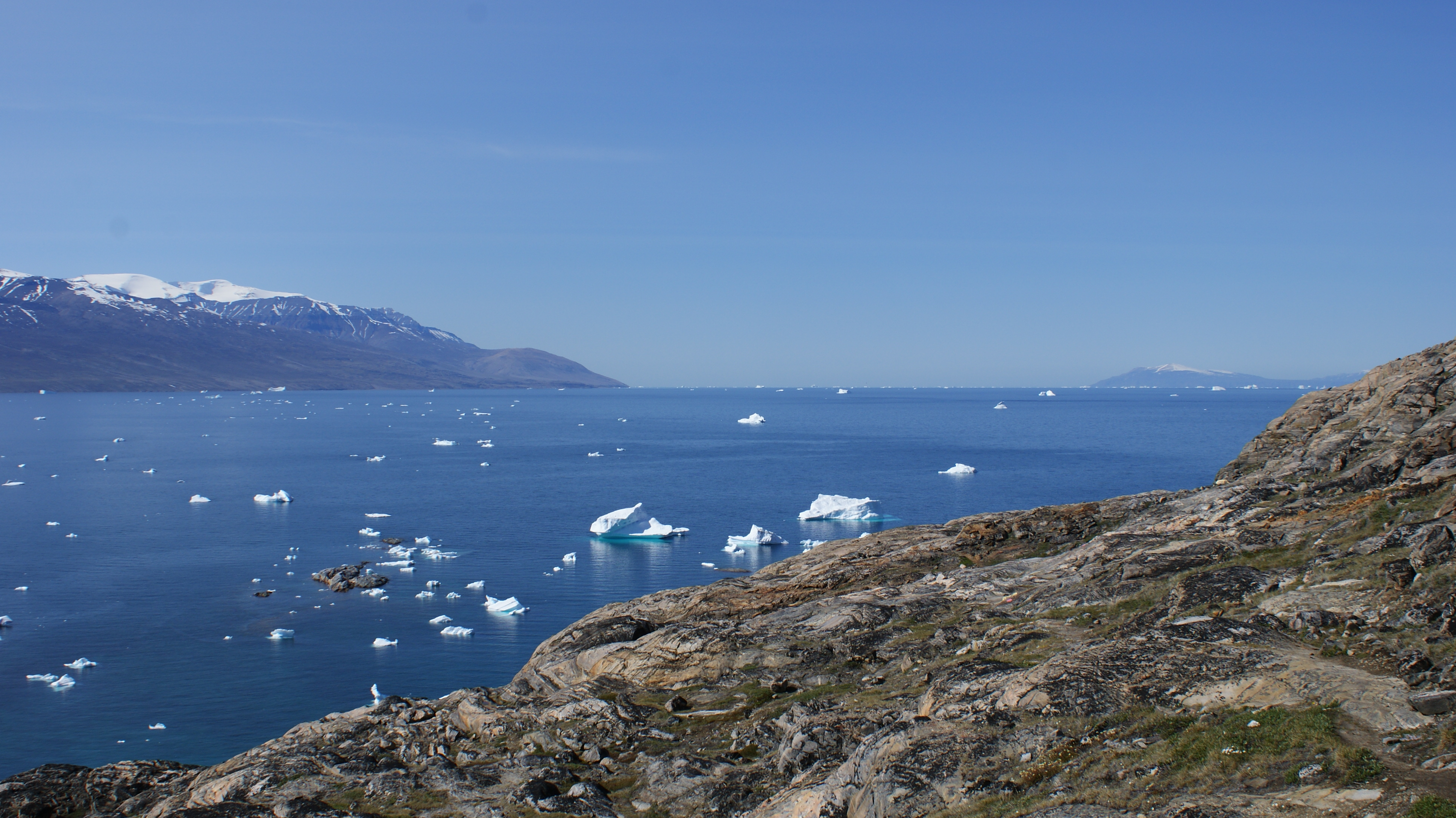
View over Qasigissat Bay towards Nuussuaq Peninsula, the main arm of Uummannaq Fjord, and Illorsuit Island

The island has a very undeveloped coast, with a handful of small, rocky bays primarily in the southernmost, inhabited part. The only significant bay is Qasigissat (Danish: Spraglebugten) on the southwestern shore. The weakly indented Iterlak bay is located on the northwestern coast of the island. The sea is the only means of transport to the uninhabited northern part of the island.

=== Harbours ===
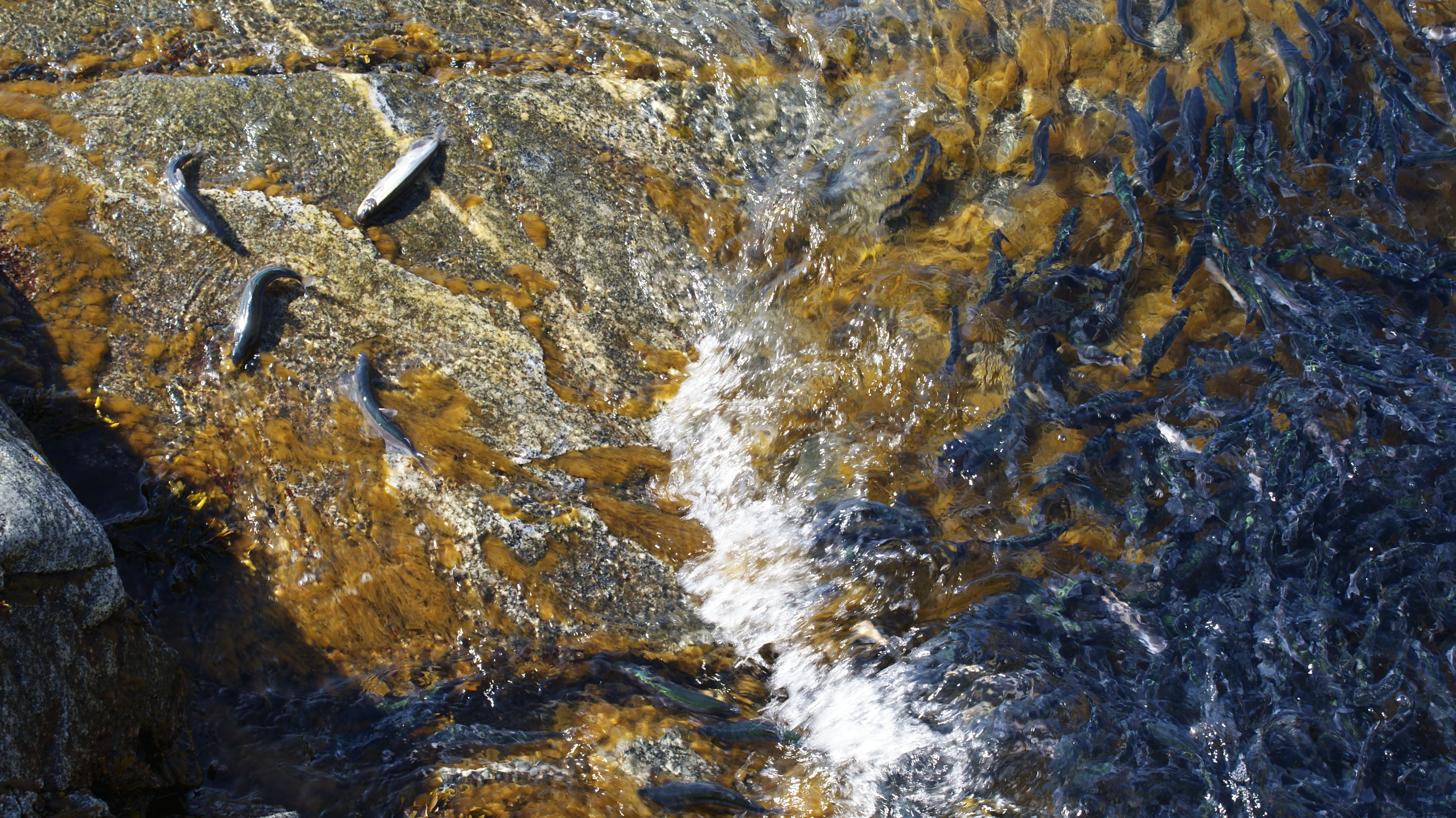
Fish school migration in Qasigissat Bay

The Uummannaq port occupies a small inlet in the southeastern end of the island. It is not deep enough to service large cruise ships, but sufficiently deep to handle supply and fishing ships of Royal Arctic Line and Royal Greenland, as well as motorboats and lesser fishing boats. There are several small bays between the port and Nuussuatsiaq promontory, in the vicinity of the heliport.

Fishermen of Uummannaq town peruse the entire southern coast for anchorage of smaller fishing boats and motorboats. Outside the urbanized part of the island there are several inlets and coves providing protection for fishing nets and, in the summer, dogsleds. During summertime, a small and otherwise economically uninteresting skerry in Qasigissat Bay is used as an observation point for marine life, particularly fish schools migrating alongside the coast.

== Promontories ==
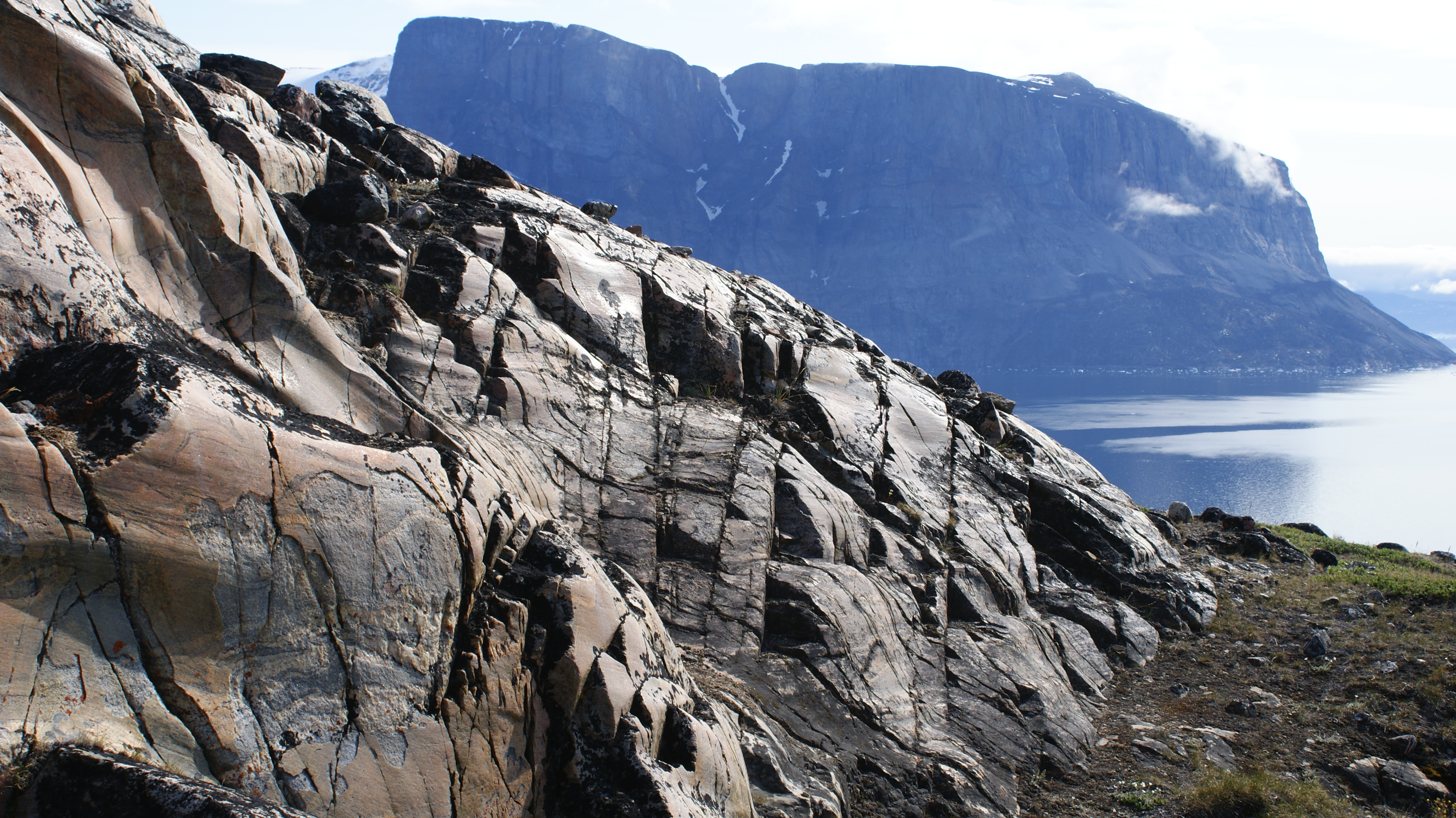
Folded gneiss rock above the Nuussuatsiaq promontory, overlooking Salliaruseq Island across Assorput Strait

Name	Direction	Location	Notes
Uitlut	Western Cape	70°42′51″N 52°11′31″W	
Tuunerit	Northern Cape	70°44′00″N 52°09′05″W	
Nuussuatsiaq	Eastern Cape	70°41′33″N 52°05′52″W	
(none)	Southern Cape	70°40′19″N 52°07′40″W	The southern part of the island is urbanized, with the rocky southern cape overlooked by the houses dotting the entire southern coast

== Lakes ==
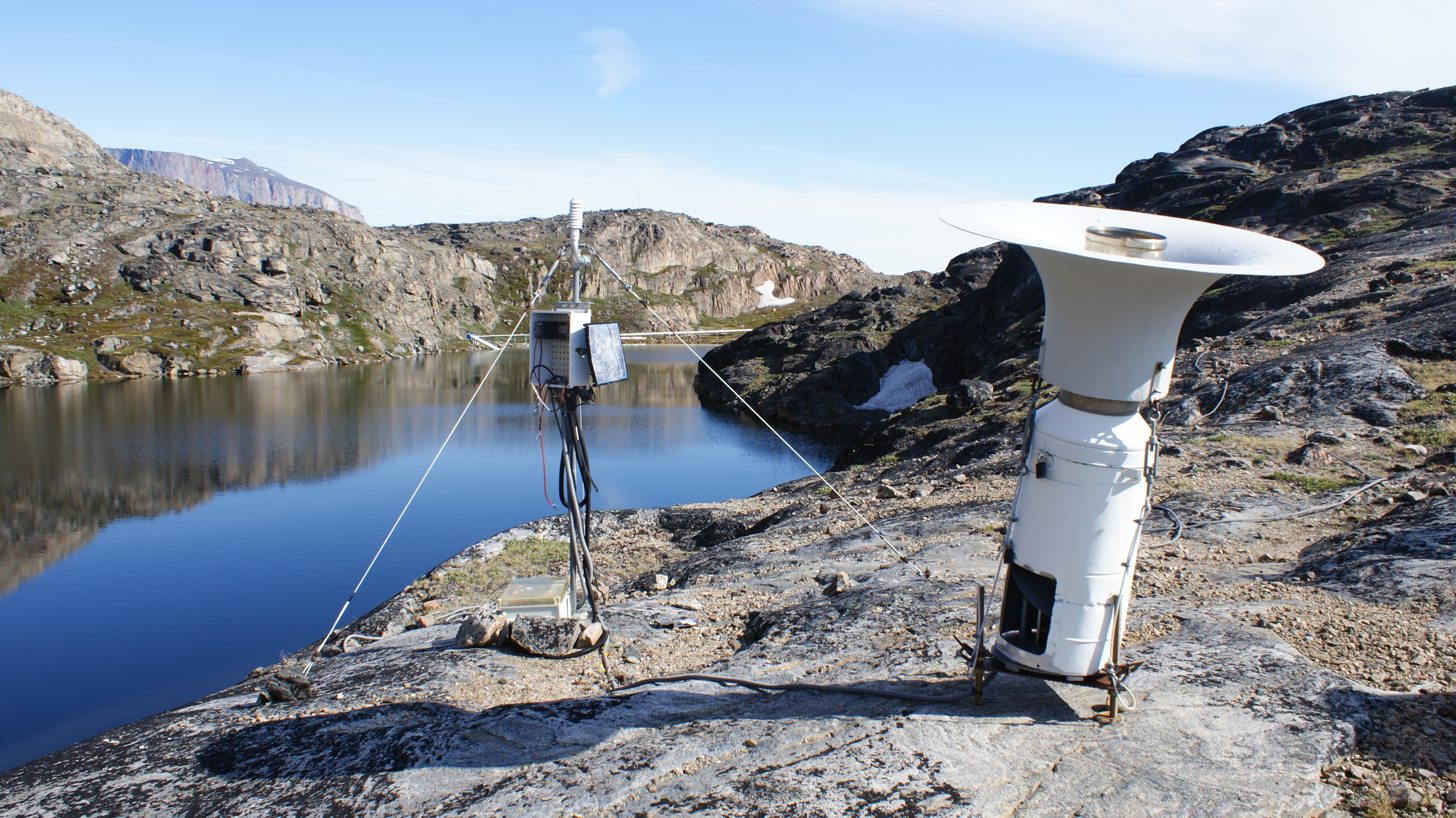
Meteorological equipment at Blue Lake, including an automated snow gauge − temporarily out of order

There are two significant lakes on the island: Tasersuaq lake, and the Blue Lake. There are also several tiny ponds on the plateau, south of Uummannaq Mountain.

=== Blue Lake ===
The Blue Lake is located in a depression of the south-central plateau, at approximately 70°41′34″N 52°07′25″W, to the north of the football pitch. Pipes laid on the ground carry potable water from the lake to the central waterworks installation.

=== Tasersuaq ===
Tasersuaq (Greenlandic for large lake) is the largest lake situated in the southern part of the island, at approximately 70°40′50″N 52°08′00″W. It is surrounded by small hills from the west and south, and by taller cliffs of the plateau from the east and north. The northernmost houses in Uummannaq are located due west of the lake. Tasersuaq is the main water reservoir serving Uummannaq town, with pipe waterworks leading southwards through a deep gully.

== Interior ==
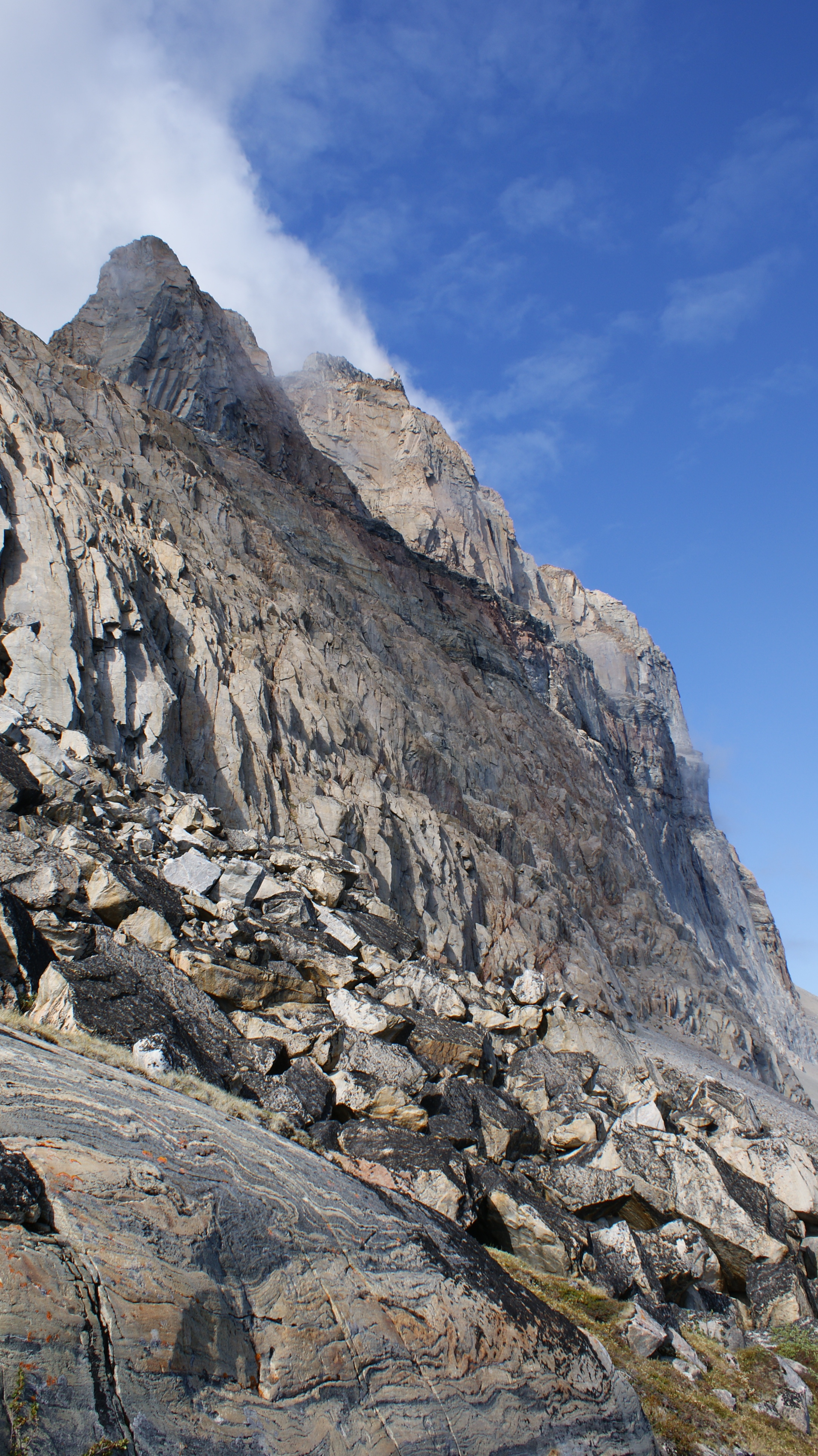
Uummannaq Mountain: eastern wall in profile

The entire island is rocky, with the southern half progressively rising in altitude in the northern direction, towards the Uummannaq Twin Peaks mountain. The area south of the geographical center of the island is a plateau of folded granite hills, dotted with tiny ponds. The plateau falls into the surrounding waters with steep cliffs crevassed with couloirs. The northeastern coast under the walls of the mountain features a large cone of loose scree. Movement on the outskirts of the interior is restricted to mountaineering.

=== Uummannaq Mountain ===
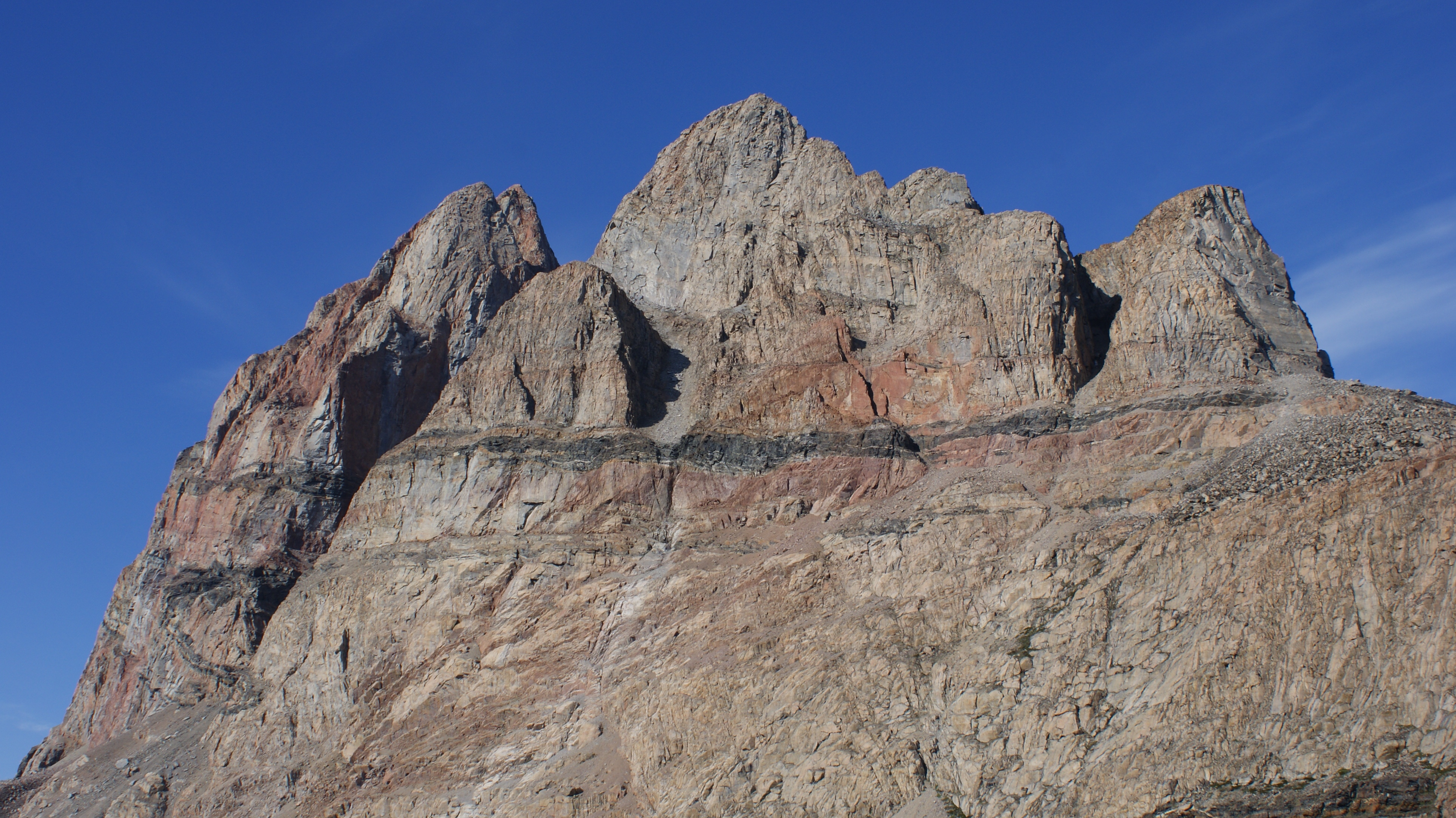
Uummannaq Twin Peaks tower over the island

Uummannaq Mountain entirely dominates the landscape of the island, its base occupying its entire northern half. Formed of granite and basement gneiss, it is the most prominent mountain in the Arctic part of the west coast of Greenland. The mountain is a landmark of Greenland and a tourist magnet, often reproduced in art.

The mountain has two summits of similar height (the eastern summit being the higher), hence the name Uummannaq, Greenlandic for heart-shaped. Deep chimneys fall to the south and the north from the col between the western and eastern summits. Its eastern wall has no significant depressions, falling in a uniform cliff into Assorput Strait between Uummannaq Island and Salliaruseq Island.

== Settlement ==
The only settlement on the island is Uummannaq town, one of the cultural centers of northwestern Greenland. The town occupies approximately 10% of the island area, concentrated around the southern tip of the island.

== Transport ==
=== Air ===
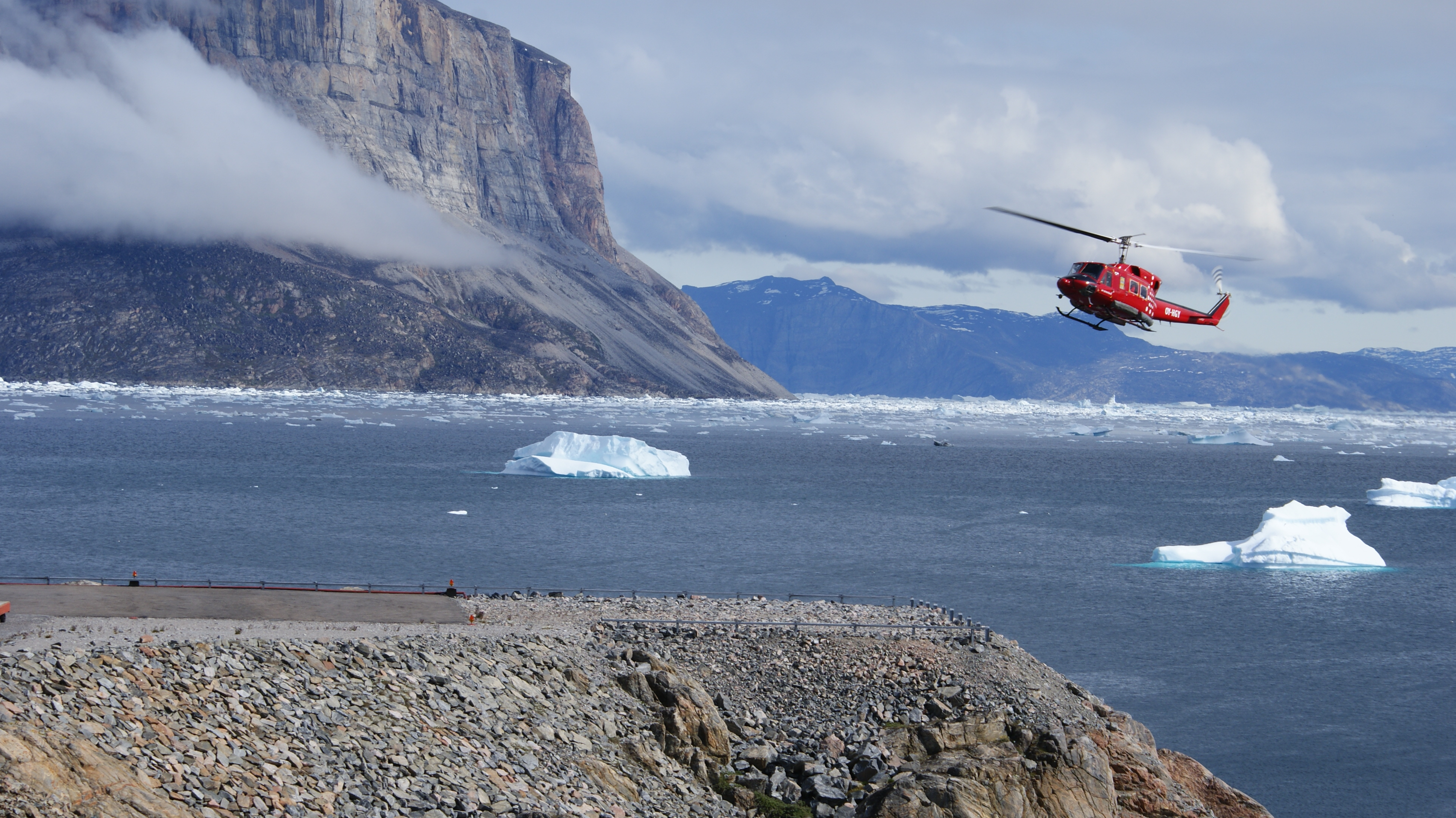
Air Greenland links the island with the rest of the country via Uummannaq Heliport

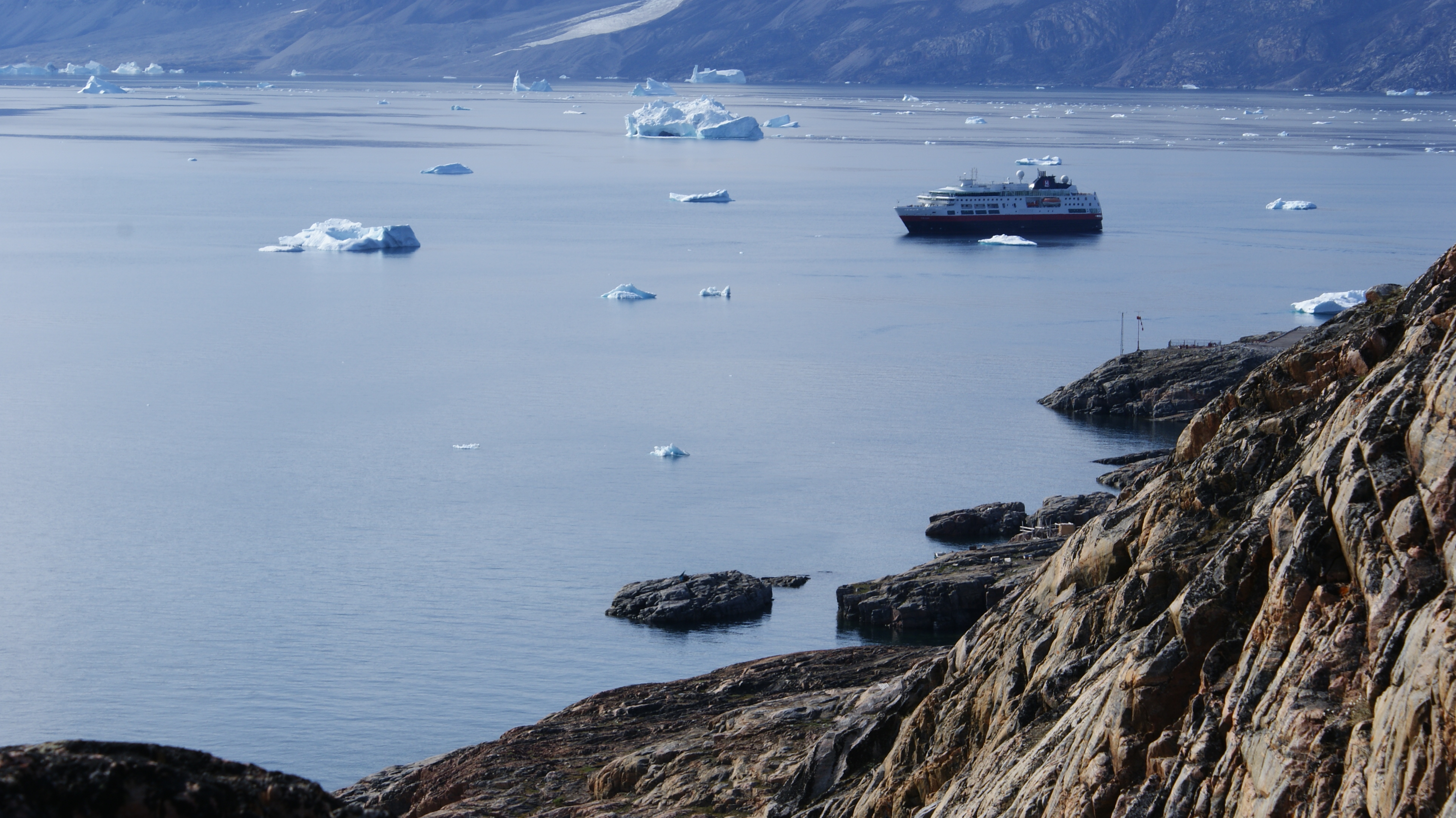
M/S Fram of Hurtigruten cannot be serviced directly by Uummannaq port due to the shallowness of the port inlet

The island is well connected with the rest of Greenland. Air Greenland has its regional helicopter hub on the island, serving all settlements in the region. Several daily helicopter flights link the island with the nearby Qaarsut Airport on Nuussuaq Peninsula, from where STOL connections are available to Upernavik, Sisimiut, Ilulissat and further to central and southern Greenland.

=== Sea ===
Until 2006, Arctic Umiaq Line had provided ferry services from Nuuk to Upernavik, calling at Uummannaq, Ilulissat, and Aasiaat within what was then Qaasuitsup municipality. M/S Sarpik Ittuk−which serviced Disko Bay, Uummannaq Fjord and the Upernavik Archipelago−was sold in 2006 to Nova Cruising, a company from The Bahamas. Since then the ferry services of AUL are available only southwards from Ilulissat, operated with the remaining ship, M/S Sarfaq Ittuk.

The cargo/passenger boat Pajuttaat of Royal Arctic Line links Uummannaq with Upernavik. Individual transport and sightseeing boats can be chartered from the Uummannaq Tourist Service. The island is often visited by cruise ships, such as Norway's Hurtigruten.

== Photographs ==
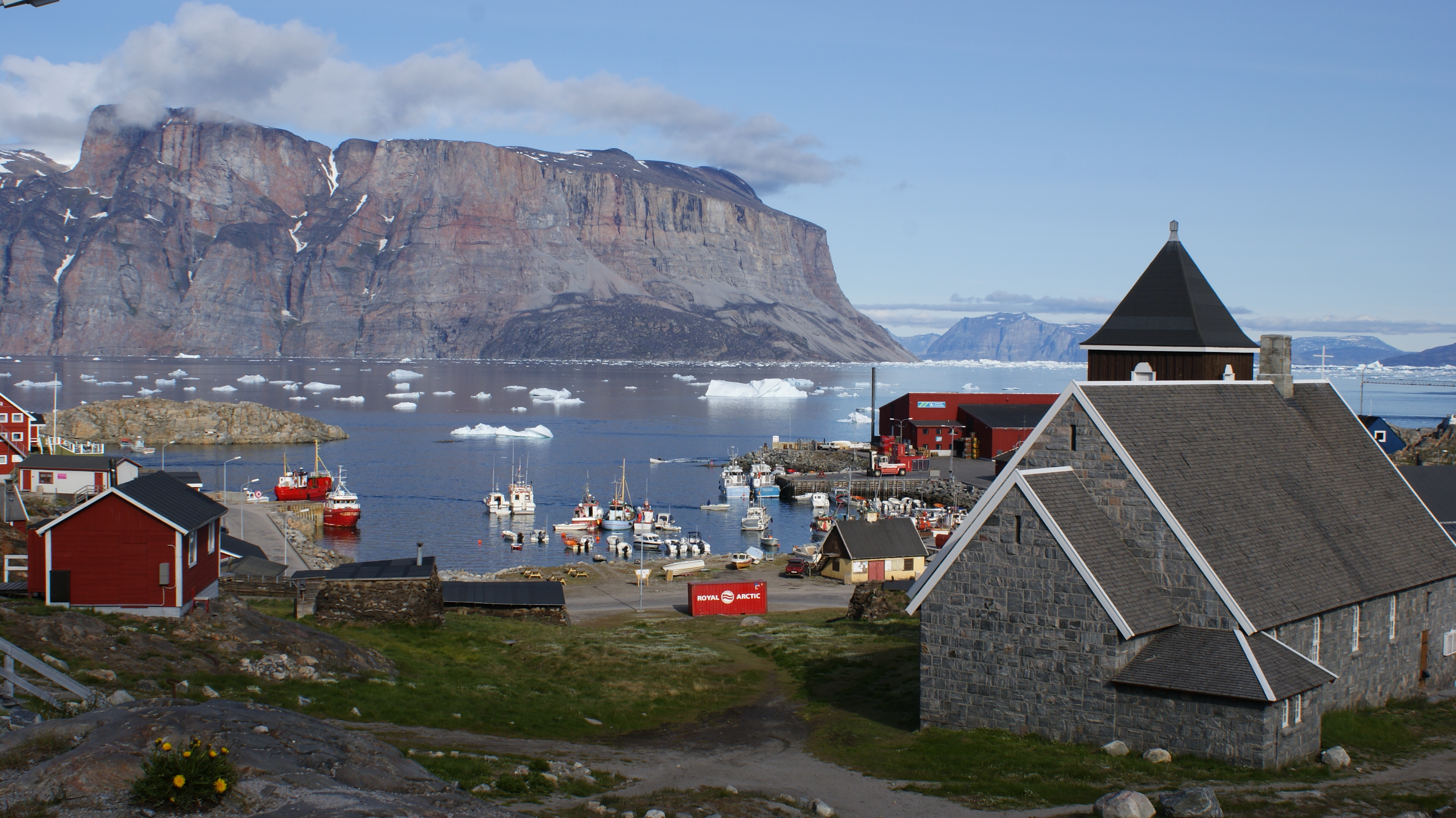
The port in Uummannaq town

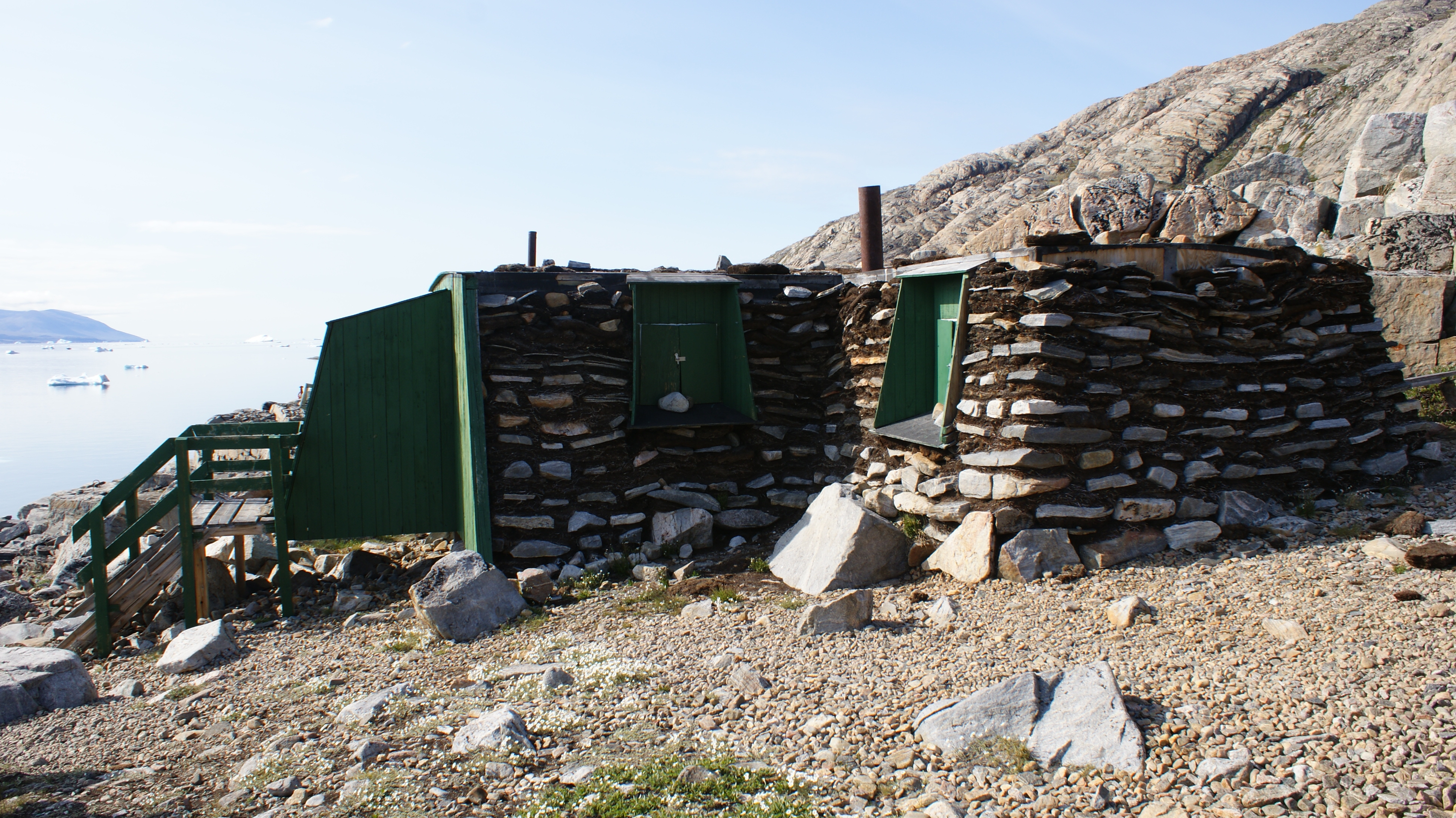
A restored traditional Greenlandic turf house serving the children of Denmark as the 'Santa Claus Castle', where they can write letters.

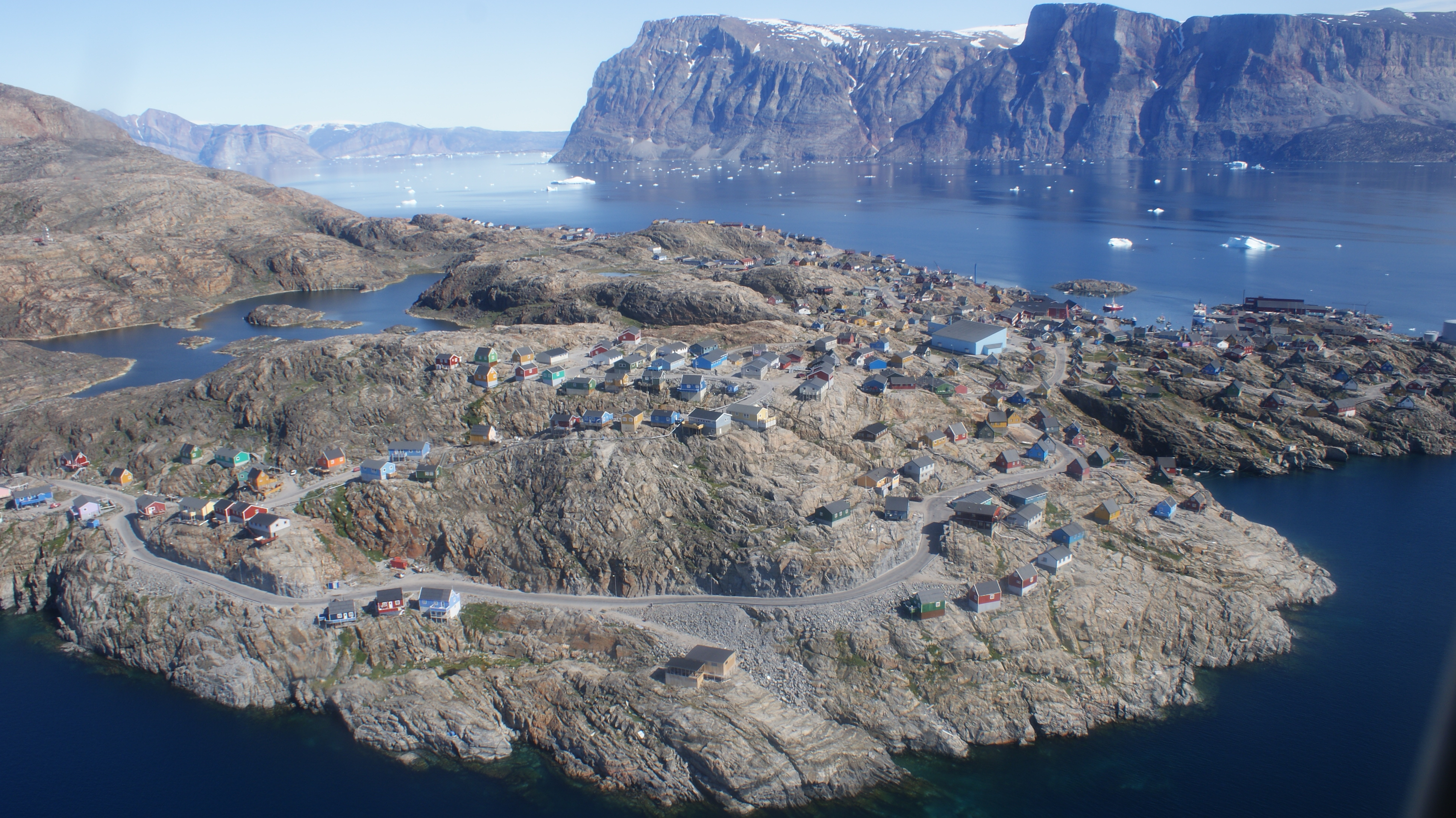
Aerial view of the southern part of Uummannaq Island from the Air Greenland Bell 212 helicopter during the Uummannaq-Qaarsut flight

== See also ==
- List of islands of Greenland
