= Assorput Strait =

Coordinates: 70°42′N 52°01′W

Location of Assorput Strait within the Uummannaq Fjord region

Assorput Strait (old spelling: Agssorput) is a strait in the Uummannaq Fjord system in northwestern Greenland. It separates Uummannaq Island in the west from Salliaruseq Island in the east. The strait waterway connects inner Sarqarput Strait in the southern arm of Uummannaq Fjord in the south with the central arm of Uummannaq Fjord in the north.

== Transport ==
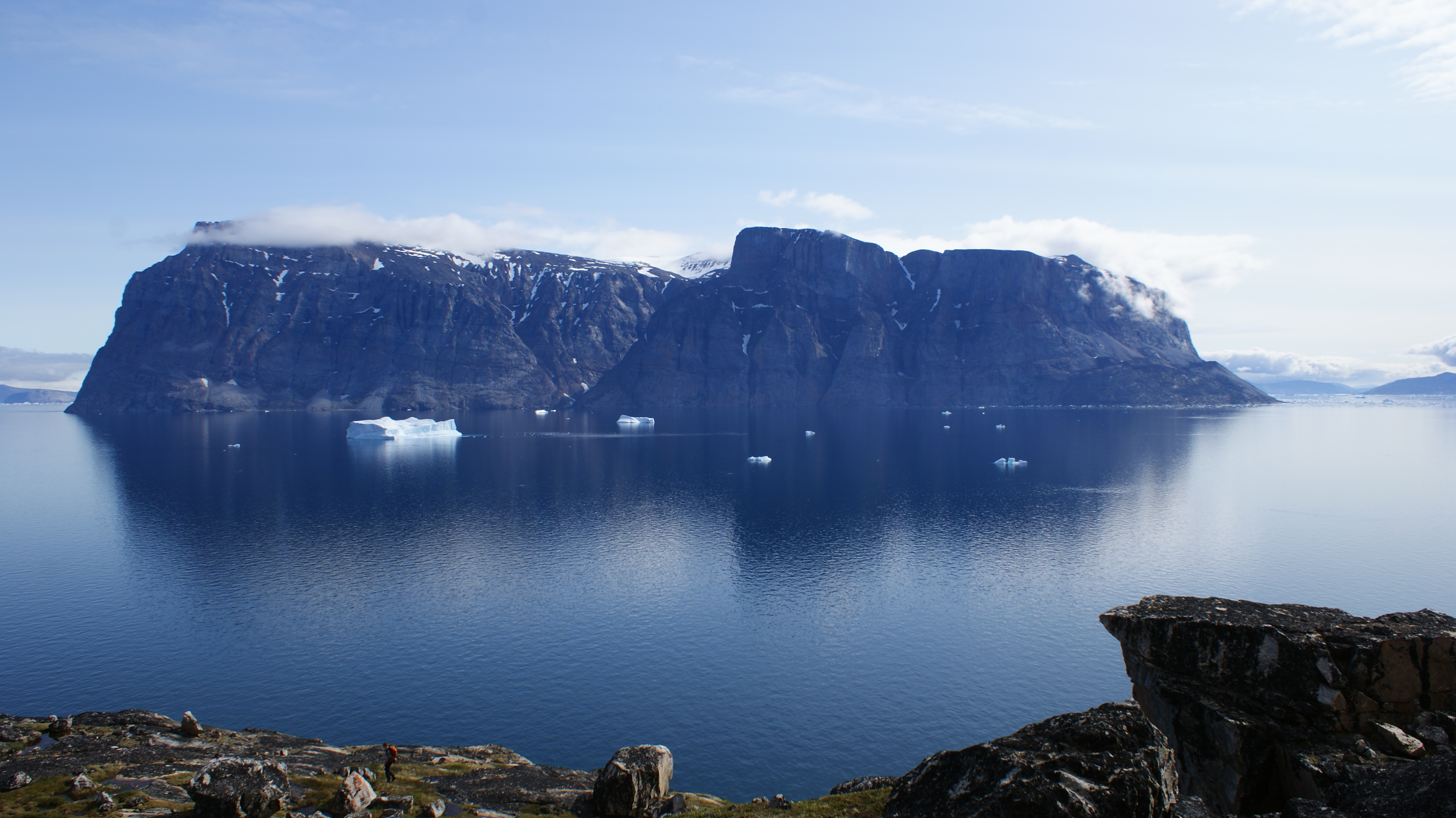
Assorput Strait and Salliaruseq Island from the west

=== Air ===
On the way from Qaarsut Airport on Nuussuaq Peninsula, the helicopters of Air Greenland approach the Uummannaq Heliport – located on the western shore of the strait – alongside the western wall of Salliaruseq, first converging to the island, to then turn 90 degrees to the west due to winds in the Assorput Strait.

=== Sea ===
The Uummannaq port occupies a small inlet of Assorput Strait in the southeastern end of the Uummannaq Island. It is not deep enough to service large cruise ships, but sufficiently deep to handle supply and fishing ships of Royal Arctic Line and Royal Greenland, as well as motorboats and lesser fishing boats. There are several small bays between the port and Nuussuatsiaq promontory, in the vicinity of the heliport.

== Photographs ==
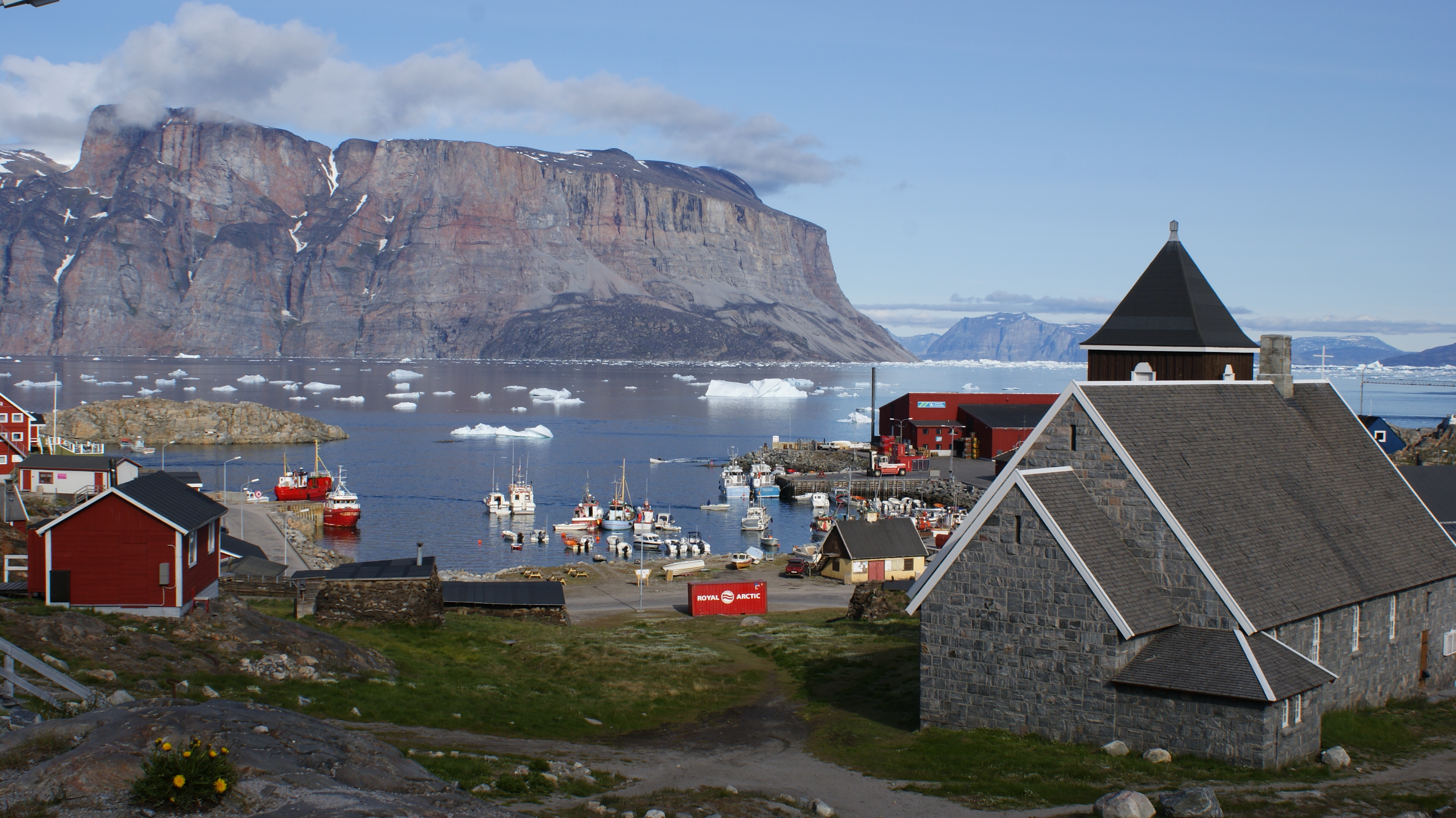
The port in Uummannaq town

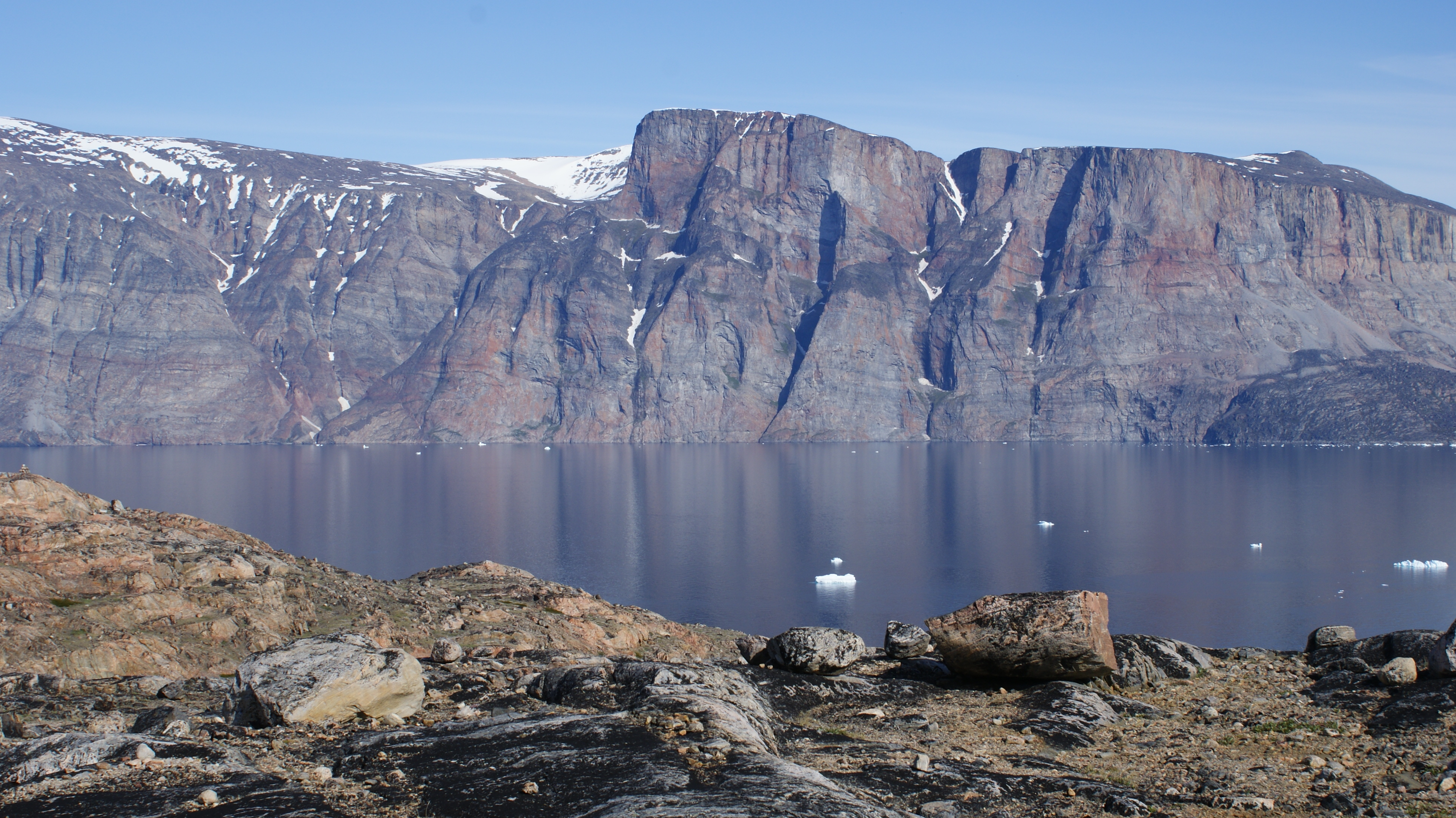
Salliaruseq Island and Assorput Strait

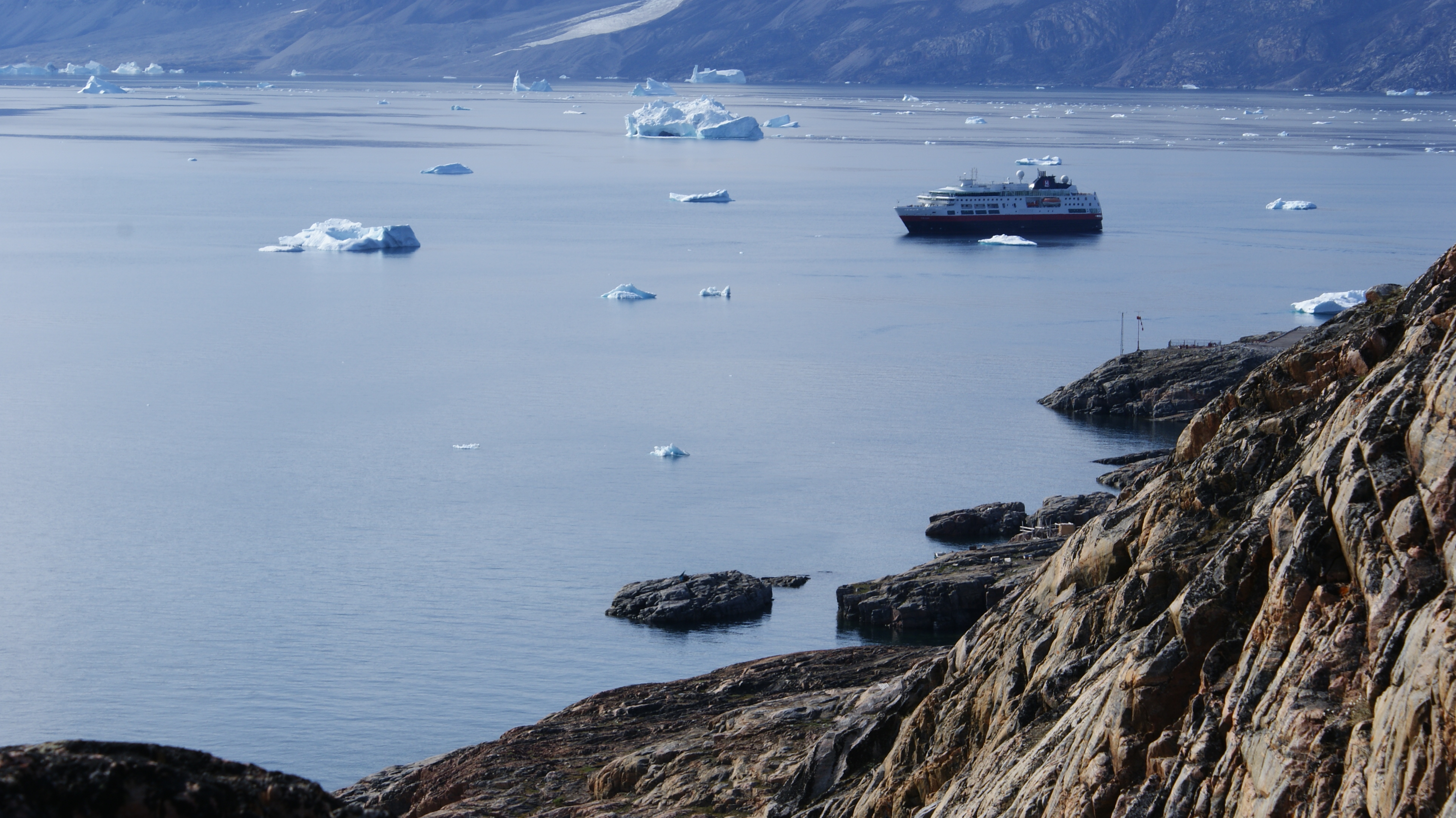
MS Fram of Hurtigruten cannot be serviced directly by Uummannaq port due to the shallowness of the port inlet

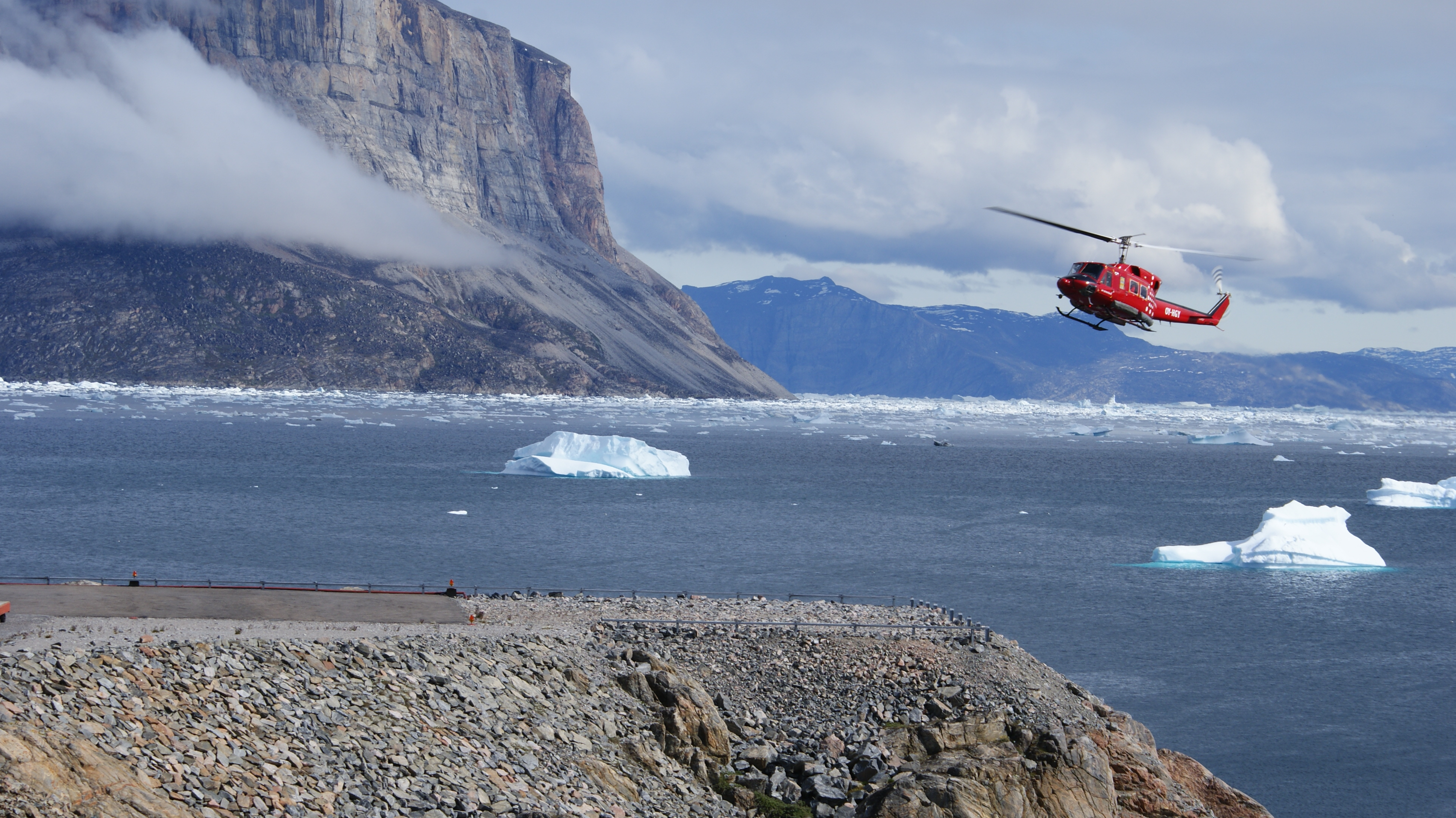
Air Greenland Bell 212 approaches Uummannaq Heliport over Assorput Strait
