= Uummannaq (disambiguation) =

Uummannaq may refer to the following areas in Greenland, from north to south:

- Murchison Sound (Greenlandic: Uummannaq)
- Uummannaq, an Inuit settlement near the former settlement of Dundas (both today abandoned), near Thule Air Base
- Sugar Loaf Island (Greenlandic: Uummannaq), an island in the northern part of Upernavik Archipelago in northwestern Greenland
- Uummannaq Fjord, a large fjord in northwestern Greenland
- Uummannaq Island, an island in the above fjord
- Uummannaq (mountain), a mountain on Uummannaq Island
- Uummannaq, a town on Uummannaq Island
- Umanak (mission), a Moravian mission up-fjord from Nuuk in mid-western Greenland
