= Uummannaq (mountain) =

Mountain in Greenland

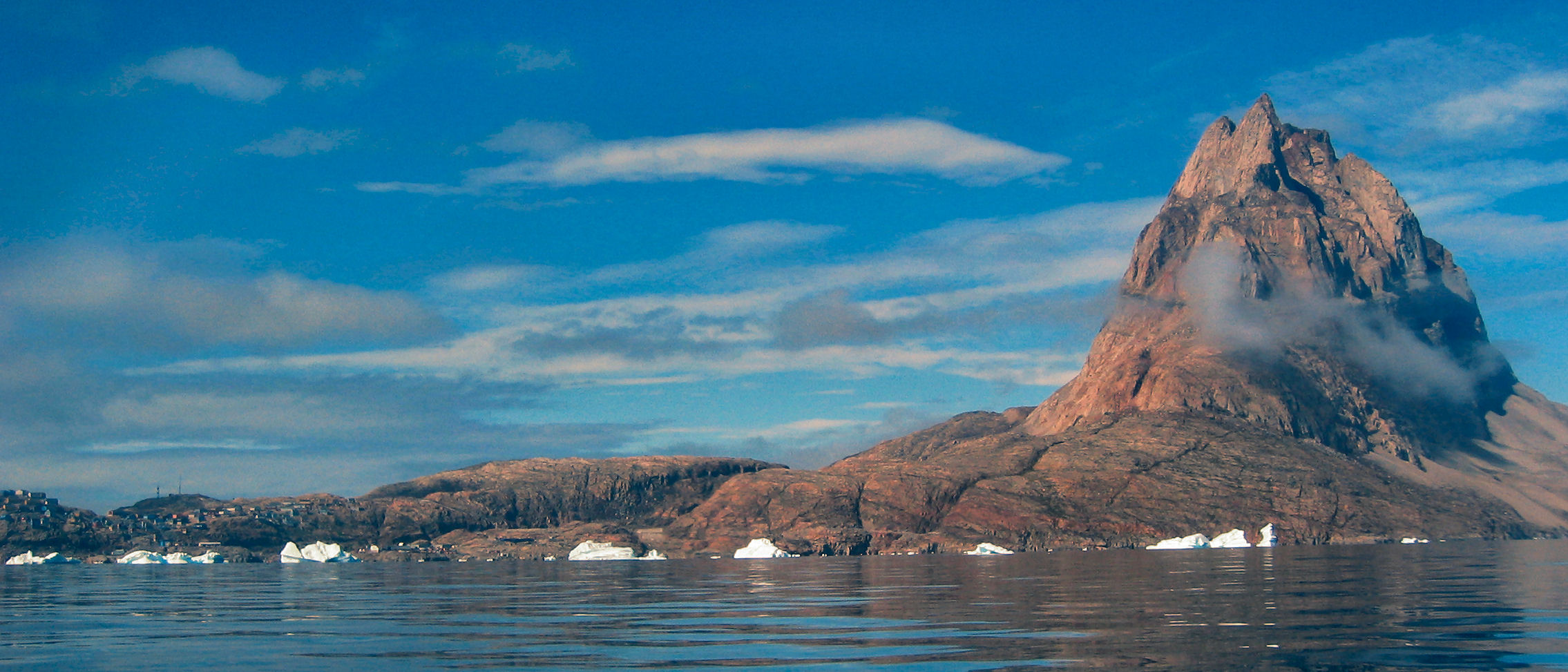
- Overview from Uummannaq Fjord

Highest point
- Elevation: 1,170 m (3,840 ft)
- Prominence: 1,170 m (3,840 ft)
- Coordinates: 70°42′47″N 52°07′52″W

Geography
- Location within Greenland
- Location: Uummannaq, Greenland

Uummannaq is a 1,170-metre-high (3,839 ft), prominent, isolated mountain in western Greenland, located on the small Uummannaq Island in the central part of the Uummannaq Fjord. It entirely dominates the landscape of the island, its base occupying its entire northern half. Formed of granite and basement gneiss, it is the most prominent mountain in the Arctic part of the west coast of Greenland. The mountain is a landmark of Greenland and a tourist magnet, often reproduced in art.

== Topography ==
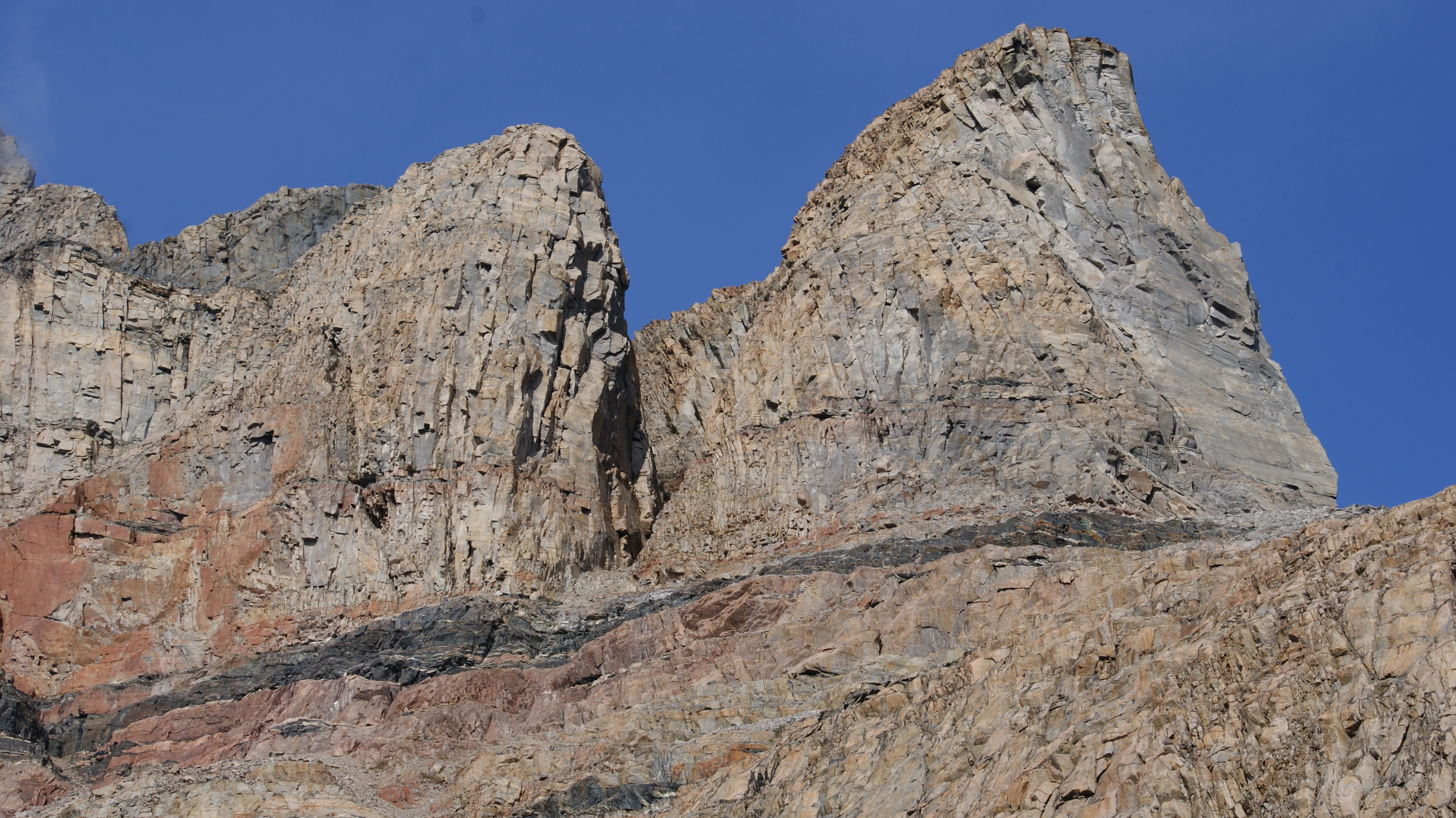
Trabant bastions in the southeastern pillar.

The mountain has two summits of similar height (the eastern summit being the higher), hence the name Uummannaq, Greenlandic for heart-shaped. Deep chimneys fall to the south and the north from the col between the western and eastern summits.

Its eastern wall has no significant depressions, falling in a uniform cliff into Assorput Strait between Uummannaq Island and Salliaruseq Island.

There are several trabant bastions in the southeastern pillar, to the northeast of the black bands in the southern wall.

== Ascent ==
Due to its remote location and considerable difficulty, few mountaineers have attempted the ascent. Only two known ascents had been done before 1992.

== Photographs ==
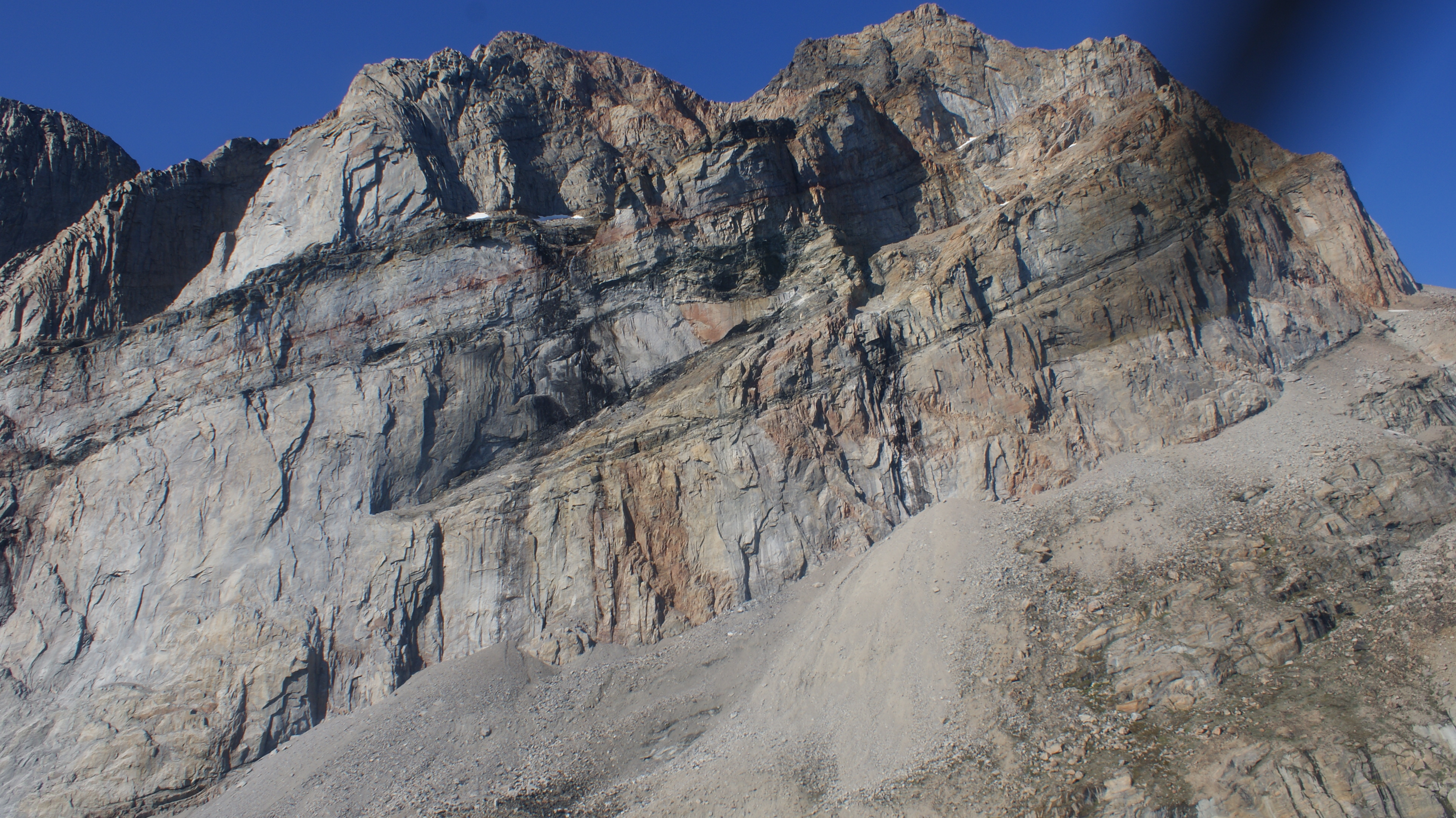
Eastern wall, aerial view from Air Greenland Bell 212 helicopter.

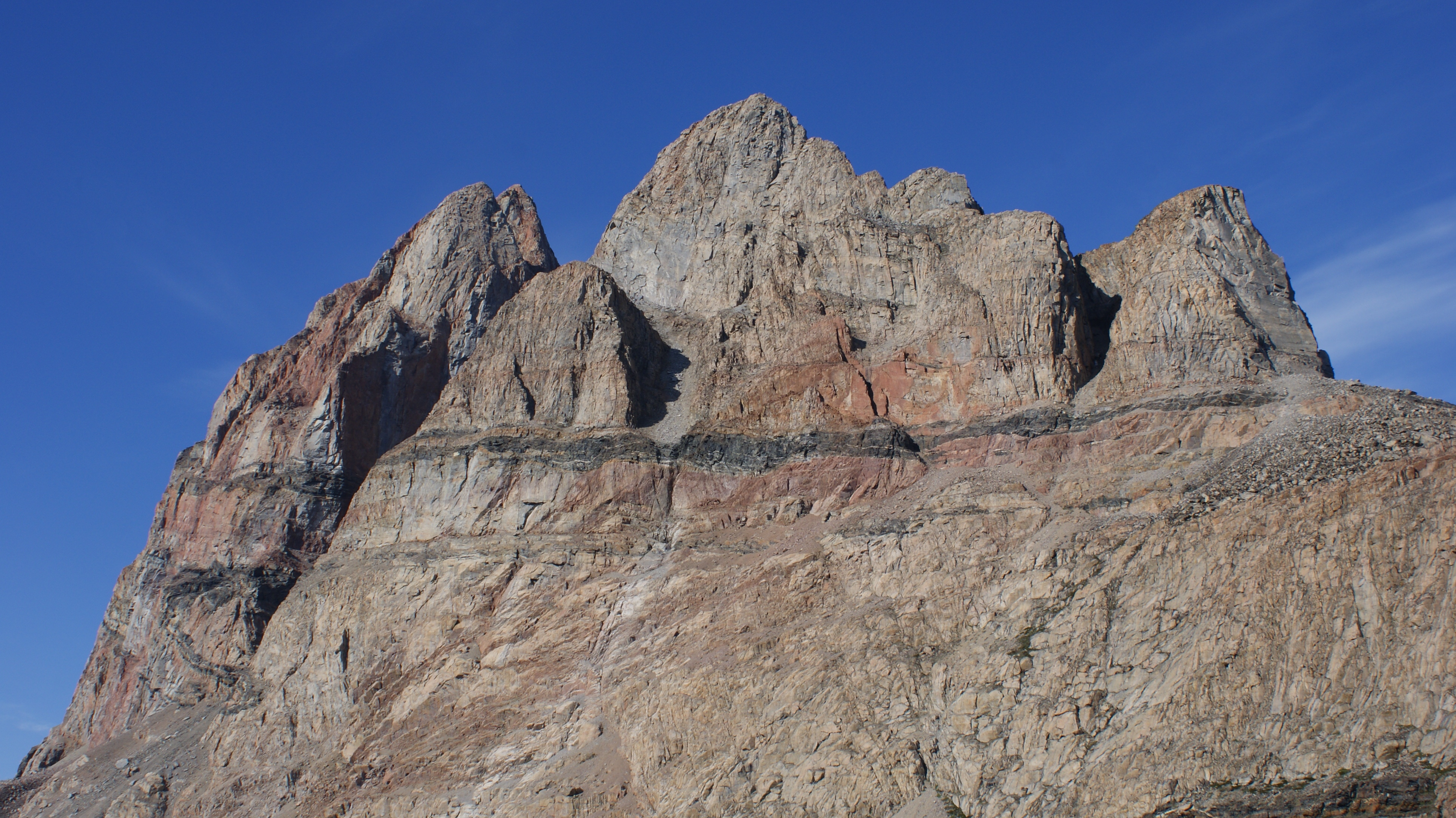
Southern wall.

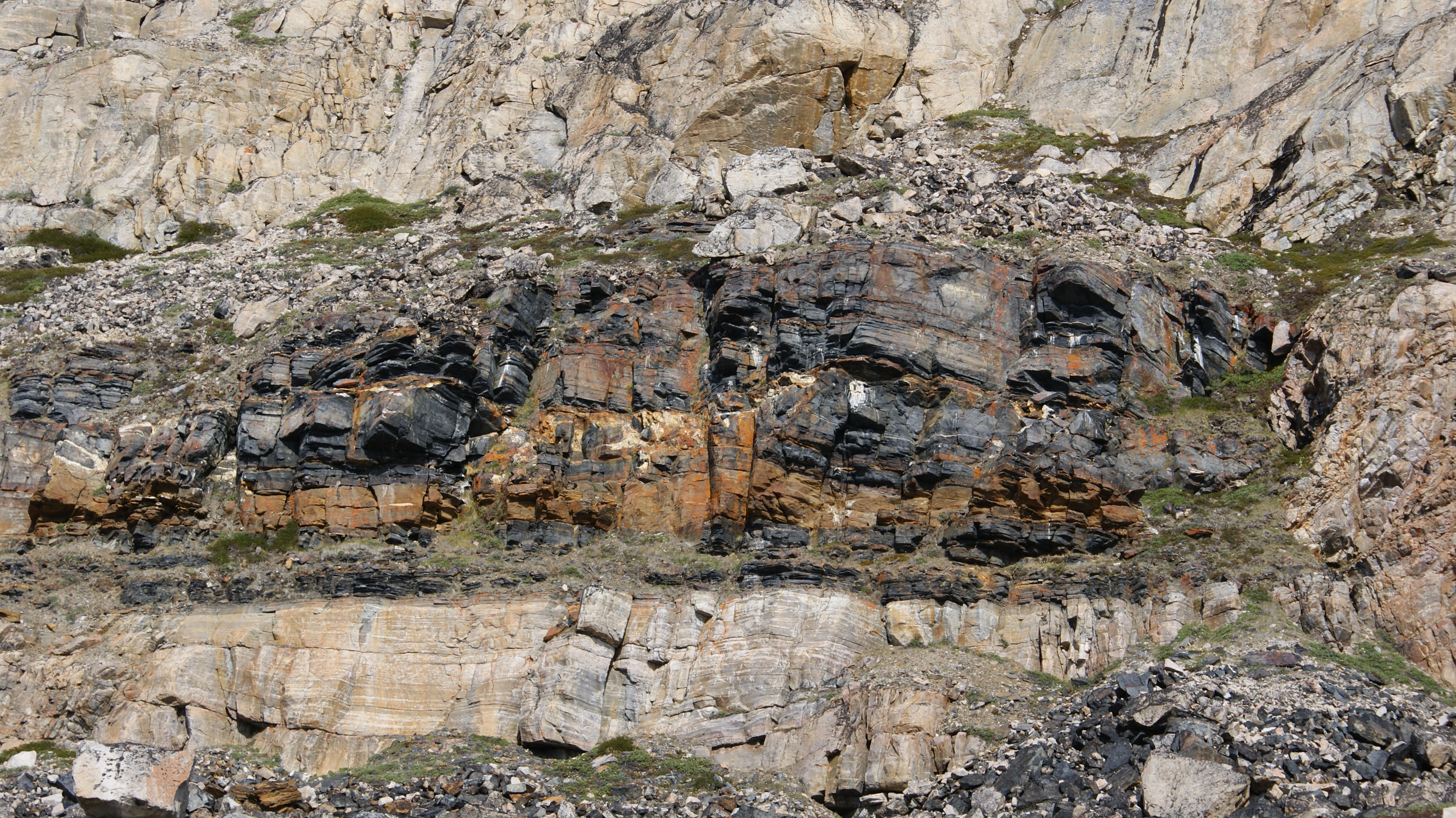
Black bands of gneiss in the southern wall.

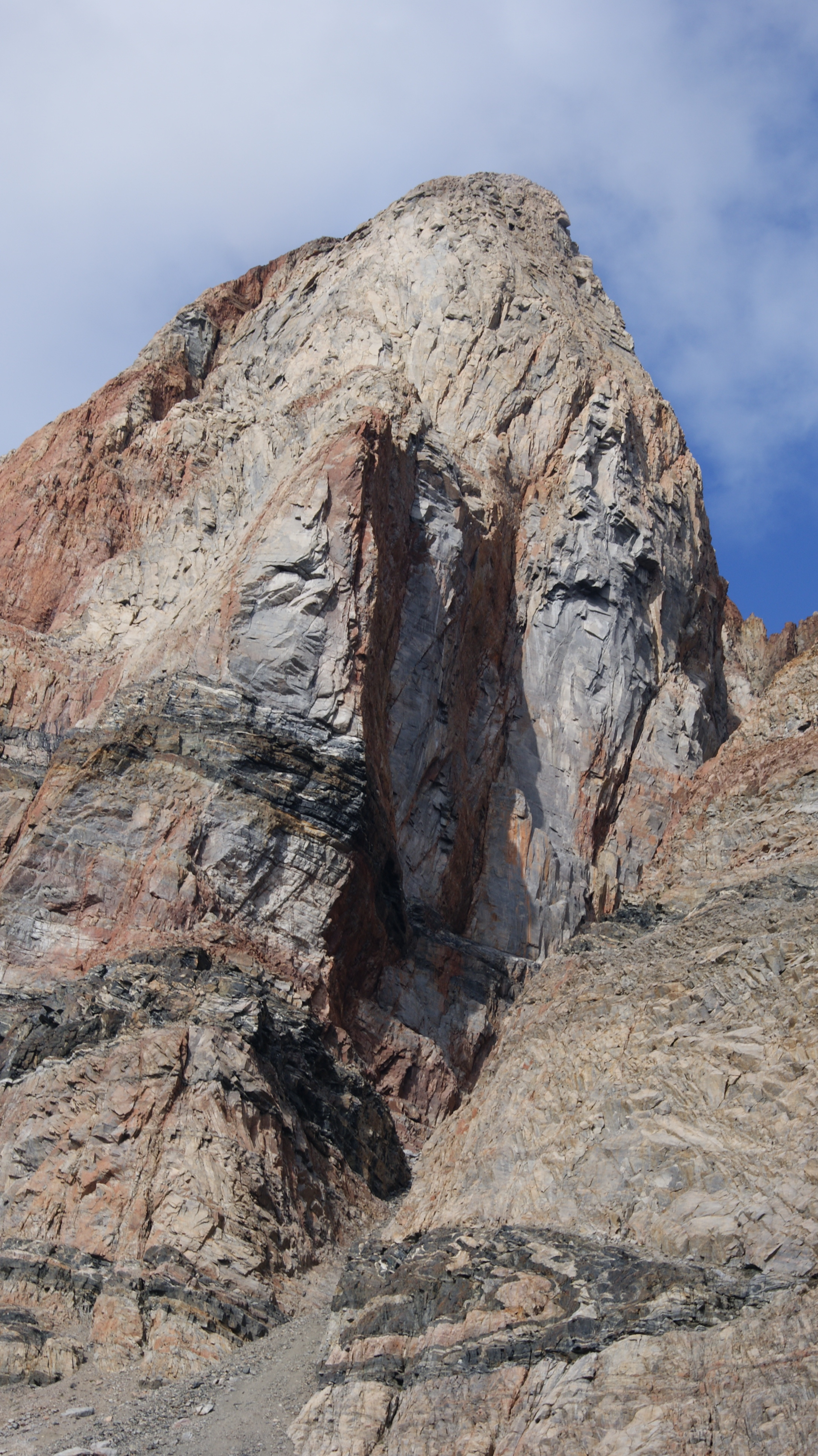
Uummannaq, western summit, southern pillar

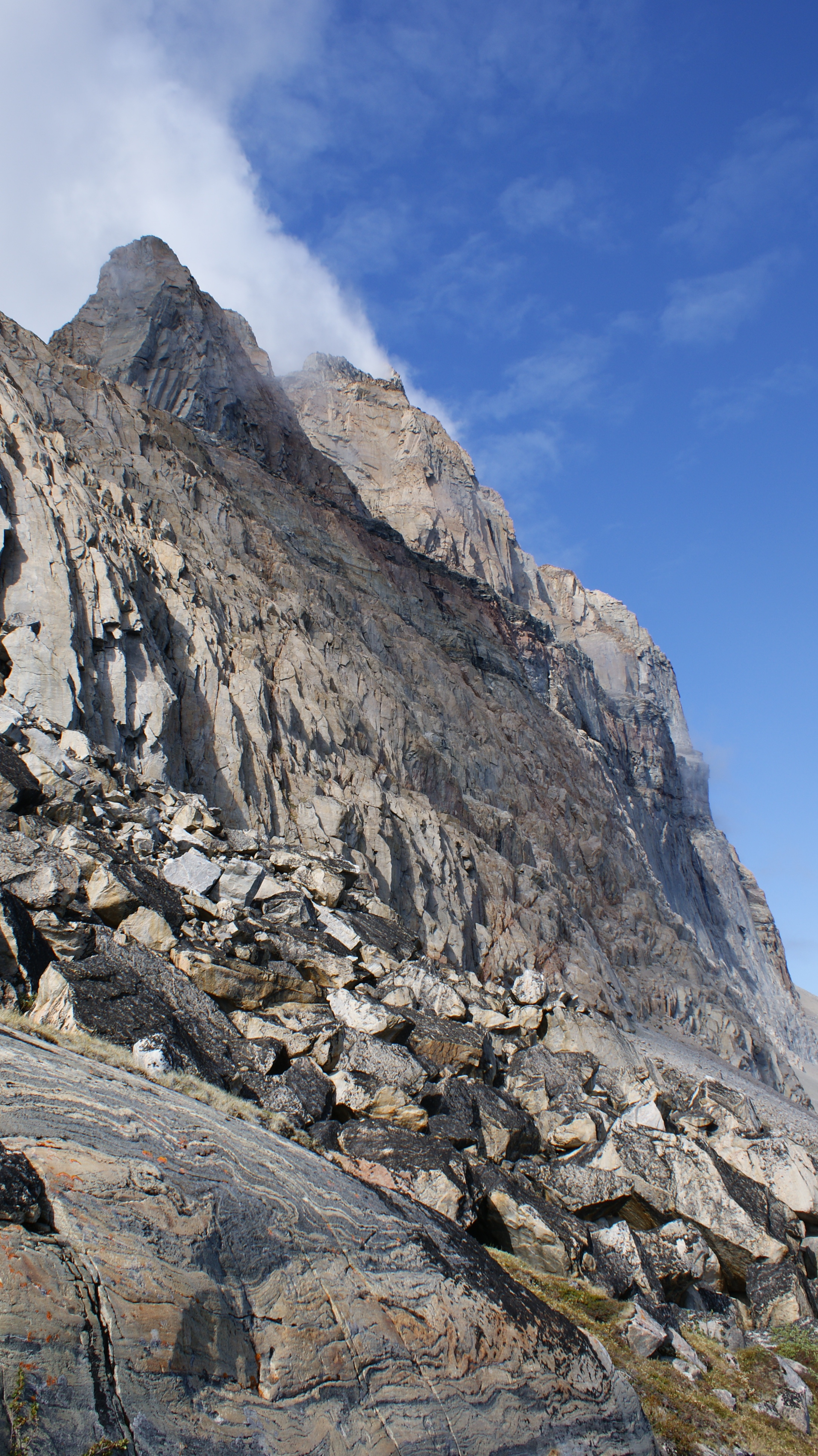
Eastern summit, eastern wall in profile
