= Arctic Umiaq Line =

Passenger and cargo coastal ferry in Greenland

- Type: Aktieselskab
- Industry: Transport
- Founded: 2006
- Headquarters: Nuuk, Greenland
- Area served: Greenland
- Products: Coastal trade and passenger ferry
- Net income: ▼DKK 8.1 million (2011)
- Number of employees: 43
- Parent: Royal Arctic Line (100%)
- Website: www.aul.gl

Arctic Umiaq Line A/S (AUL), also known simply as Arctic Umiaq, is a passenger and freight shipping company operating in Greenland. The company's name is derived from the Kalaallisut word umiaq, which refers to the traditional Inuit passenger boat, distinct from the kayak, which was primarily used for hunting. Arctic Umiaq provides a vital maritime connection along the western and southwestern coasts of Greenland, facilitating transport, supply, and communication between coastal settlements. It is a wholly owned subsidiary of Royal Arctic Line.

== History ==
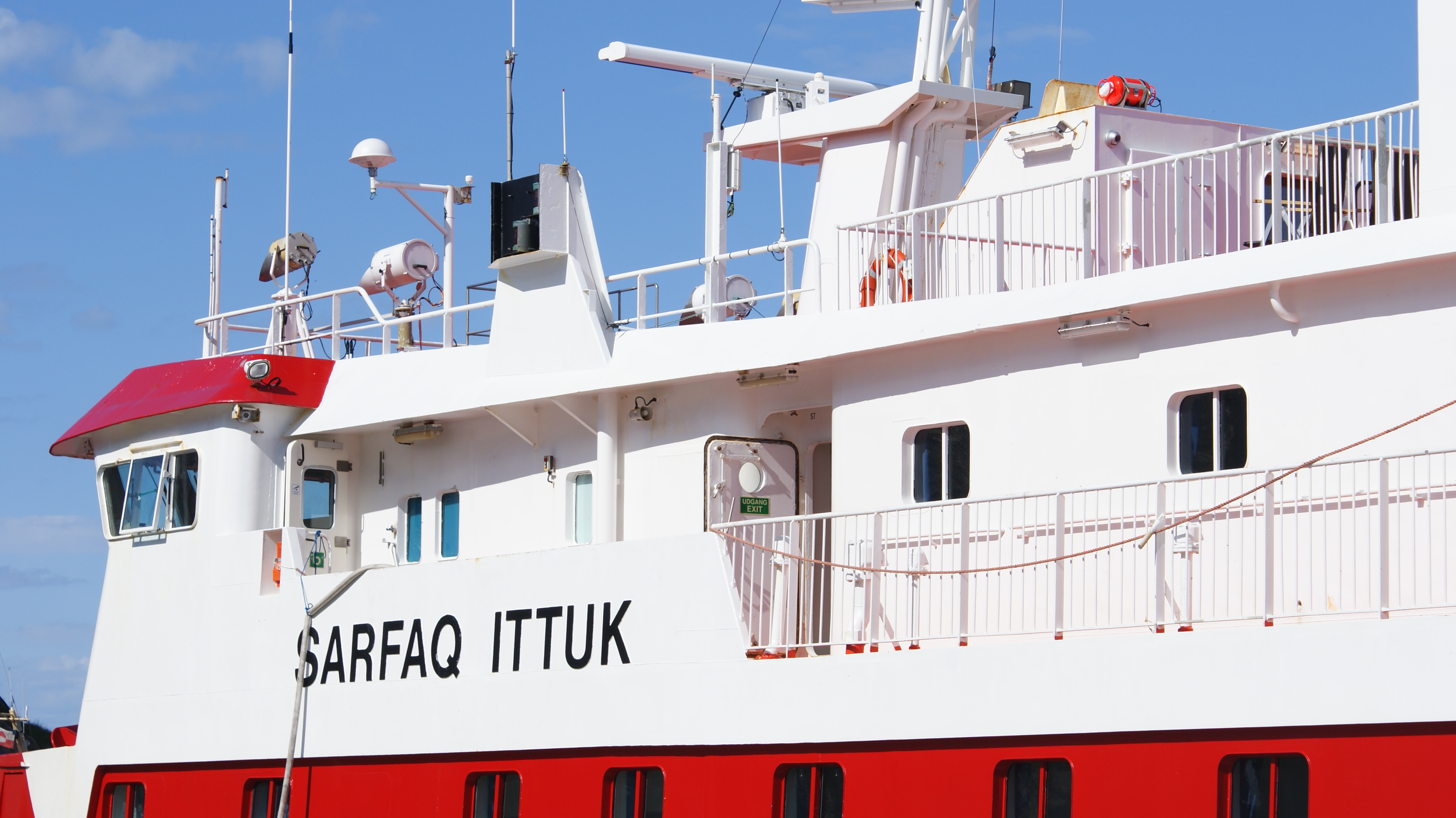
Sarfaq Ittuk moored at Ilulissat port

Arctic Umiaq Line traces its origins to Den Kongelige Grønlandske Handel (KGH), which was responsible for colonial trade in Greenland starting in 1774. In 1986, KGH was placed under the administration of the Greenlandic government and was restructured into the state-owned enterprise KNI in 1992–1993. A subsidiary of KNI, Pilersuisoq, was tasked with passenger and freight shipping, utilizing the vessels Saqqit Ittuk, Sarfaq Ittuk, and Sarpik Ittuk, which operated in northern, central, and southern Greenland, respectively. By the following year, all ships were reassigned to routes covering the entire western coast of Greenland due to operational demand.

On 1 July 1997, a political decision led to the formation of KNI Rederi, a new entity responsible for maritime transport. On 1 January 1998, freight services were transferred to Royal Arctic Bygdeservice, a subsidiary of Royal Arctic Line, while KNI Rederi was separated from the KNI group to focus exclusively on passenger services, continuing as a state-owned company. In February 1998, KNI Rederi was renamed Arctic Umiaq Line.

Some sources list 2006 as the founding year of Arctic Umiaq Line, reflecting the point at which the company became distinct from its predecessors. Like many Greenlandic enterprises, it evolved from divisions of the Royal Greenland Trade Department, which was reorganized following its 1986 transfer to the Greenland Home Rule Government.

Since 2007, Arctic Umiaq Line has been operating at a deficit, with the CEO Søren Grønhøj Andersen sued for mismanagement. The company carried fewer passengers for the first nine months of 2009 than in the comparable period of the previous year.

The Greenland Home Rule Government has continued to provide loss guarantees to the joint owners. In fiscal 2011, this amounted to DKK 8.1 million, and Royal Arctic Line announced that loss guarantees have been secured through 2016.

Ownership in The Arctic Umiaq Line was shared equally between Air Greenland and Royal Arctic Line until 2016. In 2016, Air Greenland sold its 50% stake in the company to Royal Arctic Line, and since July 1, 2016 the Arctic Umiaq Line has operated as a wholly owned subsidiary of Royal Arctic Line.

== Operations ==
Map of the coastal route of Arctic Umiaq

The ferry service operates seasonally from late April to early January. As of 2020, Arctic Umiaq Line employs 43 staff members, and operates a single vessel on the Ilulissat–Narsaq route along the western and southwestern coast of Greenland.

=== Ports of call ===
The Sarfaq Ittuk stops in the following towns on its coastal journey, with the approximate times for a southbound journey listed for illustration:

Name	Latitude N	Elapsed time (hours)	Notes
Ilulissat	69°13′12″	0	
Aasiaat	68°42′35″	04.30	
Sisimiut	66°56′20″	16.00	
Kangaamiut	65°49′30″	24.30	
Maniitsoq	65°25′00″	28.30	
Nuuk	64°10′00″	37.30	The longest, 2-hour stop
Qeqertarsuatsiaat	63°05′20″	47.30	
Paamiut	61°59′40″	54.30	
Arsuk	61°10′30″	61.15	
Qaqortoq	60°43′20″	70.00	The ship turns northeast at Qaqortoq, sailing to Narsaq via Tunulliarfik Fjord
Narsaq	60°54′44″	73.00	Summer only

By 2008, the service had been extended to Narsarsuaq during summer.

== Fleet ==
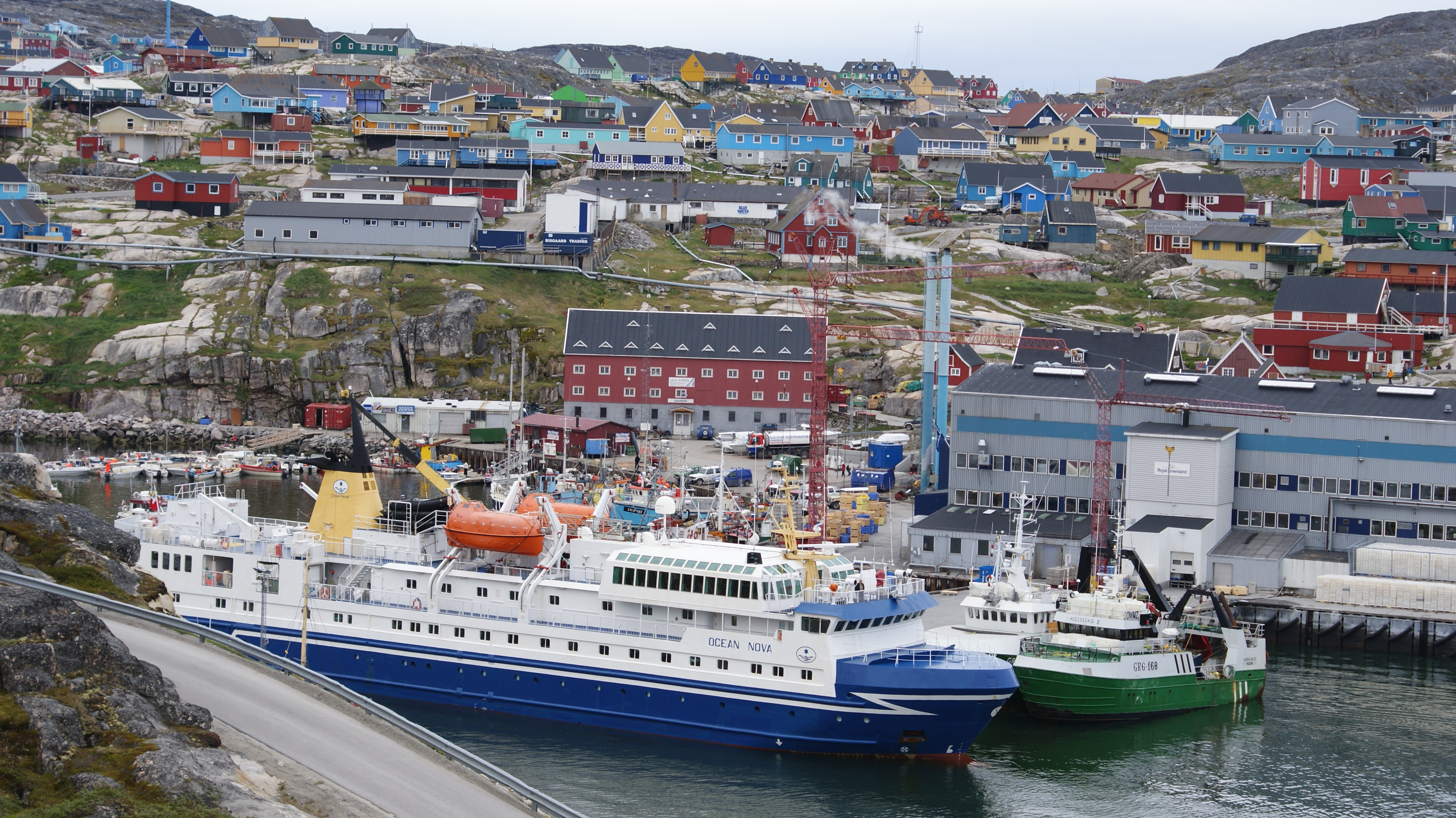
Sarpik Ittuk now sails as M/S Ocean Nova of Nova Cruising.

=== Current fleet ===
The only vessel currently in operation is M/S Sarfaq Ittuk (IMO 8913899). Built in 1992, the ship was renovated and upgraded in 2000 at the Gdańsk Shipyard in Gdańsk, Poland.

The vessel has a passenger capacity of 249, including 52 two-bed cabins and 145 communal rollout beds (compartment or couchette-style) located on the two lower decks.

It measures 72.8 metres in overall length, has a gross tonnage of 2,118, and a deadweight (freight) capacity of 163 tonnes.

=== Former fleet ===
M/S Sarpik Ittuk – which formerly operated routes in the Upernavik Archipelago, the Uummannaq Fjord region, and Disko Bay. – was sold in 2006 to Nova Cruising, a company based in the Bahamas.

As of 2010 Disko Bay is served by Diskoline on the governmental contract, whereas transport services between Upernavik Archipelago and the Uummannaq Fjord region are provided by infrequent cargo/ferry ships of Royal Arctic Line.

== Photographs ==
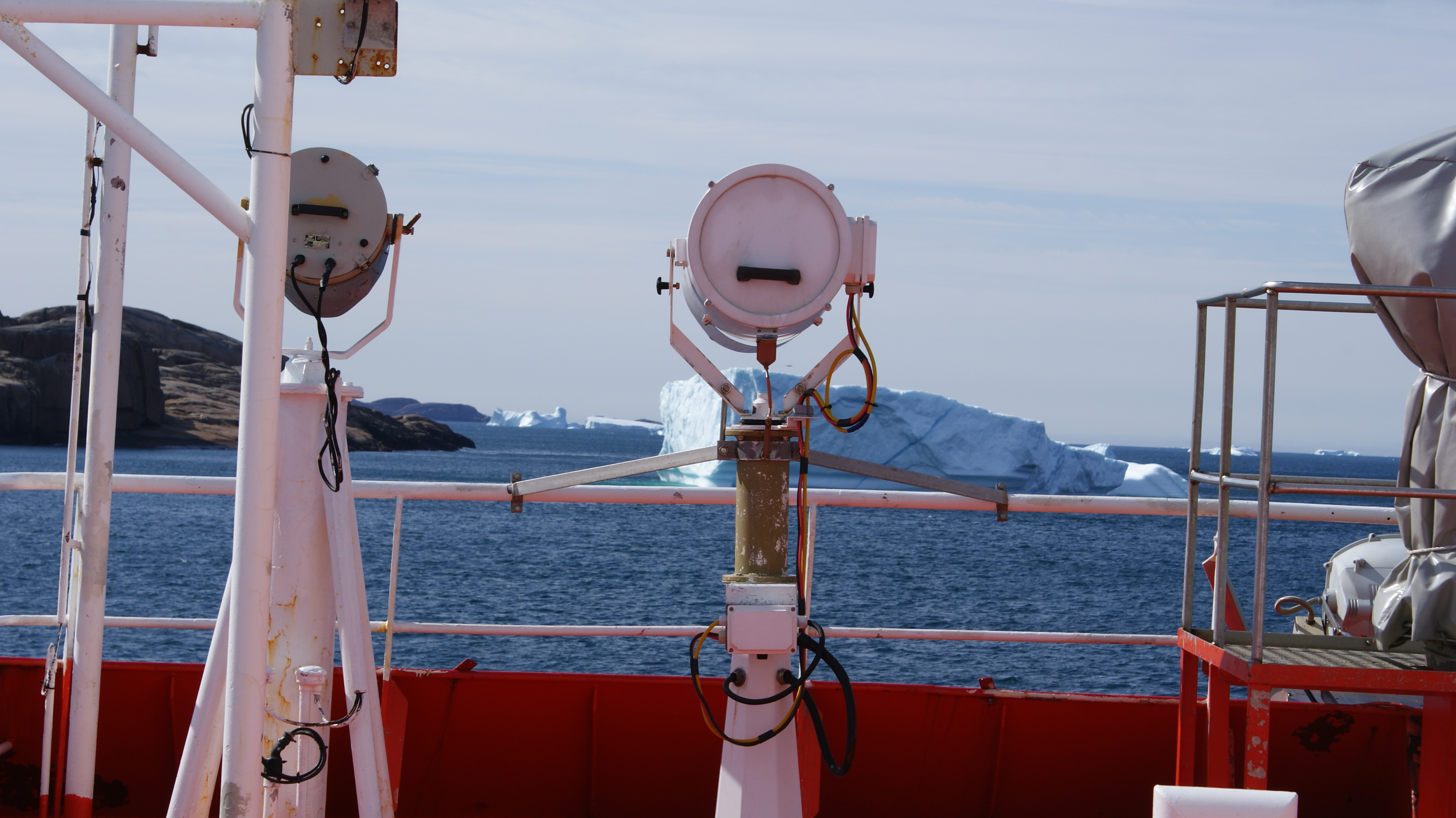
Sarfaq Ittuk navigating between icebergs south of Arsuk, in the vicinity of Alaanorssuaq. View from the bow.

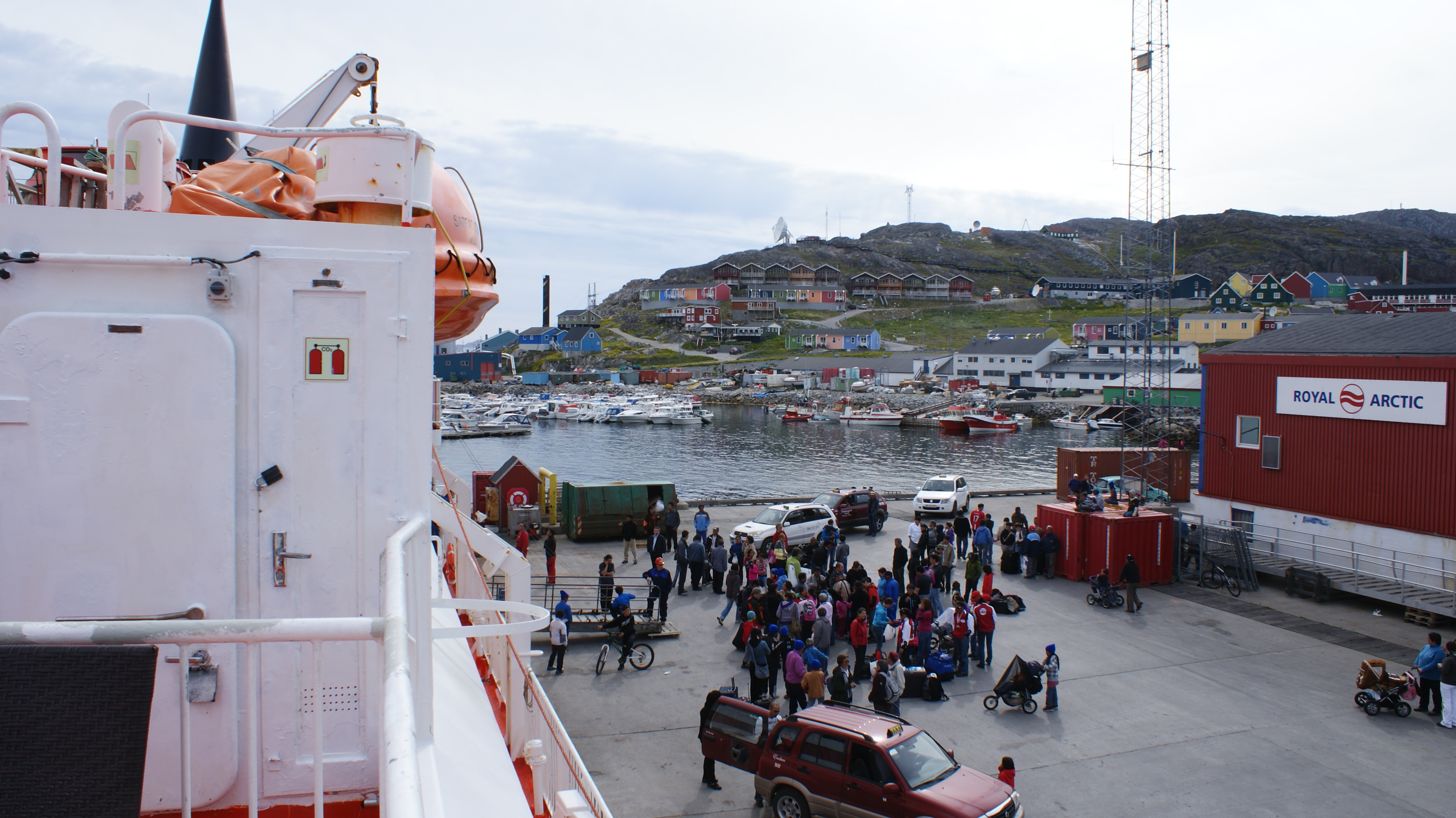
Sarfaq Ittuk − passenger exchange at Qaqortoq port

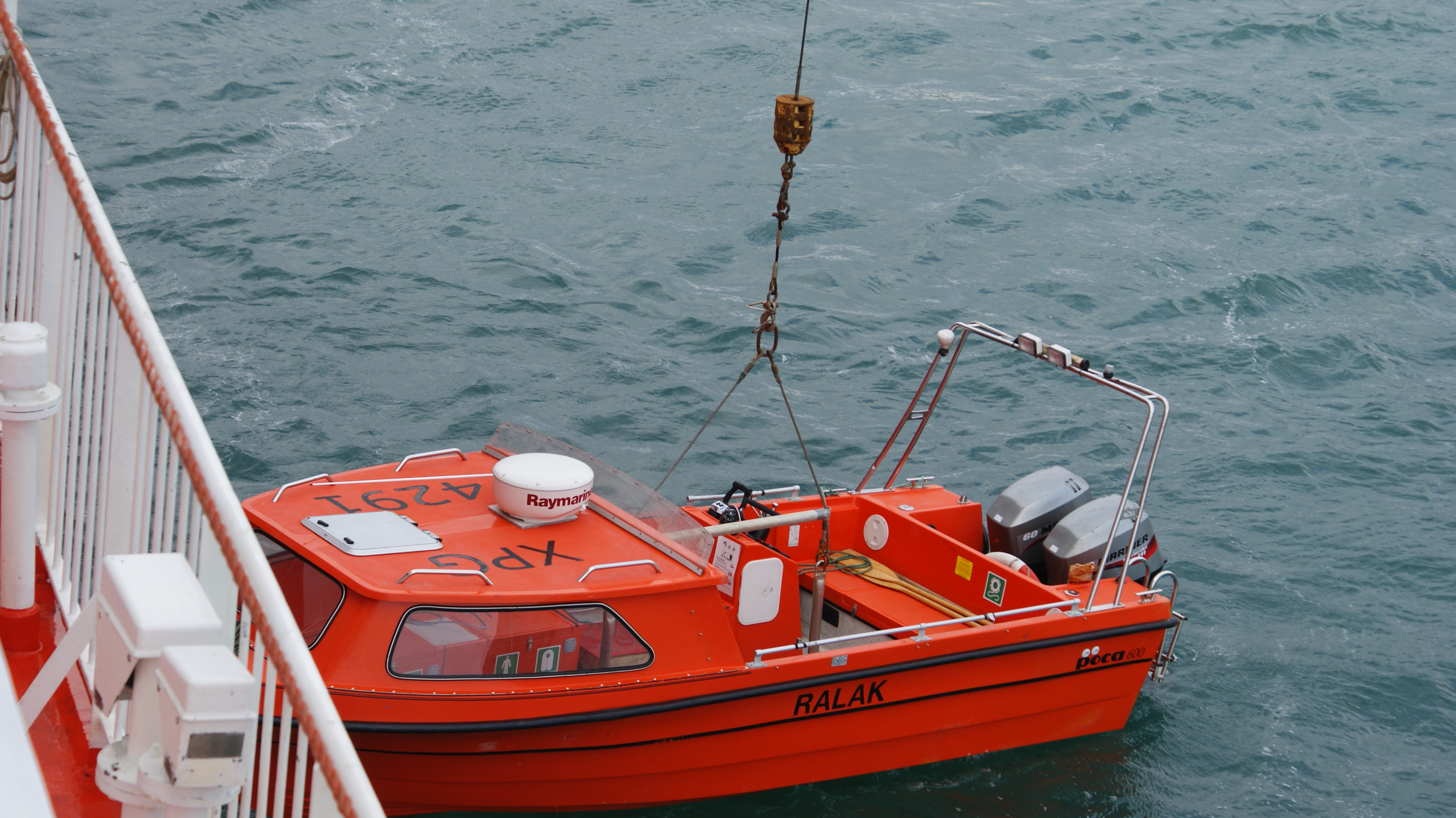
Ferry boat deployed from Sarfaq Ittuk at Kangaamiut. The settlement does not have an adequate port due to constrained waterways; the passengers are ferried back and forth instead.

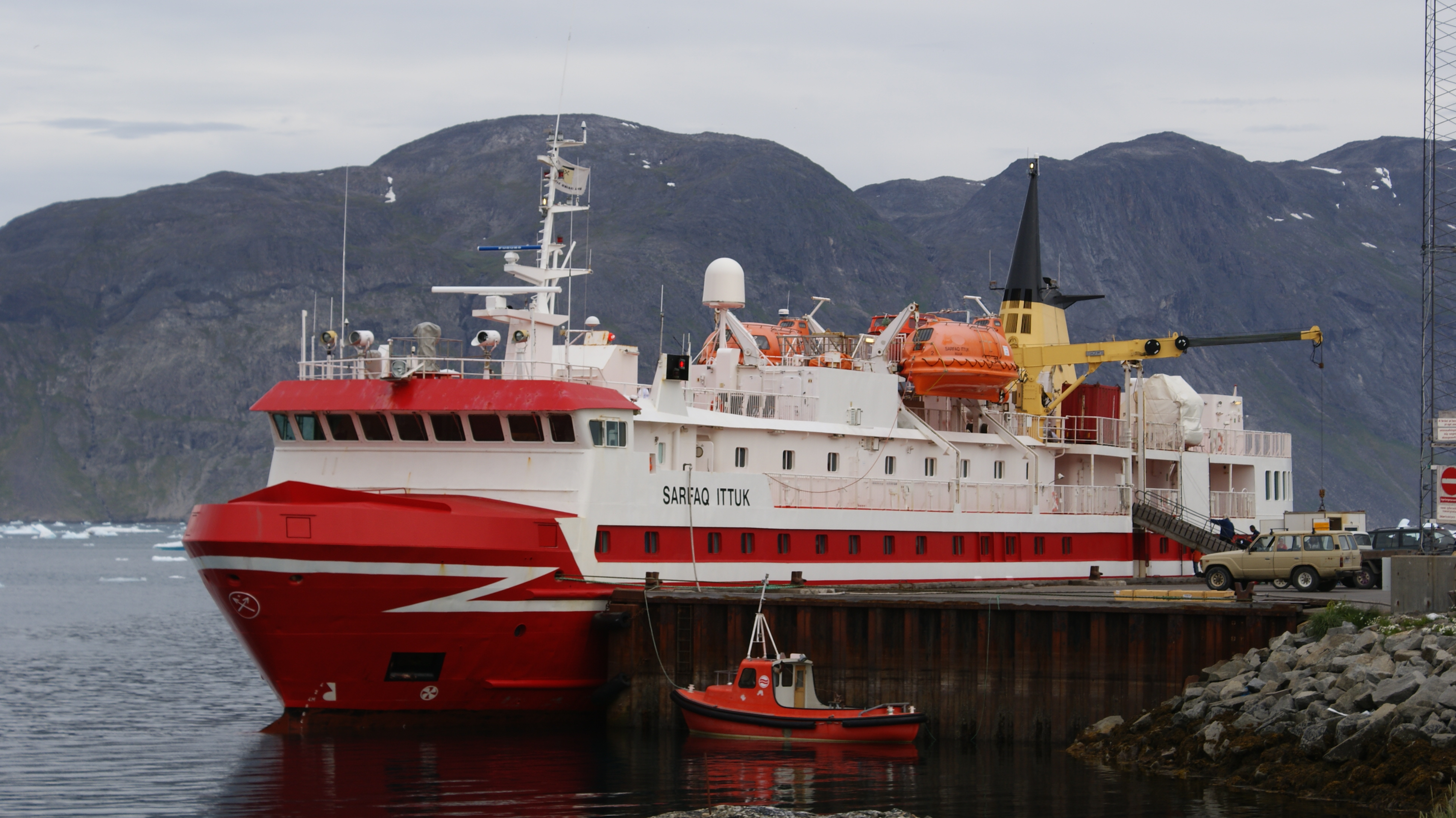
Sarfaq Ittuk moored at Narsaq port

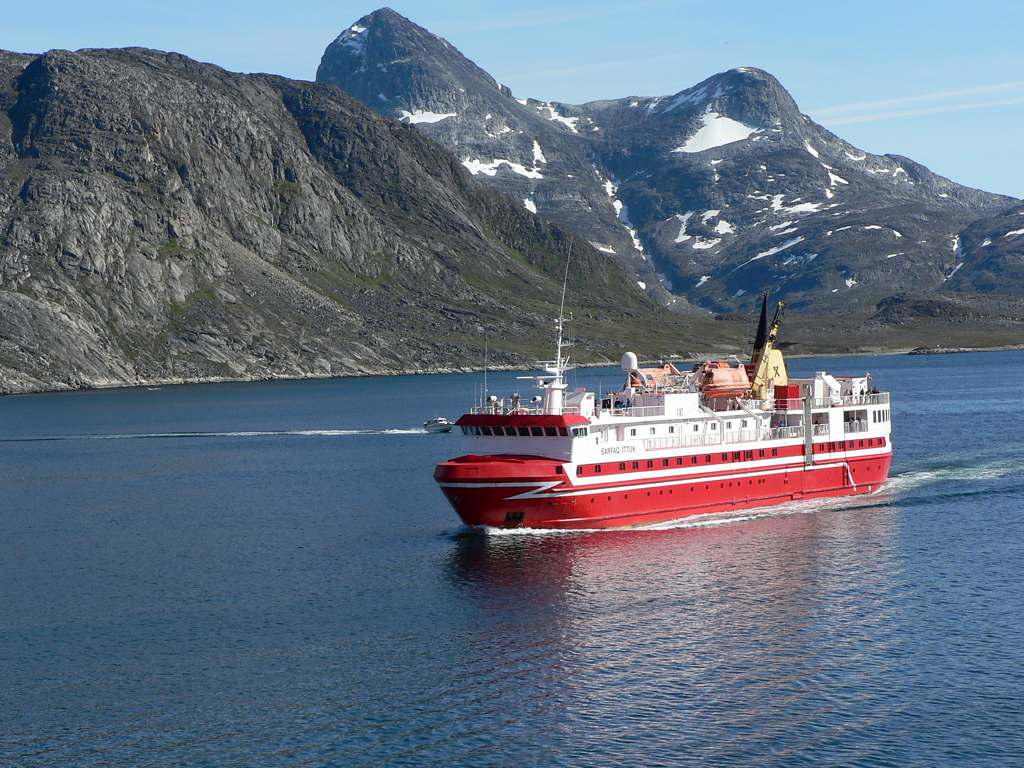
M/S Sarfaq Ittuk
