= Royal Arctic Line =

Shipping line based in Greenland

Royal Arctic Line A/S
- Company type: Aktieselskab
- Industry: Transport
- Founded: 1993
- Headquarters: Nuuk, Greenland
- Area served: Greenland
- Key people: Niels Clemensen (CEO); Aviâja Lyberth Lennert (Deputy CEO); Pâviâraq Heilmann (Chairman of the Board)
- Products: Coastal freight
- Revenue: DKK 897 million
- Operating income: DKK 104 million
- Net income: DKK 73 million
- Number of employees: About 850 (2021)
- Subsidiaries: Royal Arctic Line Denmark A/S (100%); Royal Arctic Logistics A/S (100%); Arctic Umiaq Line A/S (100%); Arctic Base Supply A/S (50%); Ejendomsselskabet Suliffik A/S (30.3%)
- Website: ral.gl
- Footnotes / references (2011)

Royal Arctic Line A/S (RAL) or Royal Arctic is a seaborne freight company in Greenland, wholly owned by the Government of Greenland. It was formed in 1993, and is headquartered in Nuuk.

== History ==
Royal Arctic Line A/S was spun off as a company separate from the Greenlandic conglomerate KNI in 1993. Like many Greenlandic companies, its operations derive from and carry on the traditions of the earlier Royal Greenland Trading Department.

In 2020, Royal Arctic Line entered into a partnership with Icelandic shipping line Eimskip. RAL therefore began calling in Reykjavík for the first time, easing onward shipping to North America.

== Operations ==
The company has a monopoly on all sea transport of cargo to, from, and within Greenland. Construction materials account for roughly a quarter of shipping to Greenland; fish makes up roughly half of shipping from Greenland; fish and beverages bottled at Nuuk (principally water and beer) account for most shipping within Greenland.

Royal Arctic operates cargo routes among the Greenland settlements and between Nuuk and Aarhus in Denmark and manages 13 harbors in Greenland, which serves as the source for all European shipping to the island. Seaborne traffic from North America goes to Reykjavík aboard Eimskip, whence it is carried to Greenland aboard Royal Arctic Line.

In 2011, government concessions accounted for 76% of the company's income. The Transport Committee newly formed by the Greenland Home Rule government issued a report stating that liberalisation of the shipping market offers no benefits and the current concession is reasonable. It also began planning with RAL and stakeholders to expand the harbors in Nuuk and Sisimiut.

== Divisions ==
=== Linietrafik (Line Traffic) ===
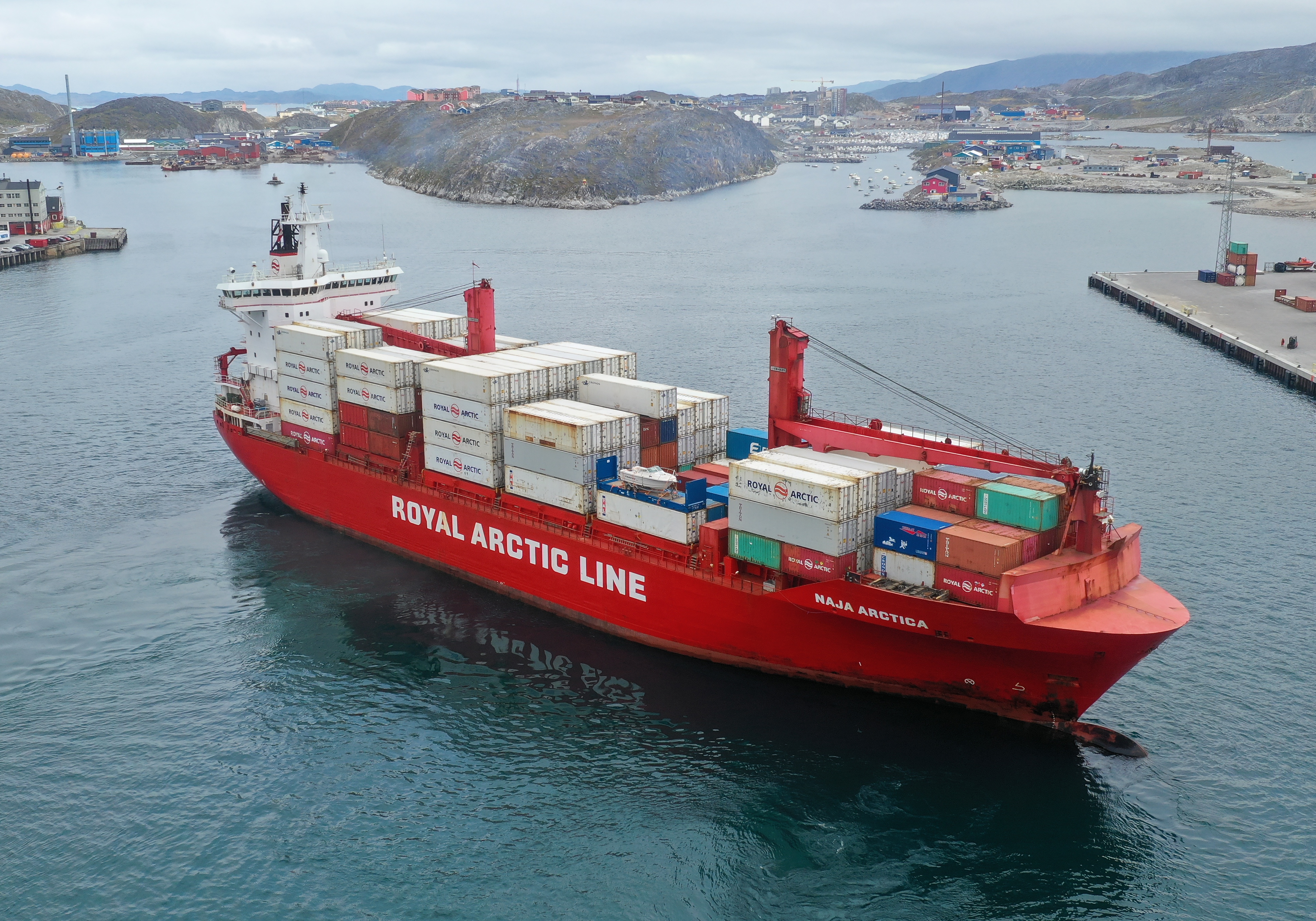
Naja Arctica arriving in Nuuk, Greenland

Royal Arctic Linietrafik operates the company's fleet, currently consisting of ten ships.

=== Havneservice (Portservices) ===
Royal Arctic Havneservice operates the company's harbour operations and nearby lighthouses.

- Aarhus (Denmark)
- Aasiaat
- Ilulissat
- Maniitsoq
- Nanortalik
- Narsaq
- Nuuk (home port of Royal Arctic Line)
- Paamiut
- Qaqortoq
- Qasigiannguit
- Sisimiut
- Tasiilaq (July–November)
- Upernavik (June–December)
- Uummannaq (June–December)

Some other towns such Qaanaaq, Pituffik, Kangerlussuaq, Ittoqqortoormiit and stations in Northeast Greenland National Park in Greenland are served only once to three times per year. Reykjavík in Iceland is served every three weeks on runs to South Greenland and Nuuk and on most trips to East Greenland.

== Subsidiaries ==
=== Royal Arctic Line Denmark ===
Royal Arctic Line Denmark A/S is a wholly owned subsidiary based in Aarhus, Denmark.

=== Arctic Umiaq ===
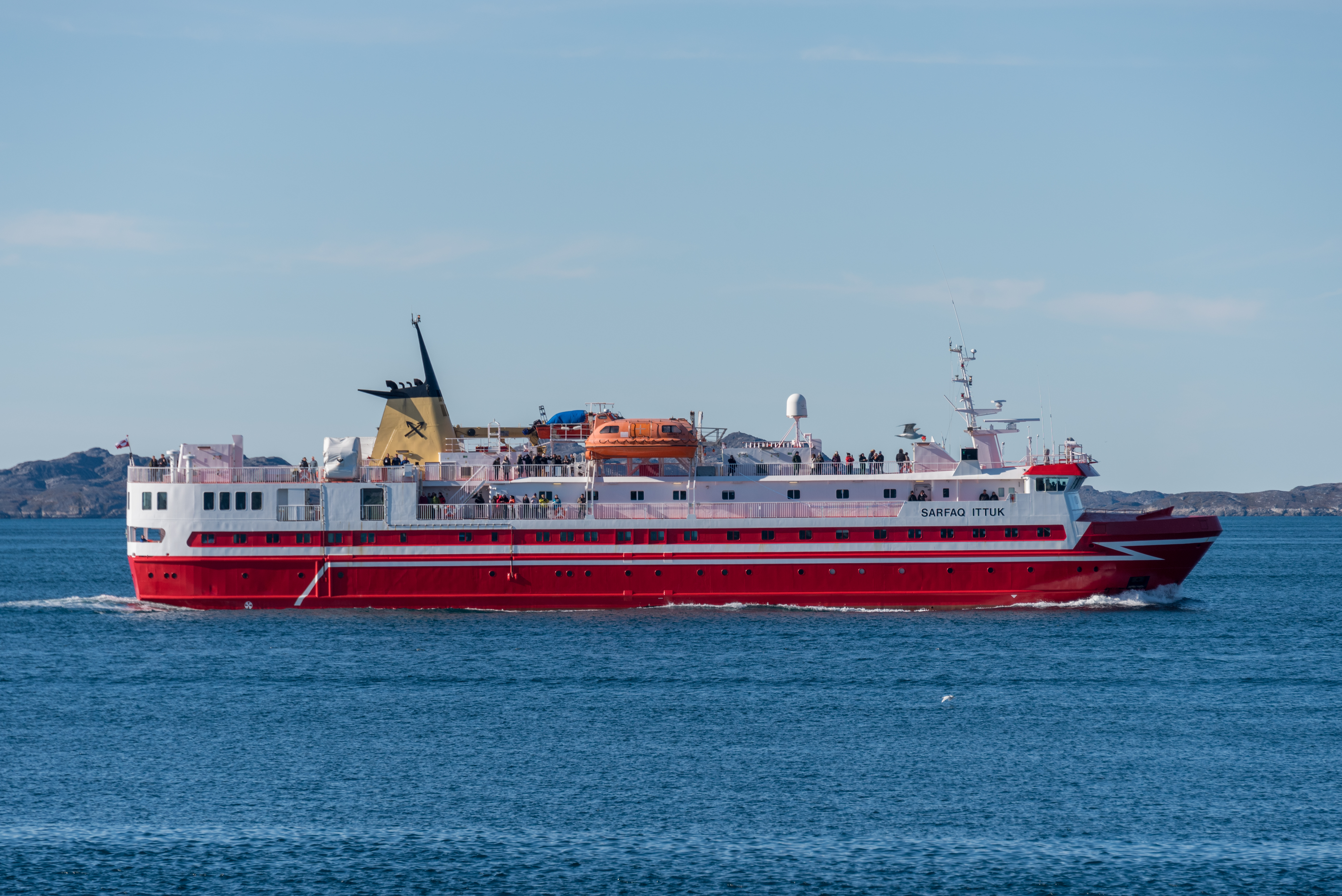
Arctic Umiaq ferry, Sarfaq Ittuk, passing Old Harbor in Nuuk, Greenland.

Arctic Umiaq Line A/S is a wholly owned subsidiary of the Royal Arctic Line and based in Nuuk. It operates one passenger ferry, Sarfaq Ittuk, among communities along the western coast of Greenland. Its 2011 operating loss of DKK 8.1 million was made good via a loss guarantee from Greenland Home Rule, and the company has secured an agreement for further loss guarantees through 2016.

=== Arctic Base Supply ===
Arctic Base Supply A/S is owned jointly (50% each) with Danbor and based in Nuuk. It provides logistical support for offshore oil and gas exploration and, in 2011, assisted Capricorn Energy in its work at Nuuk and Aasiaat. No activity is expected in 2012, however.

=== Ejendomsselskabet Suliffik ===
Ejendomsselskabet Suliffik A/S ("Suliffik Property Co.") is a subsidiary (30.3%) owned jointly with Royal Greenland (30.3%) and TELE Greenland (39%).
