= MS Fram =

Expedition ship built in 2007

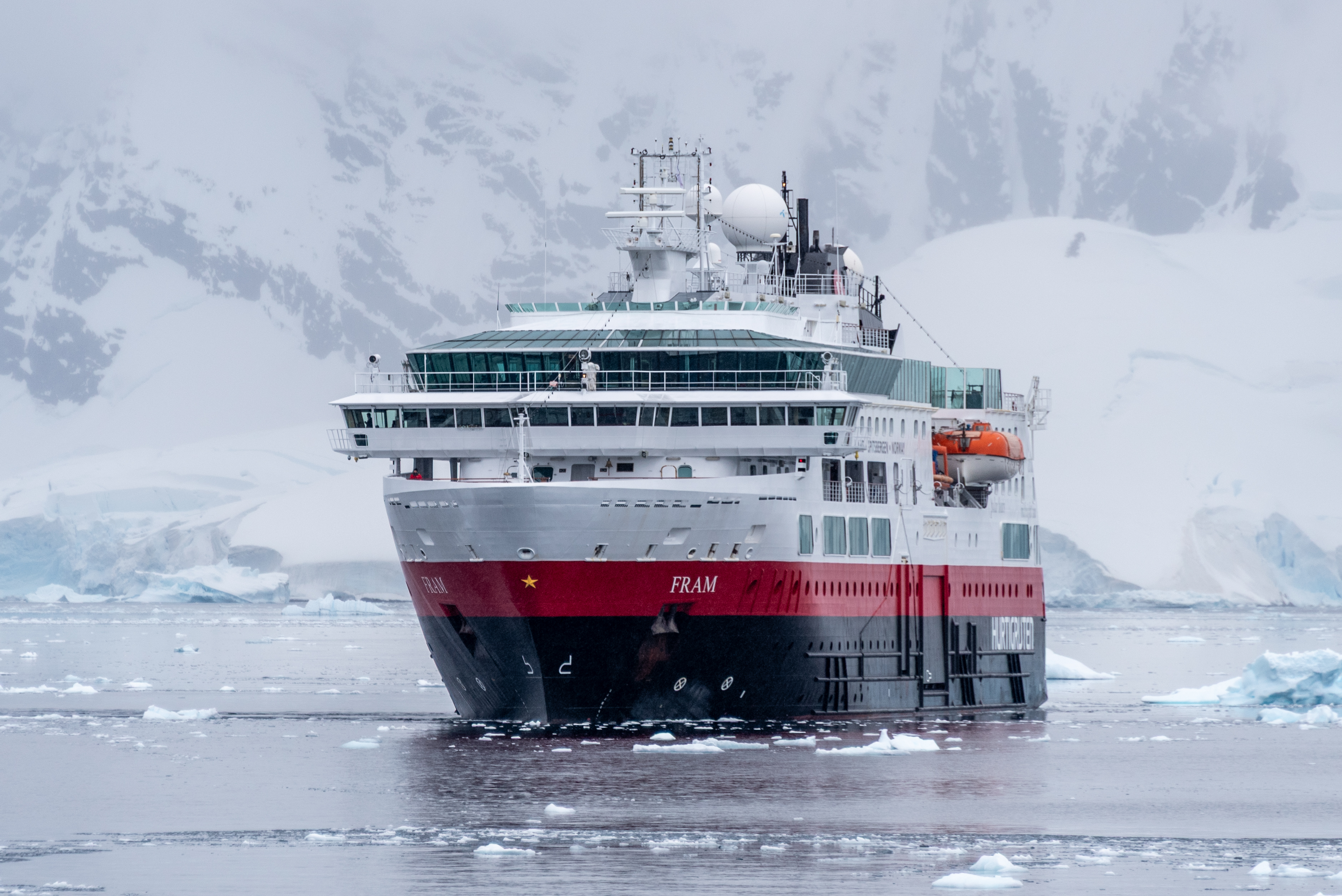
- MS Fram at Brown Station in Paradise Bay, Antarctica

History
- Name: Fram
- Operator: Hurtigruten
- Port of registry: Tromsø, Norway
- Builder: Fincantieri, Italy
- Laid down: March 2006
- Launched: 18 November 2006
- Christened: May 2007
- Identification: IMO number: 9370018
- Status: In service

General characteristics
- Tonnage: 12,700 GT
- Length: 114 m (374 ft 0 in)
- Beam: 20.2 m (66 ft 3 in)
- Decks: Eight
- Ice class: 1B
- Speed: 13 knots (24 km/h; 15 mph)
- Capacity: 400 passengers; 280 berths

MS Fram is a passenger vessel operated by the Norway-based Hurtigruten. The ship is named after the original Fram, the ship used by explorers Fridtjof Nansen and Roald Amundsen. The ship operates in the Arctic Ocean and around Greenland in the summer, and cruises around Antarctica at other times of the year. In December 2007, the ship lost power and struck a glacier in Antarctica, sustaining damage to the starboard side; the collision did not affect the ship's seaworthiness.
