= Royal Greenland =

Fishing company in Greenland

- Company type: Aktieselskab
- Industry: Seafood; Fishing
- Founded: 1774 as Den Kongelige Grøndlandske Handel
- Headquarters: Nuuk, Greenland
- Area served: Worldwide
- Key people: Niels Søren Thomsen (chairman); Toke Binzer (CEO)
- Products: Seafood; Caviar; Commercial fishing Fish processing Convenience; Smoked and Marinated fish Dried fish
- Revenue: ▼DKK 5,622 million (2024)
- Net income: ▼DKK -265 million (2024)
- Number of employees: 2,087 (2024)
- Subsidiaries: List: Royal Greenland Seafood A/S; Nuussuaq Fish ApS; Sandgreen ApS; 7170629 Canada Inc; Ittu A/S; Kuunnaat Trawl A/S; Ice Trawl Greenland A/S
- Website: royalgreenland.com

Royal Greenland A/S is a Greenlandic fishing company. It is fully owned by the Greenlandic self-government and is the country's largest company. The company describes itself as "working locally and selling globally for the benefit of our 56,000 Greenlandic co-owners". The company has about 2,000 employees, of which approximately 1,300 are in Greenland. The company's headquarters are located in Nuuk.

Royal Greenland's management consists of Toke Binzer (CEO), Jan H. Lynge (EVP and CFO), and Bodil Marie Damgaard (EVP HR and Communication).

The company's board of directors includes Niels Søren Thorsen (chairperson), Preben Sunke, Karsten Høy, Arnanguaq Holm Olsen, Johan Bertelsen, Susanne Kure, Niels Ole Møller, and Sara Biilmann Egede.

== Fishing ==
The company is engaged in core species such as cold-water shrimp, Greenland halibut, snow crab, and cod. Sales from the four catch groups account for 83% of the company's revenue of 5.622 billion Danish kroner.

Royal Greenland's own fishing delivered 54,000 tons of raw materials in 2024, while independent fishermen delivered 57,544 tons of raw materials in the same year.

The company has 49 factories in Greenland, Canada, and Germany, which process and package the catches into finished products.

Royal Greenland's fleet consists of nine offshore trawlers for fishing shrimp, Greenland halibut, cod, and pelagic species, as well as one inshore shrimp trawler. The company launched a comprehensive fleet renewal program in 2019 to strengthen the company's competitiveness and product capacity. The program was completed in the summer of 2025 with the return of the fifth and final trawler, Kaassaassuk, which has the latest technology on board, including robotic palletizing.

== Social responsibility ==
Royal Greenland operates based on a "social contract" with the aim of contributing positively and making a difference for the Greenlandic society.

This includes, among other things, educating and developing employees, strengthening local communities, acting responsibly and respectfully with local fishermen, and protecting the biological and social sustainability in the areas where the company operates.

== History ==
In 1774, Denmark–Norway established the Royal Greenland Trading Department. The Home Rule Government was introduced in 1979 and gained control of the company in 1986, renaming it Kalaallit Niuerfiat. Royal Greenland was spun off into a separate company in 1990.

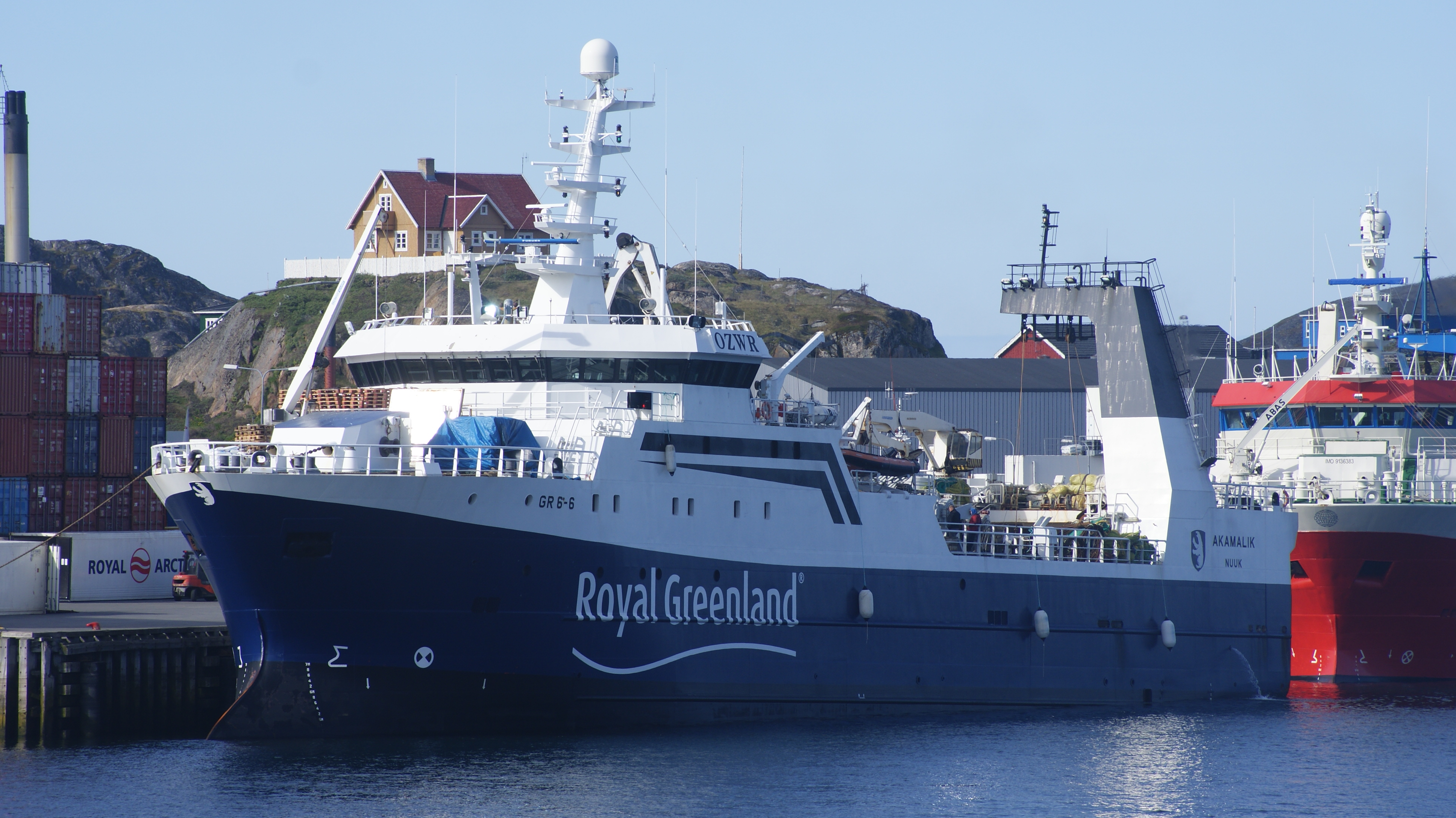
HDMS Akamalik, a Royal Greenland vessel, anchored in Sisimiut
