= 1971 Greenlandic Provincial Council election =

- 16 April 1971
- All 16 seats in the Provincial Council (plus compensatory seats)
- Turnout: 67.69%
| Party | Leader | Vote % | Seats | +/– |
|---|---|---|---|---|
| KNAPK | Lamik Møller | 6.50 | 1 | +1 |
| Independents | – | 84.70 | 16 | 0 |
This lists parties that won seats. See the complete results below.
| Chairman before | Chairman after |
|---|---|
| Erling Høegh; Independent | Lars Chemnitz; Independent |

Provincial Council elections were held in Greenland on 16 April 1971.

== Electoral system ==
Members of the Provincial Council were elected by first-past-the-post voting in 16 single-member constituencies. Political parties or lists were entitled to compensatory seats if they received more than one-sixteenth of the valid votes cast (6.25%).

== Results ==
As KNAPK received more than 6.25% of the valid vote, they were entitled to a compensatory seat.

| Party | Votes | % | Seats |
|---|---|---|---|
| KNAPK | 923 | 6.50 | 1 |
| Arnat Peqatigiit Kattuffiat | 402 | 2.83 | 0 |
| Blue Cross | 354 | 2.49 | 0 |
| National Confederation of Trade Unions | 339 | 2.39 | 0 |
| Greenland Business Association | 155 | 1.09 | 0 |
| Independents | 12,025 | 84.70 | 16 |
| Total | 14,198 | 100.00 | 17 |
| Valid votes | 14,198 | 97.09 | |
| Invalid/blank votes | 426 | 2.91 | |
| Total votes | 14,624 | 100.00 | |
| Registered voters/turnout | 21,501 | 68.02 | |
Source: Atuagagdliutit, Danmarks Statistik

=== By constituency ===
Aasiaat
| Candidate | Party | Votes | % |
|---|---|---|---|
| Otto Steenholdt | Independent | 357 | 35.24 |
| Ado Lynge | Independent | 264 | 26.06 |
| Jens Pavia Egede | Independent | 143 | 14.12 |
| Lars Møller | Independent | 136 | 13.43 |
| Mads Hendriksen | Blue Cross | 50 | 4.94 |
| Lars Ostermann | Independent | 42 | 4.15 |
| Søren Hansen | National Confederation of Trade Unions | 21 | 2.07 |
| Total | | 1,013 | 100.00 |
| Valid votes | | 1,013 | 98.06 |
| Invalid votes | | 7 | 0.68 |
| Blank votes | | 13 | 1.26 |
| Total votes | | 1,033 | 100.00 |
| Registered voters/turnout | | 1,361 | 75.90 |

Angmagssalik
| Candidate | Party | Votes | % |
|---|---|---|---|
| Erinarteq Jonathansen | Independent | 147 | 25.00 |
| Josva Maqe | Independent | 116 | 19.73 |
| Jakob Maqe | Independent | 109 | 18.54 |
| Karl Pivat | Independent | 75 | 12.76 |
| Aron Davidsen | Independent | 69 | 11.73 |
| Aage Chemnitz | Blue Cross | 42 | 7.14 |
| Karline Motzfeldt | Arnat Peqatigiit Kattuffiat | 30 | 5.10 |
| Total | | 588 | 100.00 |
| Valid votes | | 588 | 97.51 |
| Invalid votes | | 13 | 2.16 |
| Blank votes | | 2 | 0.33 |
| Total votes | | 603 | 100.00 |
| Registered voters/turnout | | 1,042 | 57.87 |

Ilulissat
| Candidate | Party | Votes | % |
|---|---|---|---|
| Lars Chemnitz | Independent | 483 | 34.95 |
| Niels Svendsen | Independent | 321 | 23.23 |
| Otto Sandgreen | Independent | 262 | 18.96 |
| Wilhelm Olsen | Independent | 202 | 14.62 |
| Lars Mathæussen | National Confederation of Trade Unions | 67 | 4.85 |
| Arne Hansen | Greenland Business Association | 47 | 3.40 |
| Total | | 1,382 | 100.00 |
| Valid votes | | 1,382 | 96.17 |
| Invalid votes | | 47 | 3.27 |
| Blank votes | | 8 | 0.56 |
| Total votes | | 1,437 | 100.00 |
| Registered voters/turnout | | 2,231 | 64.41 |

Ittoqqortoormiit
| Candidate | Party | Votes | % |
|---|---|---|---|
| Andreas Sanimuinaq | Independent | 81 | 50.00 |
| Jakob Simonsen | Independent | 81 | 50.00 |
| Total | | 162 | 100.00 |
| Valid votes | | 162 | 95.86 |
| Invalid votes | | 4 | 2.37 |
| Blank votes | | 3 | 1.78 |
| Total votes | | 169 | 100.00 |
| Registered voters/turnout | | 223 | 75.78 |

Kangaatsiaq
| Candidate | Party | Votes | % |
|---|---|---|---|
| Nikolaj Karlsen | Independent | 197 | 58.63 |
| Niels Siegstad | Independent | 139 | 41.37 |
| Total | | 336 | 100.00 |
| Valid votes | | 336 | 97.11 |
| Invalid votes | | 4 | 1.16 |
| Blank votes | | 6 | 1.73 |
| Total votes | | 346 | 100.00 |
| Registered voters/turnout | | 413 | 83.78 |

Maniitsoq
| Candidate | Party | Votes | % |
|---|---|---|---|
| Alibak Josefsen | Independent | 377 | 34.34 |
| Niels Carlo Heilmann | KNAPK | 312 | 28.42 |
| Jens Heilmann | Independent | 206 | 18.76 |
| Kristine Donadussen | Arnat Peqatigiit Kattuffiat | 110 | 10.02 |
| Ole Skifte | Independent | 93 | 8.47 |
| Total | | 1,098 | 100.00 |
| Valid votes | | 1,098 | 96.91 |
| Invalid votes | | 28 | 2.47 |
| Blank votes | | 7 | 0.62 |
| Total votes | | 1,133 | 100.00 |
| Registered voters/turnout | | 1,791 | 63.26 |

Nanortalik
| Candidate | Party | Votes | % |
|---|---|---|---|
| Marius Abelsen | Independent | 453 | 40.74 |
| Jens Adolfsen | KNAPK | 250 | 22.48 |
| Otto Korneliussen | Independent | 234 | 21.04 |
| Adam Nielsen | Independent | 175 | 15.74 |
| Total | | 1,112 | 100.00 |
| Valid votes | | 1,112 | 98.15 |
| Invalid/blank votes | | 21 | 1.85 |
| Total votes | | 1,133 | 100.00 |
| Registered voters/turnout | | 1,443 | 78.52 |

Narsaq
| Candidate | Party | Votes | % |
|---|---|---|---|
| Johan Knudsen | Independent | 410 | 46.70 |
| Niels Holm | Independent | 348 | 39.64 |
| Ole Egede | Independent | 95 | 10.82 |
| Børge Brodersen | Greenland Business Association | 25 | 2.85 |
| Total | | 878 | 100.00 |
| Valid votes | | 878 | 97.12 |
| Invalid votes | | 12 | 1.33 |
| Blank votes | | 14 | 1.55 |
| Total votes | | 904 | 100.00 |
| Registered voters/turnout | | 1,216 | 74.34 |

Nuuk
| Candidate | Party | Votes | % |
|---|---|---|---|
| Lars-Emil Johansen | Independent | 747 | 31.47 |
| Peter K. S. Heilmann | Independent | 445 | 18.74 |
| Hansepaajuk Gabrielsen | Independent | 226 | 9.52 |
| Guldborg Chemnitz | Arnat Peqatigiit Kattuffiat | 223 | 9.39 |
| Hans Holm I | KNAPK | 141 | 5.94 |
| Ulrik Rosing | KNAPK | 135 | 5.69 |
| Thomas Berthels | Blue Cross | 134 | 5.64 |
| Odaak Olsen | National Confederation of Trade Unions | 129 | 5.43 |
| Peter Nielsen | Independent | 66 | 2.78 |
| Apollo H. K. J. Lynge | Greenland Business Association | 61 | 2.57 |
| Knud Kleist | Independent | 32 | 1.35 |
| Alibak Johansen | Independent | 26 | 1.10 |
| Laarseeraq Svendsen | Independent | 9 | 0.38 |
| Total | | 2,374 | 100.00 |
| Valid votes | | 2,374 | 96.90 |
| Invalid votes | | 53 | 2.16 |
| Blank votes | | 23 | 0.94 |
| Total votes | | 2,450 | 100.00 |
| Registered voters/turnout | | 4,254 | 57.59 |

Paamiut
| Candidate | Party | Votes | % |
|---|---|---|---|
| Ole Berglund | Independent | 288 | 32.62 |
| Karl M. Josefsen | Independent | 240 | 27.18 |
| Lars Petersen | Independent | 150 | 16.99 |
| Isboseth Petersen | Independent | 102 | 11.55 |
| Akvillas Larsen | Independent | 64 | 7.25 |
| Ane Sofie Hegelund | Arnat Peqatigiit Kattuffiat | 39 | 4.42 |
| Total | | 883 | 100.00 |
| Valid votes | | 883 | 96.61 |
| Invalid votes | | 21 | 2.30 |
| Blank votes | | 10 | 1.09 |
| Total votes | | 914 | 100.00 |
| Registered voters/turnout | | 1,396 | 65.47 |

Qaqortoq
| Candidate | Party | Votes | % |
|---|---|---|---|
| Jonathan Motzfeldt | Independent | 573 | 47.55 |
| Erling Høegh | Independent | 560 | 46.47 |
| Anda Amassen | National Confederation of Trade Unions | 48 | 3.98 |
| Hanning Høegh | KNAPK | 24 | 1.99 |
| Total | | 1,205 | 100.00 |
| Valid votes | | 1,205 | 98.37 |
| Invalid votes | | 11 | 0.90 |
| Blank votes | | 9 | 0.73 |
| Total votes | | 1,225 | 100.00 |
| Registered voters/turnout | | 1,529 | 80.12 |

Qeqertarsuaq
| Candidate | Party | Votes | % |
|---|---|---|---|
| David Broberg | Independent | 436 | 77.30 |
| Ulrik Møller | Blue Cross | 128 | 22.70 |
| Total | | 564 | 100.00 |
| Valid votes | | 564 | 93.07 |
| Invalid votes | | 27 | 4.46 |
| Blank votes | | 15 | 2.48 |
| Total votes | | 606 | 100.00 |
| Registered voters/turnout | | 846 | 71.63 |

Sisimiut
| Candidate | Party | Votes | % |
|---|---|---|---|
| Jørgen C. F. Olsen | Independent | 418 | 42.96 |
| Moses Olsen | Independent | 371 | 38.13 |
| Jonas Jeremiassen | Independent | 81 | 8.32 |
| Kristen Olsen | KNAPK | 61 | 6.27 |
| Simon Thomassen | National Confederation of Trade Unions | 42 | 4.32 |
| Total | | 973 | 100.00 |
| Valid votes | | 973 | 97.30 |
| Invalid votes | | 22 | 2.20 |
| Blank votes | | 5 | 0.50 |
| Total votes | | 1,000 | 100.00 |
| Registered voters/turnout | | 1,635 | 61.16 |

Thule
| Candidate | Party | Votes | % |
|---|---|---|---|
| Qissunguaq Kristiansen | Independent | 124 | 61.39 |
| Peter Jensen | Independent | 78 | 38.61 |
| Total | | 202 | 100.00 |
| Valid votes | | 202 | 99.02 |
| Invalid votes | | 0 | 0.00 |
| Blank votes | | 2 | 0.98 |
| Total votes | | 204 | 100.00 |
| Registered voters/turnout | | 280 | 72.86 |

Upernavik
| Candidate | Party | Votes | % |
|---|---|---|---|
| Knud Kristiansen | Independent | 255 | 42.50 |
| Karl Elias Olsen | Independent | 157 | 26.17 |
| Wilhelm Kristiansen | Independent | 81 | 13.50 |
| Rasmus Jørgensen | Independent | 55 | 9.17 |
| Jørgen Nielsen | Independent | 52 | 8.67 |
| Total | | 600 | 100.00 |
| Valid votes | | 600 | 98.68 |
| Invalid votes | | 4 | 0.66 |
| Blank votes | | 4 | 0.66 |
| Total votes | | 608 | 100.00 |
| Registered voters/turnout | | 781 | 77.85 |

Uummannaq
| Candidate | Party | Votes | % |
|---|---|---|---|
| Elisabeth Johansen | Independent | 222 | 26.81 |
| Valdemar Petersen | Independent | 212 | 25.60 |
| Pavia Nielsen | Independent | 162 | 19.57 |
| Hans Zeeb | Independent | 157 | 18.96 |
| Uvdloriaq Løvstrøm | National Confederation of Trade Unions | 32 | 3.86 |
| Ib Regnar Overballe | Greenland Business Association | 22 | 2.66 |
| David Gbrielsen | Independent | 21 | 2.54 |
| Total | | 828 | 100.00 |
| Valid votes | | 828 | 96.39 |
| Invalid votes | | 24 | 2.79 |
| Blank votes | | 7 | 0.81 |
| Total votes | | 859 | 100.00 |
| Registered voters/turnout | | 1,060 | 81.04 |

== Aftermath ==
Marius Abelsen died in 1972 and was replaced by Jørgen Poulsen. Poulsen died in 1973 and was replaced by Hendrik Nielsen. Johan Knudsen also died in 1973 and was replaced by Lars Godtfredsen. In 1973 Mathæus Tobiassen replaced Ole Berglund.
