= 1975 Greenlandic Provincial Council election =

- 16 April 1975
- All 16 seats in the Provincial Council, plus compensatory seats
- Turnout: 66.84%
Party	Leader	Vote %	Seats	+/–
GAS	Odaq Olsen	9.31	1	+1
KNAPK	Lamik Møller	6.87	1	0
Independents	–	80.16	15	−1
This lists parties that won seats. See the complete results below.
Chairman before	Chairman after
Lars Chemnitz; Independent	Lars Chemnitz; Independent

Provincial Council elections were held in Greenland on 16 April 1975.

== Electoral system ==
Members of the Provincial Council were elected by first-past-the-post voting in 16 single-member constituencies. Political parties or lists were entitled to compensatory seats if they received more than one-sixteenth of the valid votes cast (6.25%).

== Results ==
KNAPK won a directly elected seat with Lamik Møller elected in Paamiut. As the National Confederation of Trade Unions also received over 6.25% of the vote, they were awarded a compensatory seat, taken by Odaq Olsen.

Party	Votes	%	Seats
National Confederation of Trade Unions	1,438	9.31	1
KNAPK	1,061	6.87	1
Arnat Peqatigiit Kattuffiat	410	2.65	0
Mikiki & Pedersen List	155	1.00	0
Independents	12,382	80.16	15
Total	15,446	100.00	17
Valid votes	15,446	95.16	
Invalid/blank votes	786	4.84	
Total votes	16,232	100.00	
Registered voters/turnout	24,286	66.84	
Source: Atuagagdliutit, Danmarks Statistik

=== Elected members ===
Constituency	Elected member
Aasiaat	Otto Steenholdt
Ammassalik	Anders Andreassen
Ittoqqortoormiit	Emil Arqe
Kangâtsiaq	Nikolaj Karlsen
Maniitsoq	Niels Carlo Heilmann
Nanortalik	Hendrik Nielsen
Narsaq	Lars Godtfredsen
Nuuk	Lars Chemnitz
Paamiut	Lamik Møller
Qaanaaq	Asiajuk Sadorana
Qaqortoq	Jonathan Motzfeldt
Qasigiannguit	Konrad Steenholdt
Qeqertarsuaq	Knud Kristiansen
Sisimiut	Jørgen C. F. Olsen
Upernavik	Bendt Frederiksen
Uummannaq	Severin Johansen
Supplementary seat	Odaq Olsen
Source: Kjœr Sørensen

== Aftermath ==
Severin Johansen was replaced by Hans Johansen during sessions between autumn 1976 and spring 1977.
