= Ruth Heilmann =

Greenlandic politician

Marie Margrethe Ruth Ane Thomsen Heilmann (born 6 April 1945) is a Greenlandic teacher and politician who represents the Siumut party. In January 2008, she became the first female speaker of the Inatsisartut or Parliament of Greenland. The Parliament honoured her in April 2016 with the Nersornaat (gold), a medal for meritorious service, for a political career lasting over 20 years.

== Biography ==
Born in 1945 in Arsuk, she was educated as a teacher and later moved into politics. In 1989, she became a member of the town council in Maniitsoq where she was elected mayor from 1997 to 2001.

As a member of the Siumut party, she was elected to the parliament in 1995 and represented Greenland on the Nordic Council. In December 2002, was Minister of Education, Church, Culture and Research, and shortly thereafter, in January 2003, Minister for Family and Health.

From January 2008 until June 2009, she was elected speaker of the Inatsisartut, becoming the first woman to hold the position. She replaced Jonathan Motzfeldt who had been involved in a sex scandal.

Heilmann has also been active in the church community, acting as the political head of Greenland's church from 2002 in her first ministerial appointment. On her appointment, she announced that more attention would be given to religion in education. She has been a keen church-goer and is an enthusiastic hymn singer.

Ruth Heilmann, who lost her husband some time ago, has five children. She has also been a handball coach and is co-founder of Greenland's Handball Association.

== Awards ==
In May 2016, Heilmann was honoured with the gold Nersornaat medal for over 20 years of service in Greenlandic politics. It was presented by Lars-Emil Johansen, the former Prime Minister of Greenland.
