= 1967 Greenlandic Provincial Council election =

- 28 April 1967
- All 16 seats in the Provincial Council (plus compensatory seats)
- Turnout: 61.98%
Party	Leader	Vote %	Seats	+/–
Inuit Party	Ulrik Rosing	6.76	1	New
Independents	–	86.14	16	0
This lists parties that won seats. See the complete results below.
Chairman before	Chairman after
Vacant	Erling Høegh; Independent

Provincial Council elections were held in Greenland on 28 April 1967.

== Electoral system ==
Members of the Provincial Council were elected by first-past-the-post voting in 16 single-member constituencies. Political parties or lists were entitled to compensatory seats if they received more than one-sixteenth of the valid votes cast (6.25%).

== Results ==
As the Inuit Party received more than 6.25% of the valid vote, they were entitled to a compensatory seat.

Party	Votes	%	Seats
Inuit Party	785	6.76	1
KNAPK	353	3.04	0
Johansen, Lynge, Olsen & Godtfredsen List	287	2.47	0
Mørch & Nielsen List	184	1.59	0
Independents	9,997	86.14	16
Total	11,606	100.00	17
Valid votes	11,606	97.67	
Invalid votes	182	1.53	
Blank votes	95	0.80	
Total votes	11,883	100.00	
Registered voters/turnout	19,184	61.94	
Source: Atuagagdliutit, Danmarks Statistik

=== By constituency ===
The initial results in Nuuk showed independent candidates Peter K. S. Heilmann receiving 672 votes, following by Inuit Party candidates Thomas Berthels and Kaj Narup with 313 and 293 respectively. Berthels was declared elected, as the Inuit Party candidate with the most votes. However, the result was challenged and a recount showed Heilmann with 700 votes, Narup with 326 and Berthels with 324, resulting in Narup replacing Berthels in the Provincial Council.

Aasiaat
Candidate	Party	Votes	%
Karl Skou	Independent	336	39.34
Hans Lynge	Independent	141	16.51
Peter Storch	Independent	116	13.58
Lars Møller	Independent	107	12.53
Anders Hove	Inuit Party	85	9.95
Adam Sandgreen	Independent	35	4.10
Hendrik Johansen	Johansen, Lynge, Olsen & Godtfredsen List	34	3.98
Total		854	100.00
Valid votes		854	97.16
Invalid votes		19	2.16
Blank votes		6	0.68
Total votes		879	100.00
Registered voters/turnout		1,337	65.74

Angmagssalik
Candidate	Party	Votes	%
Aron Davidsen	Independent	220	48.57
Hendrik Abelsen	Independent	156	34.44
Johannes Boassen	Independent	42	9.27
Harald Ignatiussen	Independent	35	7.73
Total		453	100.00
Valid votes		453	98.69
Invalid votes		5	1.09
Blank votes		1	0.22
Total votes		459	100.00
Registered voters/turnout		889	51.63

Ilulissat-Qasigiannguit
Candidate	Party	Votes	%
Lars Chemnitz	Independent	381	37.39
Hans Lennert	Independent	200	19.63
Jørgen Samuelsen	Independent	133	13.05
Frederik Jensen	Independent	124	12.17
Julius Olsvig	Independent	91	8.93
Otto Lange	Independent	90	8.83
Total		1,019	100.00
Valid votes		1,019	95.50
Invalid votes		31	2.91
Blank votes		17	1.59
Total votes		1,067	100.00
Registered voters/turnout		1,885	56.60

Kangaatsiaq
Candidate	Party	Votes	%
Edvard Reimer	Independent	134	37.33
Niels Siegstad	Independent	119	33.15
Nikola Karlsen	Independent	106	29.53
Total		359	100.00
Valid votes		359	96.77
Invalid votes		3	0.81
Blank votes		9	2.43
Total votes		371	100.00
Registered voters/turnout		465	79.78

Maniitsoq
Candidate	Party	Votes	%
Alibak Josefsen	Independent	465	49.10
Niels Carlo Heilmann	KNAPK	262	27.67
Ole Skifte	Independent	117	12.35
Jens Simonsen	Independent	103	10.88
Total		947	100.00
Valid votes		947	98.85
Invalid votes		11	1.15
Blank votes		0	0.00
Total votes		958	100.00
Registered voters/turnout		1,520	63.03

Nanortalik
Candidate	Party	Votes	%
Marius Abelsen	Independent	423	41.80
Otto Korneliussen	Independent	360	35.57
Jonathan Motzfeldt	Independent	145	14.33
Jakob Nielsen	Independent	84	8.30
Total		1,012	100.00
Valid votes		1,012	98.92
Invalid votes		7	0.68
Blank votes		4	0.39
Total votes		1,023	100.00
Registered voters/turnout		1,345	76.06

Narsaq
Candidate	Party	Votes	%
Erik Egede	Independent	410	65.92
Johan Knudsen	Independent	124	19.94
Lars Godtfredsen	Johansen, Lynge, Olsen & Godtfredsen List	88	14.15
Total		622	100.00
Valid votes		622	97.95
Invalid votes		9	1.42
Blank votes		4	0.63
Total votes		635	100.00
Registered voters/turnout		1,030	61.65

Nuuk
Candidate	Party	Votes	%
Peter K. S. Heilmann	Independent	700	40.00
Kaj Narup	Inuit Party	326	18.63
Thomas Berthels	Inuit Party	324	18.51
Ulrik Rosing	Independent	118	6.74
Laarseeraq Svendsen	Independent	98	5.60
Odaq Olsen	Johansen, Lynge, Olsen & Godtfredsen List	93	5.31
Hans Holm I	KNAPK	91	5.20
Total		1,750	100.00
Valid votes		1,750	97.33
Invalid votes		27	1.50
Blank votes		21	1.17
Total votes		1,798	100.00
Registered voters/turnout		3,189	56.38

Paamiut
Candidate	Party	Votes	%
Isboseth Petersen	Independent	162	26.26
Lars Petersen	Independent	141	22.85
Emanuel Berthelsen	Independent	117	18.96
John Eliassen	Independent	99	16.05
Nathan Jakobsen	Independent	98	15.88
Total		617	100.00
Valid votes		617	95.96
Invalid votes		15	2.33
Blank votes		11	1.71
Total votes		643	100.00
Registered voters/turnout		1,111	57.88

Qaqortoq
Candidate	Party	Votes	%
Erling Høegh	Independent	566	58.77
Mads Lynge	Independent	314	32.61
Hanning Høegh	Independent	57	5.92
Daniel Jensen	Inuit Party	26	2.70
Total		963	100.00
Valid votes		963	99.38
Invalid votes		3	0.31
Blank votes		3	0.31
Total votes		969	100.00
Registered voters/turnout		1,325	73.13

Qeqertarsuaq-Qullissat
Candidate	Party	Votes	%
David Broberg	Independent	322	49.92
Anda Nielsen	Independent	185	28.68
Ulrik Møller	Independent	95	14.73
Karl Møller	Independent	43	6.67
Total		645	100.00
Valid votes		645	97.73
Invalid votes		12	1.82
Blank votes		3	0.45
Total votes		660	100.00
Registered voters/turnout		988	66.80

Scoresbysund
Candidate	Party	Votes	%
Jakob Simonsen	Independent	56	42.75
Emil Aarqee	Independent	38	29.01
Kristian Qunaaq	Independent	37	28.24
Total		131	100.00
Valid votes		131	95.62
Invalid votes		3	2.19
Blank votes		3	2.19
Total votes		137	100.00
Registered voters/turnout		212	64.62

Sisimiut
Candidate	Party	Votes	%
Jørgen C. F. Olsen	Independent	597	75.57
Holger L. Poulsen	Independent	97	12.28
Jonas Lynge	Johansen, Lynge, Olsen & Godtfredsen List	72	9.11
Hans Thomsen	Inuit Party	24	3.04
Total		790	100.00
Valid votes		790	96.58
Invalid votes		19	2.32
Blank votes		9	1.10
Total votes		818	100.00
Registered voters/turnout		1,850	44.22

Thule
Candidate	Party	Votes	%
Qissunguaq Kristiansen	Independent	85	50.30
Peter Jensen	Independent	84	49.70
Total		169	100.00
Valid votes		169	98.26
Invalid votes		3	1.74
Blank votes		0	0.00
Total votes		172	100.00
Registered voters/turnout		278	61.87

Upernavik
Candidate	Party	Votes	%
Knud Kristiansen	Independent	338	60.57
Jørgen Nielsen	Mørch & Nielsen List	94	16.85
Peter Mørch	Mørch & Nielsen List	90	16.13
Rasmus Jørgensen	Independent	36	6.45
Total		558	100.00
Valid votes		558	98.41
Invalid votes		9	1.59
Blank votes		0	0.00
Total votes		567	100.00
Registered voters/turnout		793	71.50

Uummannaq
Candidate	Party	Votes	%
Elisabeth Johansen	Independent	278	38.77
Hans Zeeb	Independent	173	24.13
Jørgen Petersen	Independent	113	15.76
Hans Johansen	Independent	92	12.83
Vilhelm Olsen	Independent	61	8.51
Total		717	100.00
Valid votes		717	98.62
Invalid votes		6	0.83
Blank votes		4	0.55
Total votes		727	100.00
Registered voters/turnout		967	75.18

== Aftermath ==
Erik Egede died in 1967 and was replaced by Niels Holm. In 1968 Aron Davidsen was replaced by Erinarteq Jonathansen. In 1969 Kaj Narup was replaced by Peter Nielsen.
