= Guldborg Chemnitz =

Greenlandic interpreter (1919–2003)

- Born: Marie Guldborg Chemnitz; 27 January 1919; Qassimiut, Greenland
- Died: 2003 (aged 83–84)
- Occupations: Interpreter; politician; Women's rights advocate
- Spouse: Finn Christoffersen (m. 1942–1954)
- Children: 4
- Mother: Kathrine Chemnitz
- Relatives: Lars Chemnitz (brother)
- Family: Chemnitz family
- Awards: Order of the Dannebrog, 1987; Nersornaat, 1998

Marie Guldborg Chemnitz (27 January 1919 – 2003), known as Guldborg Chemnitz, was a Greenlandic interpreter, politician, and women's rights advocate.

== Early life and education ==
Marie Guldborg Chemnitz was born on 27 January 1919 in Qassimiut to Jørgen Niels Peter Chemnitz, an interpreter and member of the Greenland Provincial Council, and Kathrine Chemnitz, a women's rights activist, member of the Greenland Commission and a leading figure in the Union of Greenlandic Women's Associations (Note: Greenlandic: Kalaallit Nunaanni Arnat peqatigiit Kattuffiat; Danish: De Grønlandske Kvindeforeningers Sammenslutning.) (APK). The eldest of six children, Chemnitz was the elder sister of Jørgen Chemnitz, an interpreter and politician, and Lars Chemnitz, a politician. Chemnitz was a Greenlandic Inuk, and through her father was a member of the Greenlandic branch of the Chemnitz family.

In 1934, at the age of 15, she went to Denmark in order to learn Danish. Later returning to Greenland, from 1936 to 1938 Chemnitz studied at the girl's Efterskole in Aasiaat. Through the Committee for the Education of Greenlanders (Komitéen for Grønlænderinders Uddannelse) Chemnitz began studying at a teacher training college in Denmark. However, due to the threat of second world war Chemnitz returned to Greenland in 1939.

== Career ==
In 1948, Chemnitz was appointed as an interpreter to the Legal Expedition (Den juridiske ekspedition), a delegation of three Danish jurists sent by the Greenland Administration to investigate Greenland's legal culture and practices. Chemnitz also acted as a cultural mediator and research assistant for the jurists. Chemnitz later worked as an interpreter at the High Court of Greenland. From 1951 to 1954 Chemnitz was an elected official of the Nuuk municipal council. Chemnitz was elected again in 1983, under the Atassut party.

In 1964, Chemnitz passed the translator exam (Translatøreksamen), making her the first Greenlandic woman to do so. The same year Chemnitz settled in Copenhagen and worked as a translator at the Ministry of Greenland until 1968. Returning to Nuuk, Chemnitz continued her work as a translator at the Secretariat of the Greenland Council until 1972. During 1972 to 1975 Chemnitz was a translator at the Social Research Committee in Copenhagen. Chemnitz briefly worked as a consultant at APK during 1975 to 1976, before becoming the head of secretariat at the Greenland Education Association from 1976 to 1979. From 1979 to 1987, Chemnitz was an interpreter at the High Commissioner of Greenland.

Chemnitz was a chairman of the special Greenland Committee of the Danish Commission of the Status of Women in Society, and was a member of the Danish Equal Status Council. Chemnitz was associated with social research in Greenland and with aiding the understanding between Greenland and Denmark.

== Awards ==
In 1964, Chemnitz was awarded the Antonius Prize (Antoniusprisen) for her work to promote an understanding between Denmark and Greenland.

In 1987, Chemnitz was made a Knight of the Order of the Dannebrog and in 1998 was awarded the Nersornaat in silver.

== Personal life ==
On 7 June 1942 Chemnitz married Finn Christoffersen (1915–1990), a sheep farmer, before later divorcing in 1954. Chemnitz and Christoffersen had four children, the youngest of whom died in infancy.
