= Uummannaq Airport =

Uummannaq Airport may refer to:

- Uummannaq Heliport, in Uummannaq, Greenland
- Qaarsut Airport, also known as Uummannaq/Qaarsut Airport that serves Uummannaq and Qaarsut, Greenland
