= BGIA =

BGIA may refer to:

- Ikerasak Heliport by ICAO code
- Institute for Occupational Safety and Health of the German Social Accident Insurance
