= Niaqornat =

Settlement in Greenland, Kingdom of Denmark

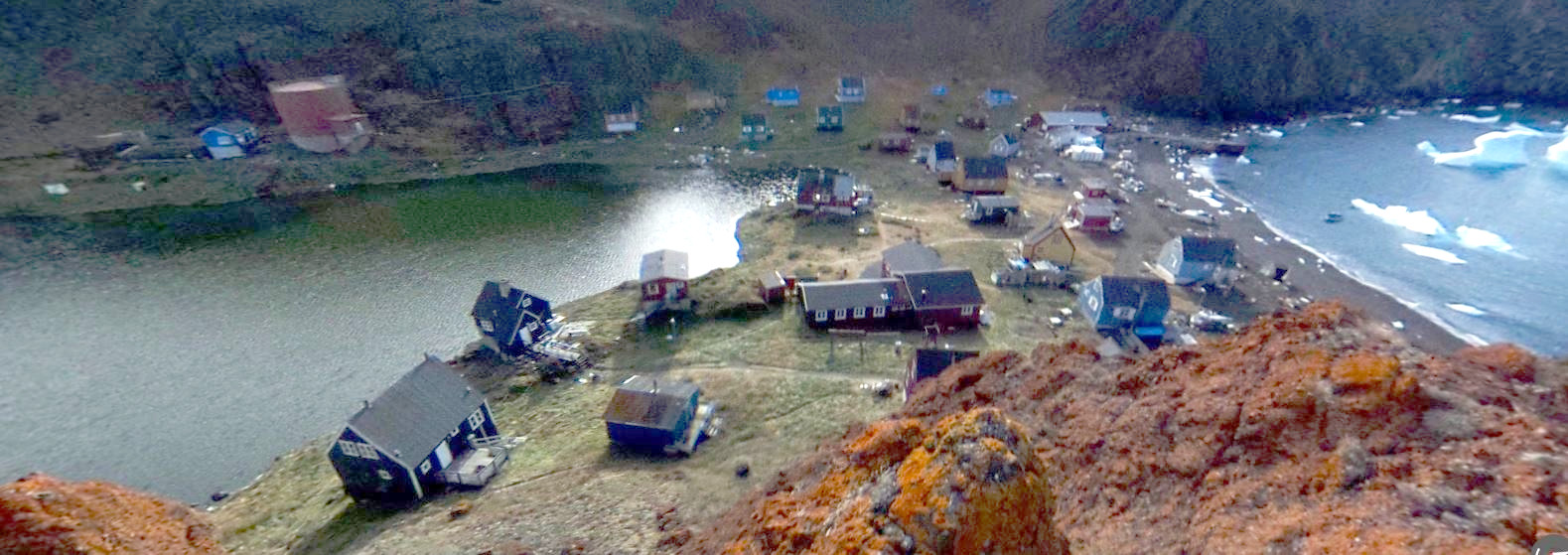

- Location within Greenland
- Coordinates: 70°47′20″N 53°39′50″W
- State: Kingdom of Denmark
- Constituent country: Greenland
- Municipality: Avannaata

Government
  - Mayor: Karl Kristian Kruse

Population (2025)
  - Total: 29
- Time zone: UTC−02:00 (Western Greenland Time)
  - Summer (DST): UTC−01:00 (Western Greenland Summer Time)
- Postal code: 3961 Uummannaq

Niaqornat (Kalaallisut: "head-shaped") is a settlement in the Avannaata municipality in northwestern Greenland. The settlement is located on the northern coast of the Nuussuaq Peninsula, with a wide view over Uummannaq Fjord. It had 39 inhabitants on 1 January 2024.

== Economy ==
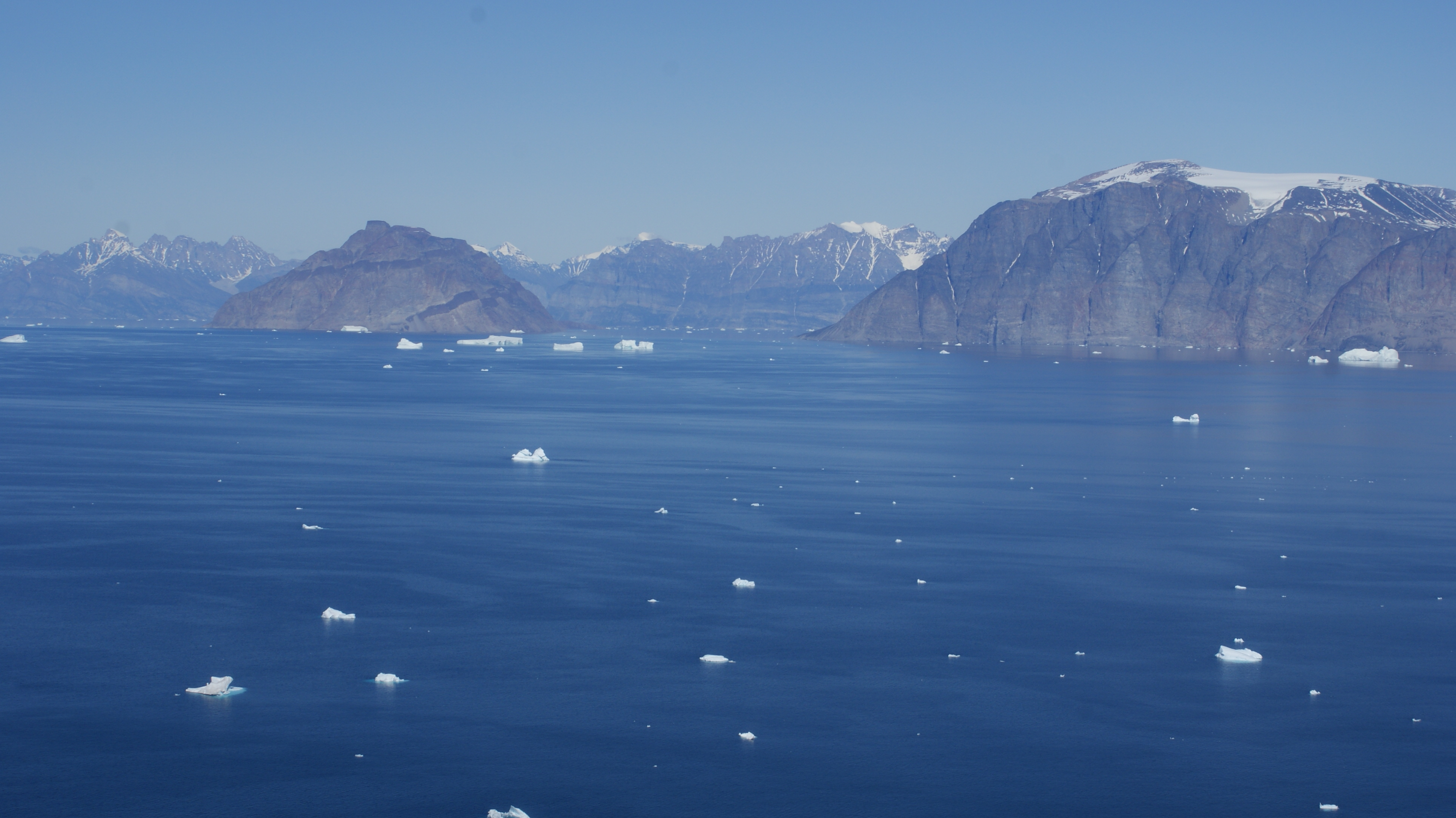
Aerial view of the central expanse of Uummannaq Fjord, with Salleq Island, Appat Island, and Perlerfiup Nunaa in the background

=== Fishing ===
Fishing is the mainstay of the economy, with stocks of Atlantic cod, Greenland halibut and Greenland shark. A variety of mammal species are harvested: ringed seal, bearded seal, harp seal, hooded seal, and walrus. There is a seasonal catch of narwhal and beluga – on rare occasions pilot whales are caught. Capelin and fin whales have been observed at Niaqornat as late as in November in recent years. Like other settlements in northwestern Greenland, Niaqornat experiences the effects of global warming.

=== Hunting ===
During spring a few polar bears are shot for meat. The catch includes caribou, Arctic hare, grouse and various seabirds. Niaqornat represents a traditional hunting culture where both dog sleds and small dinghies are used during the hunting of the marine resources. The settlement is well situated for studies of narwhal, beluga, polar bear as well as other marine resources such as the ringed seal. Niaqornat is an example of a well functioning small settlement in which the inhabitants still live from harvesting the local living resources and it represents a continuation in modern times of the Greenlandic hunting culture. A fish factory was closed, but reopened as a co-operative in 2011.

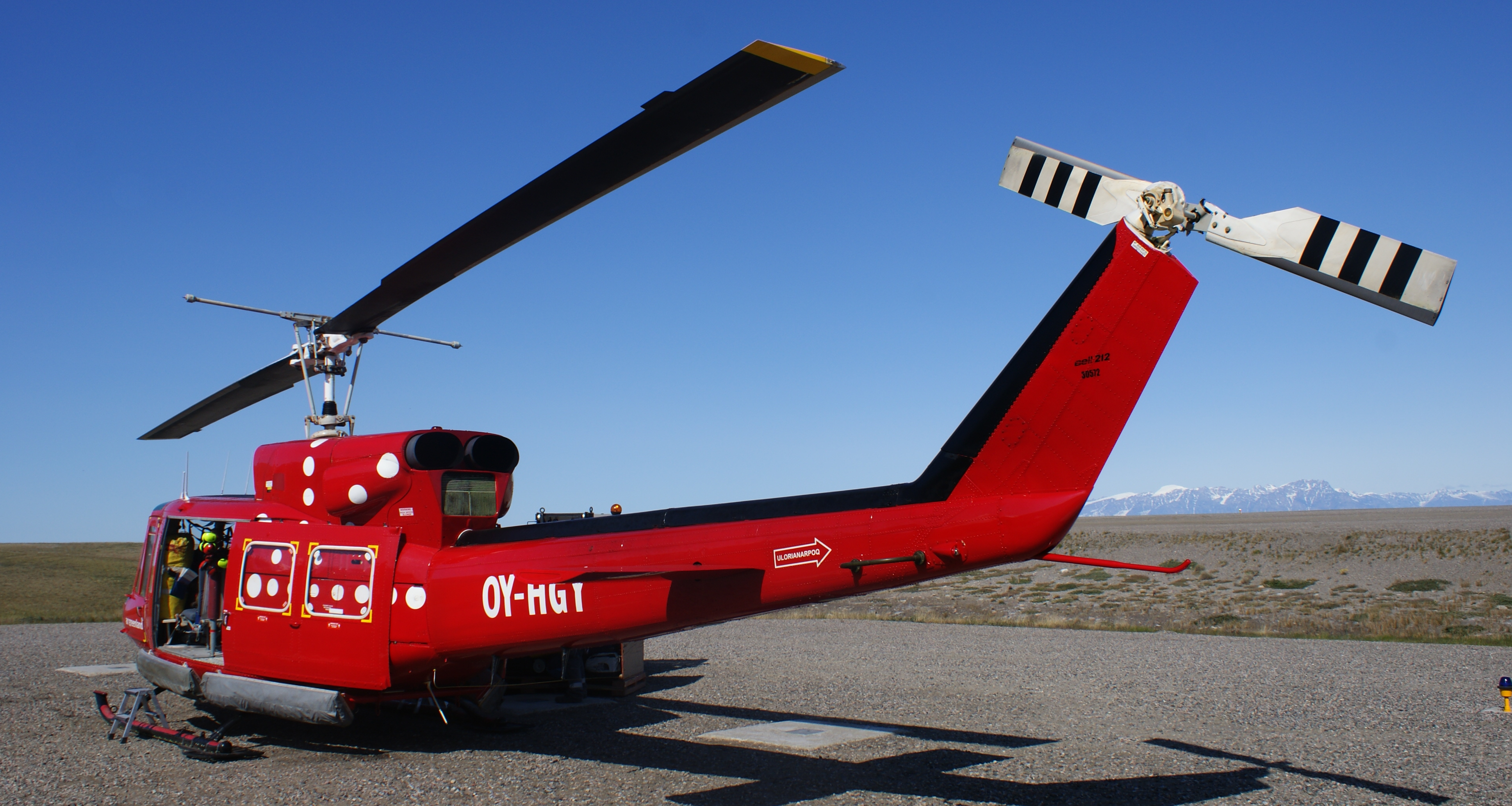
Air Greenland Bell 212 helicopter shuttling passengers between Niaqornat and Uummannaq

=== Infrastructure ===
Niaqornat only got electricity in 1988, however, the settlement is now able to communicate with the rest of the world via satellite and telephone and has access to the Internet. The settlement is in possession a 3 million litre water tank that supplies the settlement with fresh water from a lake in the mountain. There is also a community house where the inhabitants have access to a modern laundry and bath. The inhabitants have formed a local organisation that will work for attracting more tourists – especially from cruise ships. In 2007, the Greenland Institute of Natural Resources – which has its main office further south, in Nuuk, the capital of Greenland – established a field station in Niaqornat. In November 2007 there were nine pupils in the local school.

== Transport ==
Air Greenland serves the village as part of government contract, with mostly cargo helicopter flights from Niaqornat Heliport to the local hub in Uummannaq. There are no direct flights to Qaarsut Airport located in Qaarsut, a village 37 km southwest of Niaqornat on the same shore of Nuussuaq Peninsula. All passengers must therefore transfer in Uummannaq Heliport.

== Population ==
The population of Niaqornat has dropped by nearly a third relative to the 1990 levels, and by nearly a quarter relative to the 2000 levels, reflecting a general trend in the region. A November 2015 edition of National Geographic reported 50 inhabitants.

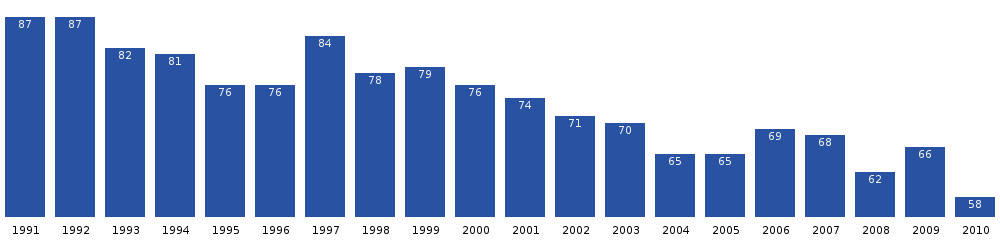
Niaqornat population growth dynamics in the last two decades. Source: Statistics Greenland

== Film ==
Filmmaker Sarah Gavron has documented the life of the hamlet in Village at the End of The World (released 2013)
