= List of speakers of the Inatsisartut =

Speaker of the Parliament of Greenland

- Flag of Greenland

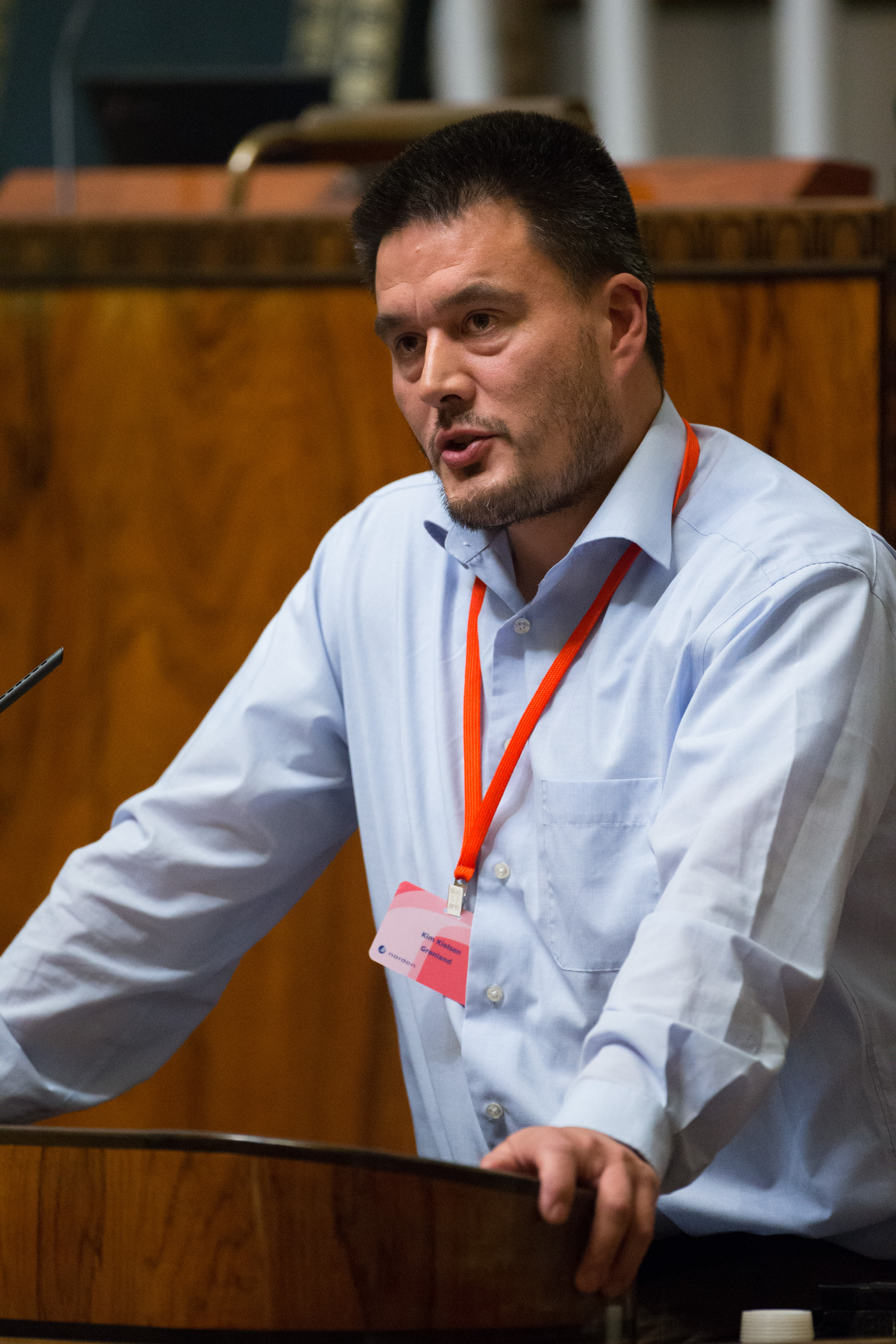
- Incumbent; Kim Kielsen since 7 April 2025
- Parliament of Greenland
- Style: Mister Speaker/Madam Speaker
- Reports to: Monarch of Denmark
- Residence: Inatsisartut
- Seat: Nuuk, Greenland
- Nominator: Prime Minister of Greenland
- Appointer: Elected by the Parliament
- Term length: One year
- Constituting instrument: Constitution of Denmark
- Precursor: Chairman of the Landsråd of Greenland
- Formation: 1979
- First holder: Jonathan Motzfeldt
- Website: inatsisartut.gl

The position of Speaker (Greenlandic: Siulittaasoq; Danish: Formand) of the Inatsisartut (the Greenlandic Parliament) was created in 1979. The preceding office was Chairman of the Landsråd of Greenland.

== List of speakers of the Greenlandic Parliament ==
Below is a list of office-holders:

#	Speaker of the Inatsisartut (Born-Died)	Term	Party	Notes
1.	Jonathan Motzfeldt (1938–2010)	1979–1988	Siumut	
2.	Lars Chemnitz (1925–2006)	1989–1991	Atassut	
3.	Bendt Frederiksen (1940–2012)	1991–1995	Siumut	
4.	Knud Sørensen (1935–2009)	1995–1997	Atassut	
5.	Jonathan Motzfeldt (1938–2010)	1997	Siumut	
6.	Anders Andreassen (1944–)	1997–1999	Siumut	
7.	Johan Lund Olsen (1958–)	1999	Inuit Ataqatigiit	
8.	Ole Lynge (1956–)	1999–2001	Inuit Ataqatigiit	
9.	Daniel Skifte (1936–2020)	2001–2002	Atassut	
10.	Jonathan Motzfeldt (1938–2010)	2002–2008	Siumut	
11.	Ruth Heilmann (1945–)	2008–2009	Siumut	
12.	Josef Motzfeldt (1941–)	2009–2013	Inuit Ataqatigiit	
13.	Lars Emil Johansen (1946–)	2013–2018	Siumut	
14.	Hans Enoksen (1956–2025)	2018	Naleraq	
15.	Vivian Motzfeldt (1972–)	2018–2021	Siumut	
16.	Hans Enoksen (1956–2025)	2021–2022	Naleraq	
17.	Kim Kielsen (1966–)	2022–2023	Siumut	
18.	Mimi Karlsen (1957–)	2023–2025	Inuit Ataqatigiit	
19.	Kim Kielsen (1966–)	2025–present	Siumut	
