= UMD =

UMD may refer to:

== Education ==
- University of Maryland, College Park, US
- University of Massachusetts Dartmouth, US
- University of Michigan–Dearborn, US
- University of Minnesota Duluth, US

== Other uses ==
- Union for Multiparty Democracy, a political party in Tanzania
- Universal Media Disc, an optical disc format
- Uummannaq Heliport, Greenland, IATA code
