= Kathrine Chemnitz =

Greenlandic politician (1894–1978)

- Born: Vilhelmine Else Kathrine Dorthe Josefsen; 28 July 1894; Qaqortoq, Greenland
- Died: 1 December 1978 (aged 84); Nuuk, Greenland
- Spouse: Jørgen Niels Peter Chemnitz (m. 1917; died 1956)
- Children: 6, including Guldborg Chemnitz; Lars Chemnitz
- Awards: Royal Medal of Recompense, 1950

Vilhelmine Else Kathrine Dorthe Chemnitz (née Josefsen; 28 June 1894 – 1 December 1978), known as Kathrine Chemnitz, was a Greenlandic politician, and a champion of Greenlandic women's education.

== Biography ==
Chemnitz's parents were Kanuthus Josefsen and Juliane Kielsen. Early in 1900, there were no educational opportunities for women in Greenland. She therefore got a job as a maid, with a Danish family. She traveled to Denmark with this family, where they tried to enroll her in school, but Chemnitz was rejected on the grounds that she would not be respected in Denmark. As a result of this refusal, Chemnitz later became a champion of Greenlandic women's education. Chemnitz married into an influential and well-educated family. This gave her an opportunity to help establish the first women's association in Greenland in Nuuk in 1948.

Chemnitz was president of the new organization, and she later established several local women's associations, which were combined into a national organization in 1960 with her as the chair. This association was called The Greenland Women Societies Association (APK – Kalaallit Nunaanni Arnat Illuat Kattuffiat). In 1948, she became a member of the Greenland Commission, as the only Greenlandic woman. Here she had jobs in several committees and with others, secured the establishment of schools in Qaqortoq and Aasiaat. When her position ended in 1950, she was awarded the Royal Medal of Recompense in gold.

== Personal life ==
On 25 August 1917 Chemnitz married Jørgen Niels Peter Chemnitz, an interpreter and member of the Greenland Provincial Council, with whom she had six children. Chemnitz's children include Guldborg Chemnitz, an interpreter, politician, and women's rights advocate, Jørgen Chemnitz an interpreter and politician, and Lars Chemnitz, a politician.

On 1 December 1978 Chemnitz died in Nuuk, aged 84.

== Legacy ==
In 1998 Greenals issued a commemorative postage stamp bearing Chemnitz's picture and celebrating 50 years since the formation of the first women's society in Greenland.
