= Uusarqak Qujaukitsoq =

Greenlandic politician

Uusarqak Qujaukitsoq MMS

Member of Inatsisartut
- In office 1984–1995

Personal details
- Born: 10 February 1948 North Greenland
- Died: 2 August 2018 (aged 70) Greenland, Kingdom of Denmark
- Citizenship: Kingdom of Denmark
- Spouse: Inger Kristiansen (m.1970–2018, his death)
- Children: Vittus Qujaukitsoq

Uusarqak Qujaukitsoq (Older spelling: Ûssarĸak Kʼujaukitsoĸ; Greenlandic pronunciation: [uːsɑqːak qujaːkitsːɔq]; 10 February 1948 – 2 August 2018) was a Greenlandic politician for Siumut party.

Uusarqak Qujaukitsoq was the son of Kʼujaukitsoĸ Kʼujaukitsoĸ and his wife Eĸilana. His grandfather was Inukitsupaluk Kʼujaukitsoĸ (1890-1967), who participated in expeditions by Robert Edwin Peary, Knud Rasmussen and Lauge Koch and was the son of K'ujaukitsoĸ and his wife Aimainalik. On 15 February 1970, he married the economist Inger Kristiansen and the couple had one son Vittus Qujaukitsoq, who had been Greenland Minister of Finance (2013–2014) and of Business, Labor, Trade and Foreign Affairs (2014–2017).

Uusarqak Qujaukitsoq went to school in Qaanaaq and was trained as a salesman in Aasiaat in 1964. In 1966 he left Greenland to visit the commercial school in Ikast, Denmark. After a year he returned to Aasiaat, then to Qaanaaq, where he finally worked as a warehouse manager. He witnessed the crash of a B-52 near Thule Air Base in 1968 at a close range, which became his life-defining political issue along with the 1953 American expulsion from his birthplace for the construction of Thule Air Base. In 1971 he was first elected to the council of the community Qaanaaq, where he sat for many years, partly as vice mayor. From 1984 to 1995 he sat in Inatsisartut.

Uusarqak Qujaukitsoq was the chairman of the interest group "Hingitaq 53 for the rights of Inughuit", expelled in 1953. He filmed the 2003 film Aulahuliat, which reproduces images of the dispute between Inughuit and Americans and was shown in 2012 in Berlin at the premiere of the film festival Greenland Eyes. For his decades of service, he received the Nersornaat in silver on 9 August 2016.
