= Nuugaatsiaq =

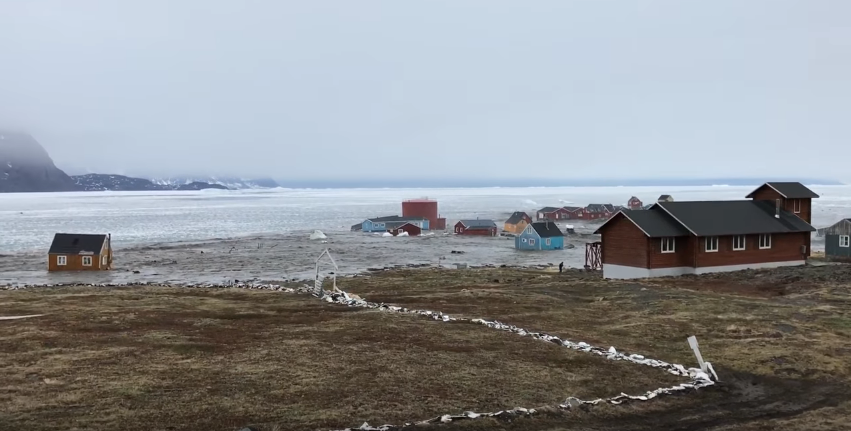
- Damage to Nuugaatsiaq during the 2017 tsunami

- Location within Greenland
- Coordinates: 71°32′06″N 53°12′45″W
- State: Kingdom of Denmark
- Constituent country: Greenland
- Municipality: Avannaata

Population (2020)
  - Total: 0
- Time zone: UTC-03
- Postal code: 3961 Uummannaq

Nuugaatsiaq (old spelling: Nûgâtsiaq) is a now abandoned settlement in the Avannaata municipality, in northwestern Greenland, located on an island off the southern coast of Sigguup Nunaa peninsula, in the Uummannaq Fjord basin. It had 84 inhabitants in 2010, but was abandoned after a tsunami struck in 2017.

== History ==
=== 2017 tsunami ===
On 17 June 2017, a landslide measuring 300 m × 1,100 m (980 ft × 3,610 ft) fell about 1,000 m (3,280 ft) into Karrat Fjord, generating a megatsunami. Initially it was unclear if the landslide was caused by a small earthquake (magnitude 4), but it was later confirmed that the landslide had caused the tremors.

The tsunami had an initial height of 90 to 100 m (295 to 328 ft), but it was significantly lower once it hit Nuugaatsiaq, where it had a run-up height of 9 metres (30 ft). Four inhabitants were killed and nine were injured, and eleven buildings were washed into the water.

An evacuation of 170 residents of Nuugaatsiaq and Illorsuit followed because of a danger of additional landslides and waves. As of March 2023, both Nuugaatsiaq and lllorsuit remained abandoned due to the continuing threat of landslide-generated tsunamis.

== Transport ==
Prior to Nuugaatsiaq's abandonment, Air Greenland served the village as part of a government contract, with mostly cargo helicopter flights from Nuugaatsiaq Heliport to Illorsuit and Uummannaq.

Royal Arctic Line also served the village by ship before its evacuation. This sea link connected Nuugaatsiaq and other villages on Uummannaq Fjord to Aasiaat.

== Infrastructure ==
Before the village's abandonment, Atuarfik Saamu folk school accommodated approximately 12 students ranging from the first to the ninth grade. Established in 1991, the school had a total capacity of 125 seats.

The village offered essential amenities before it was abandoned, including a shop, post office, service center, nursing station, church, community center, and a procurement center with halibut-processing facilities. The village's cemetery is positioned overlooking hunting grounds as a tribute to the deceased.

== Population ==
Prior to Nuugaatsiaq's abandonment after the 2017 tsunami, its population had dropped by over 16 percent relative to the 2000 levels, reflecting a general trend in the region. A November 2015 edition of National Geographic reported about 80 inhabitants, with many houses in the village empty.

In the past, people lived mainly by catching seals and fishing for catfish, but fishing for halibut became more common in recent times.

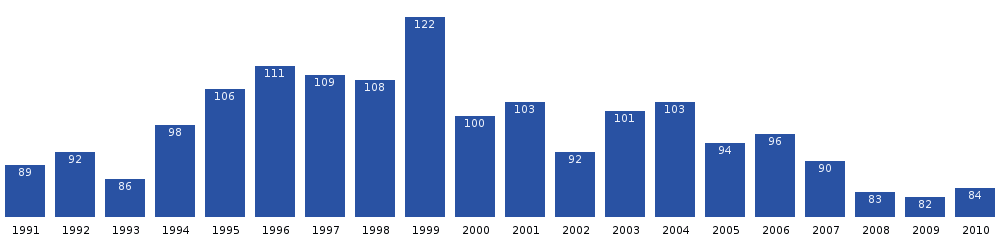
Nuugaatsiaq population growth dynamics in the last two decades. Source: Statistics Greenland
