= Illorsuit =

- Location within Greenland
- Coordinates: 71°14′30″N 53°34′00″W
- Sovereign state: Kingdom of Denmark
- Autonomous country: Greenland
- Municipality: Avannaata

Population (2020)
  - Total: 0
- Time zone: UTC-03
- Postal code: 3961 Uummannaq

Illorsuit (Greenlandic pronunciation: [iɬːɔsːuit]; old spelling: Igdlorssuit) is a former settlement in Avannaata municipality, in western Greenland. Located on the northeastern shore of Illorsuit Island − northwest of Uummannaq at the mouth of the Uummannaq Fjord − the settlement had 91 inhabitants in 2010. It was abandoned in 2018.

== History ==
On 17 June 2017, a landslide measuring 300 m × 1,100 m (980 ft × 3,610 ft) fell about 1,000 m (3,280 ft) into Karrat Fjord, generating a megatsunami that hit Nuugaatsiaq.

Initially it was unclear if the landslide was caused by a small earthquake (magnitude 4), but later it was confirmed that the landslide had caused the tremors. The tsunami had an initial height of 90 to 100 m (295 to 328 ft), but it was significantly lower once it hit Nuugaatsiaq, where it had a run-up height of 9 metres (30 ft).

Four people were killed and nine were injured at Nuugaatsiaq, and eleven buildings were washed into the water. Illorsuit also suffered tsunami damage. An evacuation of 170 residents of Illorsuit and Nuugaatsiaq followed because of a danger of additional landslides and waves.

Illorsuit was abandoned in 2018, and as of March 2023, both llorsuit and Nuugaatsiaq remained uninhabited due to the continuing threat of landslide-generated tsunamis.

== Transport ==
Prior to Illorsuit′s abandonment, Air Greenland served the village as part of government contract, with mostly cargo helicopter flights from Illorsuit Heliport to Nuugaatsiaq and Uummannaq.

== Population ==
Before Illorsuit's abandonment, its population had dropped by 28 percent relative to the 1990 levels and by nearly 17 percent relative to the 2000 levels, reflecting a general trend in the region.

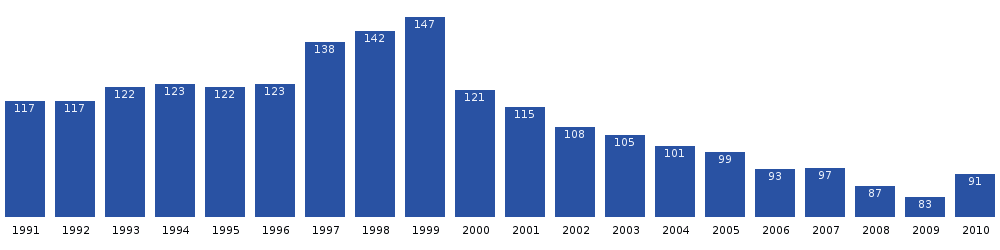
Illorsuit population growth dynamics in the last two decades. Source: Statistics Greenland

== Notable people ==
- Lars Emil Johansen (b. 1946), the second Prime Minister of Greenland
- Rockwell Kent (1882–1971), American artist who spent time in Illorsuit
