= Ikerasak Heliport =

Heliport in Greenland

- IATA: IKE; ICAO: BGIA; LID: IKE

Summary
- Airport type: Public
- Operator: Greenland Airport Authority (Mittarfeqarfiit)
- Serves: Ikerasak, Greenland
- Elevation AMSL: 66 ft / 20 m
- Coordinates: 70°29′53″N 051°18′11″W
- Website: Ikerasak Heliport

Map
- Location in Greenland

Helipads
Number	Length		Surface
Number	m	ft	Surface
1	15	49	Gravel
- Source: Danish AIS

Ikerasak Heliport (IATA: IKE, ICAO: BGIA) is a heliport in Ikerasak, a village on an island of the same name in the Uummannaq Fjord system in Avannaata municipality in northwestern Greenland. The heliport is considered a helistop, and is served by Air Greenland as part of government contract.

== Airlines and destinations ==
Airlines	Destinations
Air Greenland (settlement flights)	Saattut, Uummannaq

Air Greenland operates government contract flights to villages in the Uummannaq Fjord region. These mostly cargo flights are not featured in the timetable, although they can be pre-booked. Departure times for these flights as specified during booking are by definition approximate, with the settlement service optimized on the fly depending on local demand for a given day.
