= List of chairmen of the Landsråd of Greenland =

List of chairmen of the Landsråd of Greenland.

The Landsråd was created in 1951.

This is a list of chairmen of the Landsråd:

Name	Entered office	Left office
Poul H. Lundsteen (Governor of Greenland)	1951	September 1, 1960
Finn C. Nielsen (Governor of Greenland)	September 1, 1960	June 1, 1963
Niels O. Christensen (Governor of Greenland)	June 1, 1963	1967
Erling Høegh	1967	1971
Lars Chemnitz	1971	1979

== Sources ==
- Rulers.org
- Guided Tour of Inatsisartut
