= Greenland Commission =

The Commission photographed in Denmark, in 1949. Front row: Ersk Brun, second from left; Hans Heinrich Koch, fourth from left; Kathrine Chemnitz, fourth from right.

The Greenland Commission (Danish: Grønlandskommissionen) operated between 1948 and 1950. It established the locally elected Provincial Council of Greenland and began the move towards home rule among the island's Danish settlers and Inuit natives.
