= Hendrik Nielsen =

Greenlandic politician (1942–2022)

Member of the Inatsisartut
- In office 1979–1991

Member of the Greenland Provincial Council
- In office 1974–1979

Personal details
- Born: 1 June 1942 Saarloq, Greenland, German-occupied Denmark
- Died: 4 September 2022 (aged 80)
- Party: Siumut
- Occupation: Fisherman

Hendrik Nielsen (1 June 1942 – 4 September 2022) was a Greenlandic politician. A member of Siumut, he served on the Greenland Provincial Council from 1974 to 1979 and its successor, the Inatsisartut, from 1979 to 1991.

Nielsen died on 4 September 2022, at the age of 80.
