= Lars Chemnitz =

Greenlandic politician (1925–2006)

Speaker of the Inatsisartut
- In office 1988–1991
- Preceded by: Jonathan Motzfeldt
- Succeeded by: Bendt Frederiksen

Chairman of the Landsråd
- In office 1971–1979
- Preceded by: Erling Høegh
- Succeeded by: Position abolished

Personal details
- Born: 26 October 1925 Godthåb, Greenland
- Died: 18 November 2006 (aged 81) Denmark
- Party: Atassut
- Spouse: Annie Westergaard (m. 1958)
- Parent: Kathrine Chemnitz (mother)
- Relatives: Guldborg Chemnitz (sister)
- Education: Godthåb Seminarium
- Profession: Teacher

Lars Hans Jens Josva Chemnitz (26 October 1925 – 18 November 2006) was a Greenlandic politician who served as chairman of the Landsråd from 1971 to 1979 and later as the speaker of the Inatsisartut from 1988 to 1991.

== Early life ==
Chemnitz was born on 26 October 1925 in Godthåb (present-day Nuuk) to Jørgen Niels Peter Chemnitz, an interpreter and member of the Greenland Provincial Council, and Kathrine Chemnitz, a women's rights activist, member of the Greenland Commission and a leading figure in the Union of Greenlandic Women's Associations (Note: Greenlandic: Kalaallit Nunaanni Arnat peqatigiit Kattuffiat; Danish: De Grønlandske Kvindeforeningers Sammenslutning.) (APK). One of six children, Chemnitz was the brother of Jørgen Chemnitz, an interpreter and politician, and Guldborg Chemnitz, a interpreter, politician, and women's rights advocate Chemnitz was a Greenlandic Inuk, and through his father was a member of the Greenlandic branch of the Chemnitz family.

In 1946, Chemnitz earnt his teacher's degree from Godthåb Seminarium. Chemnitz later settled in Haslev, Denmark, where he continued his education until 1952.

== Career ==
After his education, Chemnitz became a teacher, working in Haslev from 1952 to 1953, in Hornbæk from 1953 to 1955, in Helsinge from 1955 to 1957 and in Sønderborg from 1957 to 1958. He returned to Nuuk in 1958 and began teaching there that year. He became the deputy school inspector of Julianehåb (now Qaqortoq) in 1960.

Chemnitz later studied for a year at a Danish teacher's college before coming back to Greenland, serving as the head of the school district in Thule (now Qaanaaq) from 1964 to 1966, before then moving to Ilulissat where he became the school inspector. He was the head of the Greenland Efterskole in Holstebro, Denmark, from 1968 to 1969, before moving back to his position at Ilulissat, where he served until 1971.

== Political career ==
In 1967, Chemnitz entered politics, running for election and winning a seat in Greenland's provincial legislature, the Landsråd (Greenland Provincial Council), from Ilulissat. One year later, he ran in the 1968 Danish general election to be one of two Greenland members of the Folketing, Denmark's parliament, although he ended up losing the election to Knud Hertling. In 1971, he was elected the chairman of the Landsråd. In his position as chairman of the council, he became the head of Greenland's government and was described as "Greenland's closest equivalent to a Prime Minister." He was re-elected to the council in 1975 representing Godthåb.

Chemnitz led Greenland amid negotiations with the Danish government for home rule. He was a member of Greenland's Commission on Home Rule and helped the country achieve it with the passage of the Home Rule Act in May 1979. A new legislature, the Inatsisartut, was established, and Queen Margrethe II attended a ceremony marking its opening, where she gave Chemnitz an original copy of the Home Rule Act. At the ceremony, he told her that "We will treasure it as a national heirloom, you can rest assured that it will be well looked after."

Although in favor of home rule, Chemnitz was seen as a moderate, with Dansk Biografisk Leksikon noting that he "sought to maintain close cooperation with Denmark and worked for a cautious transition to home rule." In 1979, he was the founder of the social-democratic political party Atassut, for which he served as national chairman for from 1979 to 1984.

Chemnitz was elected a member of the Inatsisartut in 1979 and became the leader of the opposition. At age 53, he was the oldest member of the legislature elected. He then defended his seat in the 1983 elections. In 1984, he ran for election to the Danish Folketing but lost to Otto Steenholdt, and subsequently announced his retirement from politics. Steenholdt then became the leader of Chemnitz's party. From 1985 to 1986, he worked as an advisor for Greenlandic affairs in the Danish Ministry of Foreign Affairs, and was then head of human resources development for The BANK of Greenland from 1986 to 1988.

Chemintz announced a return to politics in 1988 and was elected to the Inatsisartut, being the oldest elected member at age 61. He became known as the "Grand Old Man" of Greenlandic opposition. Although no longer the leader of his party, he continued to maintain a major influence on it. In November 1988, the office of speaker of the Inatsisartut was created (previously the person in the position of prime minister presided over the Inatsisartut) and Chemnitz was elected to the position. He remained in that role until 1991. Although no longer speaker following 1991, he remained in the legislature as he was successful in winning re-election that year. In 1994, he launched another unsuccessful campaign for the Danish Folketing but was defeated by Steenholdt once more. He declined to run for re-election to the Inatsisartut in 1995 and retired from politics at the age of 69.

During his political career, Chemnitz was named to several other offices as well. He was a member of the executive council of the Inuit Circumpolar Conference (ICC) from 1980 to 1986 and chaired the Greenlandic Society organization from 1985 to 1987. He was also on the supervisory board for the newspaper Atuagagdliutit/Grønlandsposten.

Chemnitz was knighted in the Order of the Dannebrog in 1971. He was knighted in the 1st degree in 1978 and later made commander. In 1989, he was awarded the Nersornaat in gold, Greenland's highest honor, being, along with Jonathan Motzfeldt, the first recipient of the award.

== Personal life and death ==
Chemnitz married Danish nurse Annie Westergaard in May 1958. He moved to Denmark with his wife permanently in the 1990s. He died on 18 November 2006, at the age of 81, after a long illness.
