= Nersornaat =

Award in Greenland

Nersornaat Greenland Medal for Meritorious Service
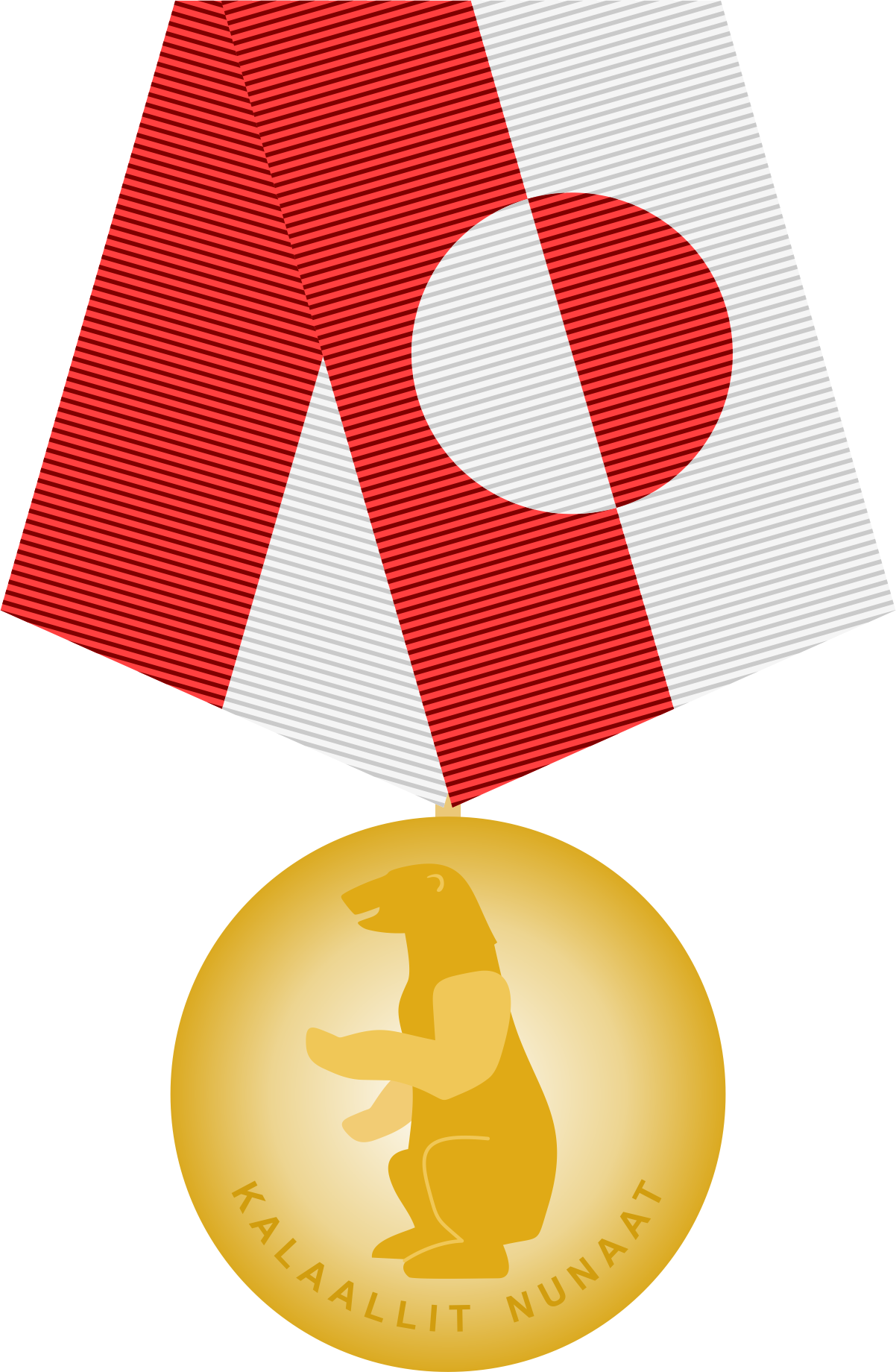
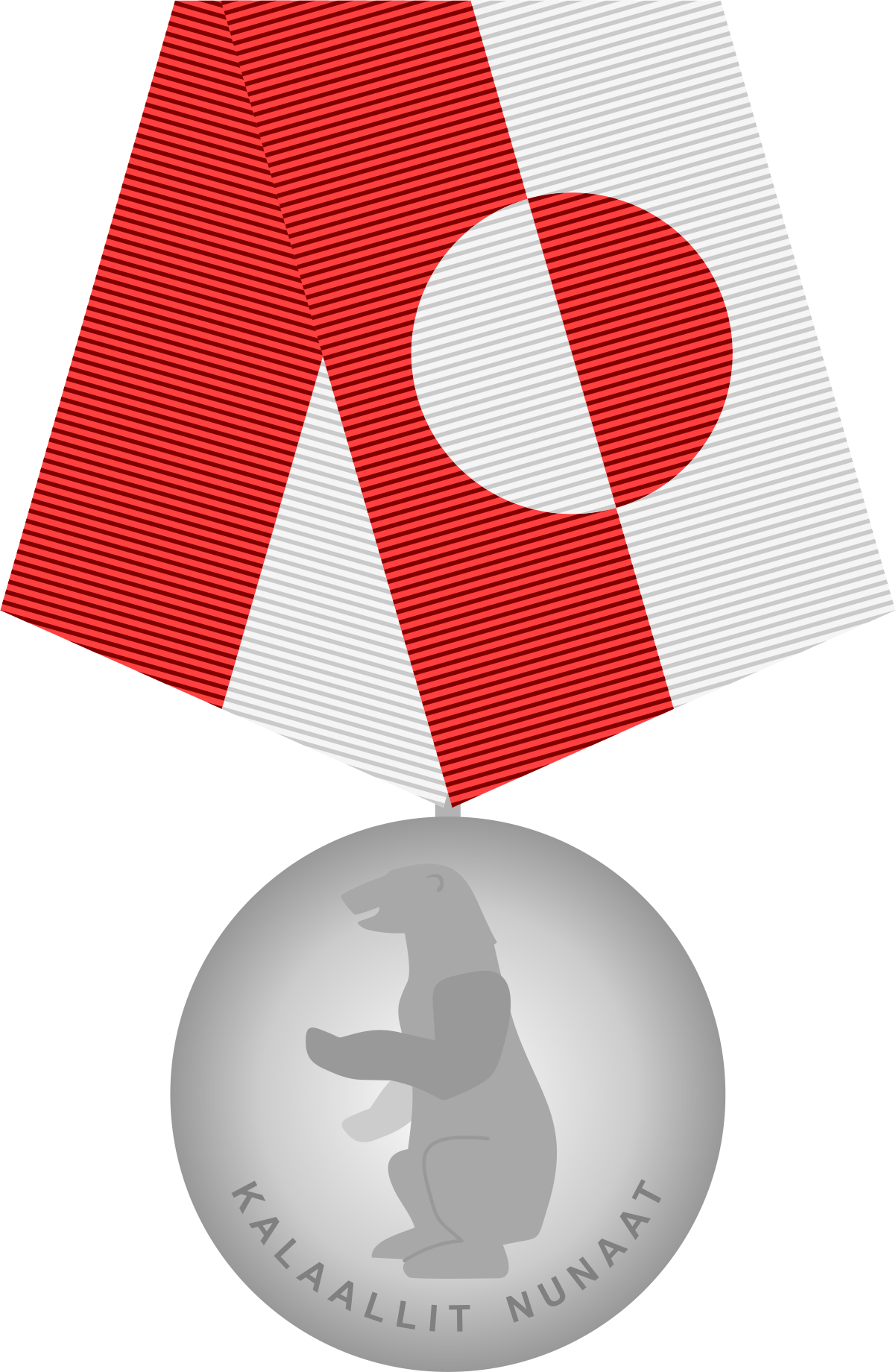
- Nersonaat in Gold and Silver
- Awarded for: Meritorious service to Greenland in the field of public service, business, art, or science.
- Country: Kingdom of Denmark
- Presented by: Greenland Home Rule Government
- Post-nominals: Grøn.Hjst.M.
- Established: 1 May 1989
- Ribbon bar of the Medal

Greenland Medal for Meritorious Service (Greenlandic: Nersornaat, lit. 'Deserved'; Danish: Grønlands Hjemmestyres Fortjenstmedalje), is awarded by the Greenland Home Rule government. It is the highest award based in Greenland. The medal was instituted on 1 May 1989 in connection with the ten-year anniversary of the Greenlandic home rule. The medal is awarded for meritorious service for Greenland in fields such as public service, business, art, or science. The medal is worn in a ribbon of the Greenlandic colours; red symbolising the sun and white symbolising the snow. The medal is awarded in two grades: gold and silver.

== Notable recipients ==
- Jonathan Motzfeldt gold
- Margrethe II of Denmark gold
- Poul Schlüter gold
- Lars-Emil Johansen gold
- Uffe Ellemann-Jensen gold
- Henrik, Prince Consort of Denmark gold
- Frederik X of Denmark gold
- Mary, Queen Consort of Denmark gold
- Per Stig Møller gold
- Hans Enoksen gold
- Prince Takamado of Japan gold
- Eigil Knuth gold
- Friis Arne Petersen gold
- Ûssarĸak K'ujaukitsoĸ silver
- Mary Simon, Governor General of Canada, gold
- Lars Chemnitz gold
- Guldborg Chemnitz, silver

== See also ==
- List of orders, decorations, and medals of the Kingdom of Denmark
