= National Confederation of Trade Unions of Greenland =

SIK
- National Confederation of Trade Unions of Greenland
- Sulinermik Inuussutissarsiuteqartut Kattuffiat
- Founded: 2 July 1956
- Headquarters: Nuuk, Greenland
- Location: Greenland
- Members: More than 10.000 (2010)
- Key people: President Jess G. Berthelsen
- Affiliations: NFS
- Website: sik.gl in English

The National Confederation of Trade Unions of Greenland (Greenlandic: Sulinermik Inuussutissarsiuteqartut Kattuffiat or simply SIK) is an organization that was originally founded on 2 July 1956, as the Kalaallit Nunaanni Sulisartut Kattuffiat (and long known by its Danish initials, GAS), and is the national trade union federation of Greenland that was established in Nuuk as an amalgamation of 13 local unions.

== History ==
The organization was founded on July 2, 1956, in Nuuk under the name Kalaallit Nunaanni Sulisartut Kattuffiat ("Greenland Workers' Union") as an amalgamation of 13 local workers' unions. The Danish trade unionist and politician Carl Peter Jensen had already supported the union's work. In its early decades, the union operated under the Danish name Grønlands Arbejder Sammenslutning (GAS) ("Greenland Workers' Union"). GAS secured collective bargaining agreements that, among other things, ensured equal pay for men and women. The union also created social welfare programs, established the Sulisartut Højskoliat (a vocational school) for workers, and founded the SISA pension fund. Furthermore, it achieved equal pay for Greenlanders and Danes in Greenland.

In the 1971 and 1975 National Council elections, the Trade Union Federation was one of the associations that ran a list of candidates in the pre-political era. In the latter election, Ôdâĸ Olsen won a seat on the National Council. In 1978, the Federation's name was changed to the Greenlandic Sulinermik Inuussutissarsiuteqartut Kattuffiat (roughly "Association of those who earn their living through (wage) labor"). Several parties were formed before the introduction of the Hjemmestyre (National Council) in 1979. The social-democratic Siumut party offered the Trade Union Federation cooperation, but the Federation declined to work with any particular party. Instead, in February 1979, it founded its own party, the Sulisartut Partiiat ("Workers' Party"). This party failed to win enough votes in the 1979 parliamentary elections and was subsequently dissolved in 1982.

In 2002, the organization had around 9,000 members, representing about a quarter of the working-age population. They are organized into approximately 19 local branches.
