= Lars-Emil Johansen =

Prime Minister of Greenland from 1991 to 1997

President of the West Nordic Council
- In office 2015–2016
- Preceded by: Bill Justinussen
- Succeeded by: Bryndís Haraldsdóttir

Prime Minister of Greenland
- In office 18 March 1991 – 19 September 1997
- Monarch: Margrethe II
- Preceded by: Jonathan Motzfeldt
- Succeeded by: Jonathan Motzfeldt

Personal details
- Born: 24 September 1946 (age 79) Igdlorssuit, North Greenland
- Party: Siumut

Lars-Emil Johansen (born 24 September 1946) is a Greenlandic politician who served as the second prime minister of Greenland from 1991 to 1997, and Speaker of the Inatsisartut from 2013 to 2018.

Johansen was chairman of the political party Siumut (Forward) between 1987 and 1997, seated in the Landsting from its creation in 1979. Prior to the creation of the Landsting, he represented Greenland in the Parliament of Denmark from 1973, a position he regained in 2001 and held until 2011. He was also President of the West Nordic Council from 2015 to 2016.

== Early life ==
He was born in Illorsuit, a small settlement near Uummannaq in the Qaasuitsup municipality, as son of commercial agent Kristian Johansen and district midwife Elisabeth Johansen; his mother had been the first female country council member from 1959 to 1975.

In 1970, Johansen finished his education as a teacher, and the following year he was elected for the Greenland country council, the most powerful local authority in Greenland prior to the creation of the Landsting.

He has been appointed a Commander of the Danish Order of the Dannebrog and the Royal Norwegian Order of Merit, as well as two types of the Nersornaat, the silver Nersornaat and the golden Nersornaat (the Greenland Medal for Meritorious Service).

Order of Dannebrog, Knight Commander of the Norwegian Star.
