= Uummannaq Heliport =

Heliport in Greenland

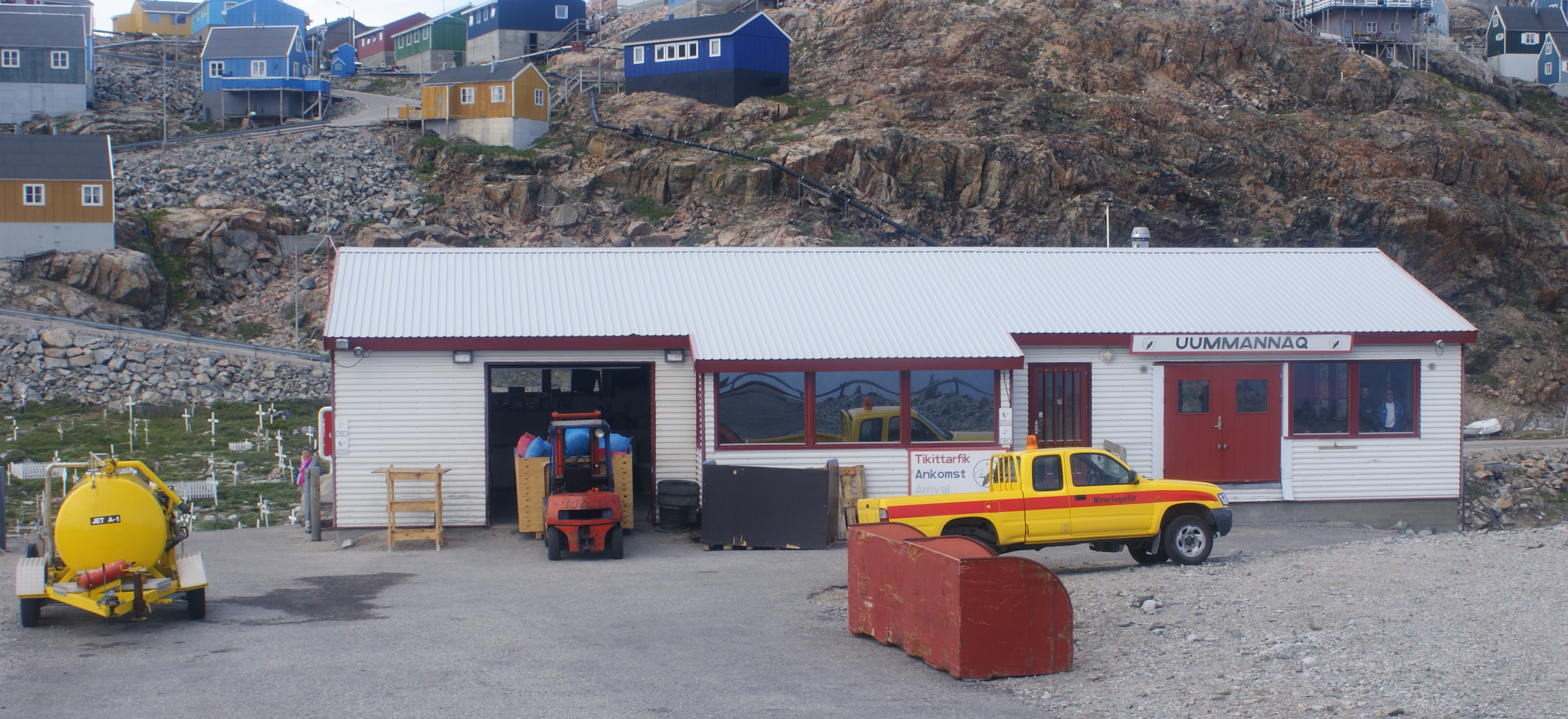
- IATA: UMD; ICAO: BGUM

Summary
- Airport type: Public
- Operator: Greenland Airport Authority (Mittarfeqarfiit)
- Serves: Uummannaq, Greenland
- Elevation AMSL: 50 ft / 15 m
- Coordinates: 70°40′49″N 052°09′42″W
- Website: Uummannaq Heliport

Map
- Location in Greenland

Helipads
Number	Length		Surface
Number	m	ft	Surface
1	20 × 20	66 × 66	Asphalt
- Source: Danish AIS, GCM, STV

Uummannaq Heliport (IATA: UMD, ICAO: BGUM) is a heliport in Uummannaq, a town located on Uummannaq Island in Avannaata municipality in northwestern Greenland. There are no facilities in the heliport.

== Airlines and destinations ==
Airlines	Destinations
Air Greenland	Qaarsut
Air Greenland (settlement flights)	Ikerasak, Illorsuit, Niaqornat, Nuugaatsiaq, Saattut, Ukkusissat

Air Greenland operates government contract flights to villages in the Uummannaq Fjord region. These mostly cargo flights are not featured in the timetable, although they can be pre-booked. Departure times for these flights as specified during booking are by definition approximate, with the settlement service optimized on the fly depending on local demand for a given day.

== Qaarsut Airport ==
Neighboring Qaarsut Airport, located on Nuussuaq Peninsula on the other side of the Uummannaq fjord is the only daily connection available from Uummannaq, serving fixed-wing flights of Air Greenland. It functions as a mini-hub for Uummannaq, marketed as Uummannaq Airport regardless of its actual location, registration, documentation, and existing booking systems.

== Photographs ==
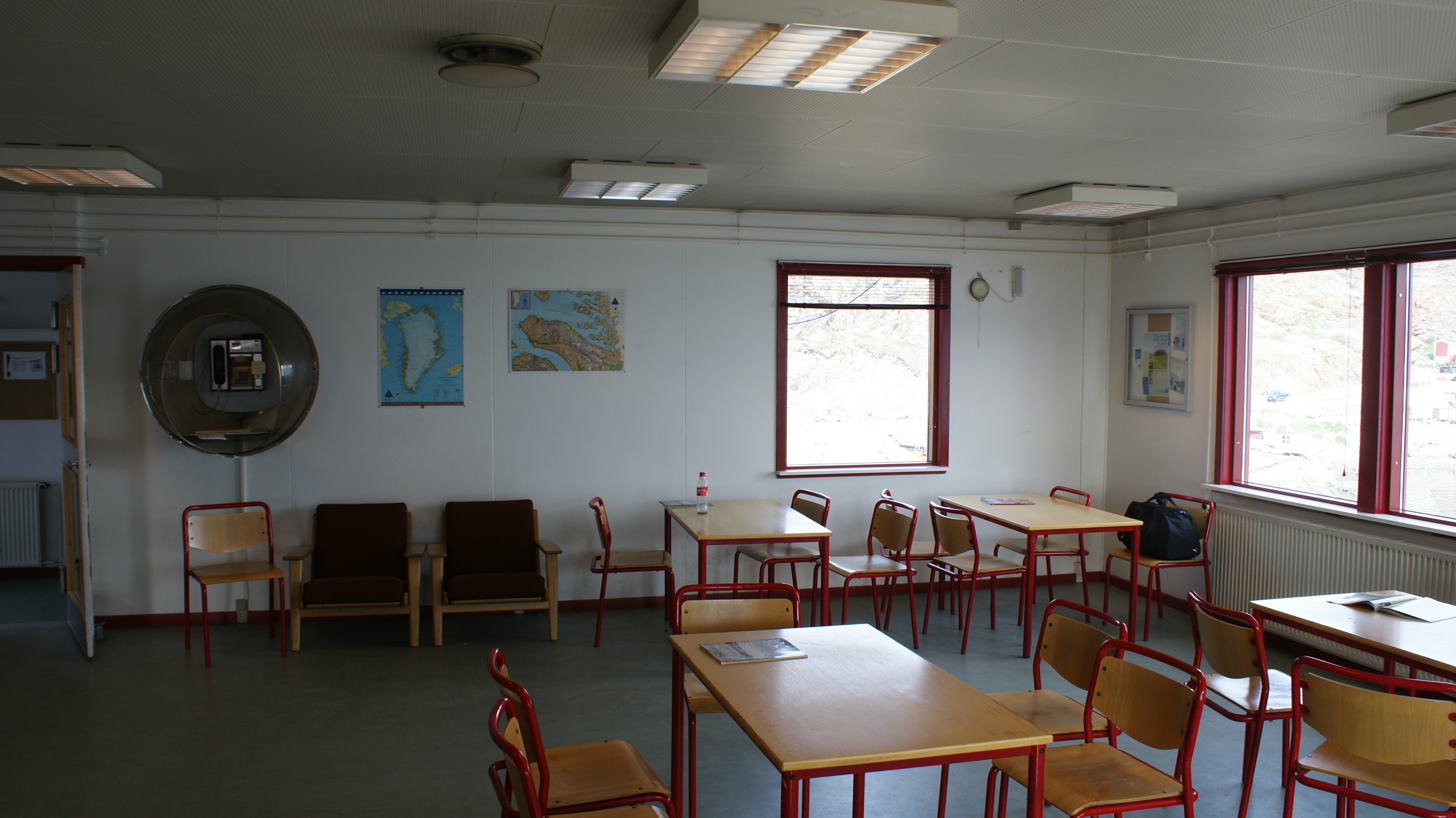
Terminal hall

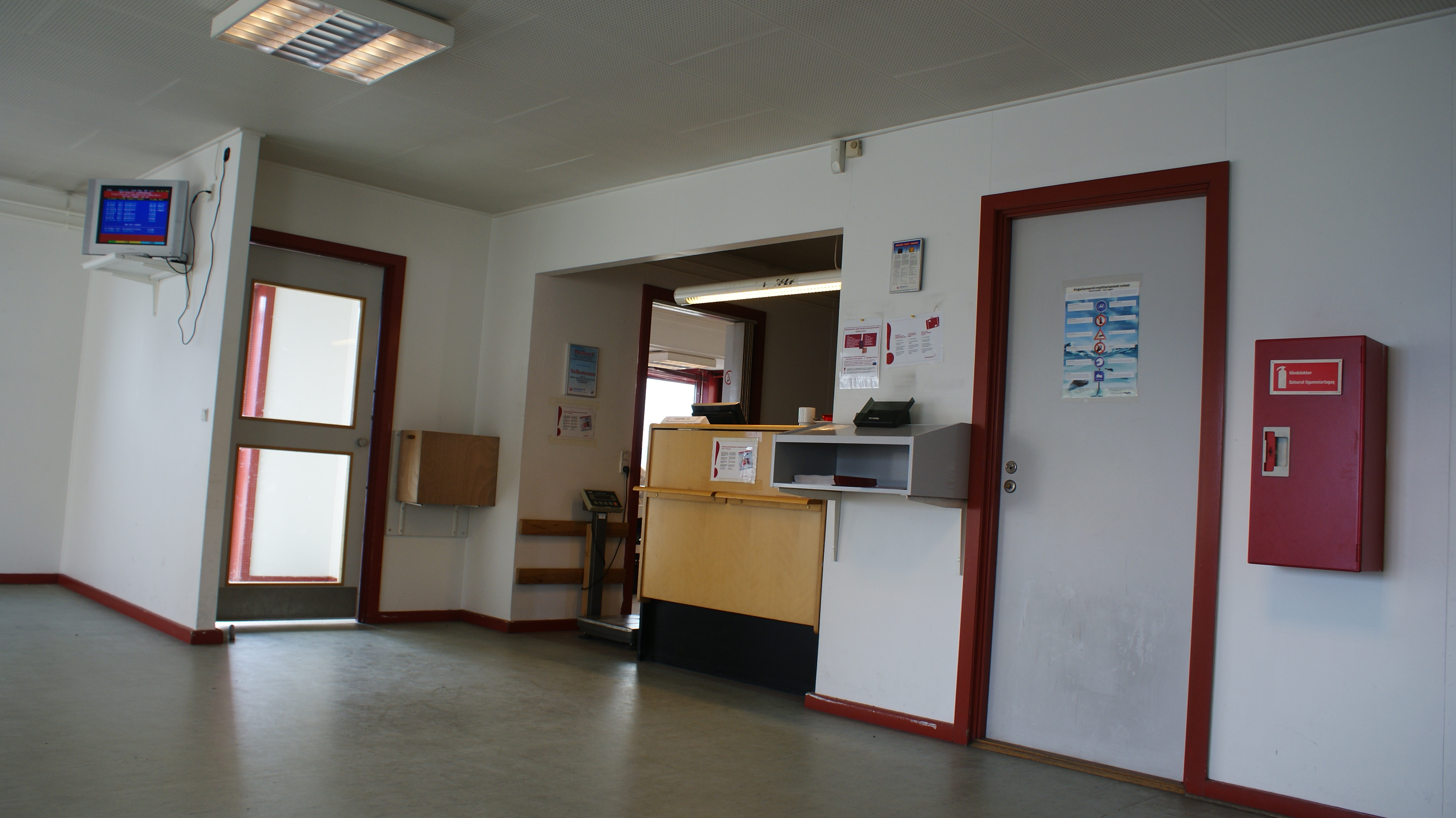
Check-in desk

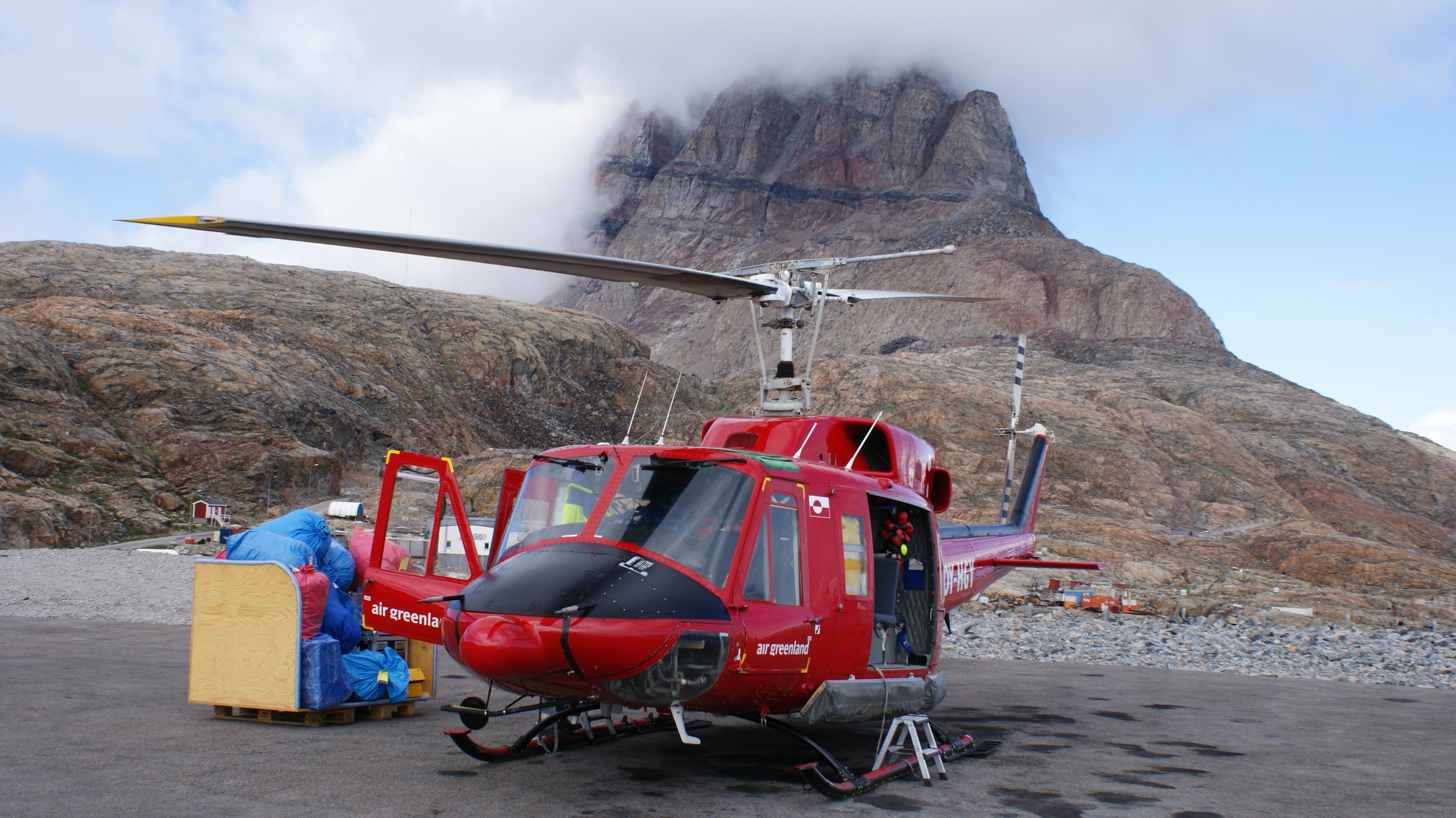
Air Greenland Bell 212 helicopter

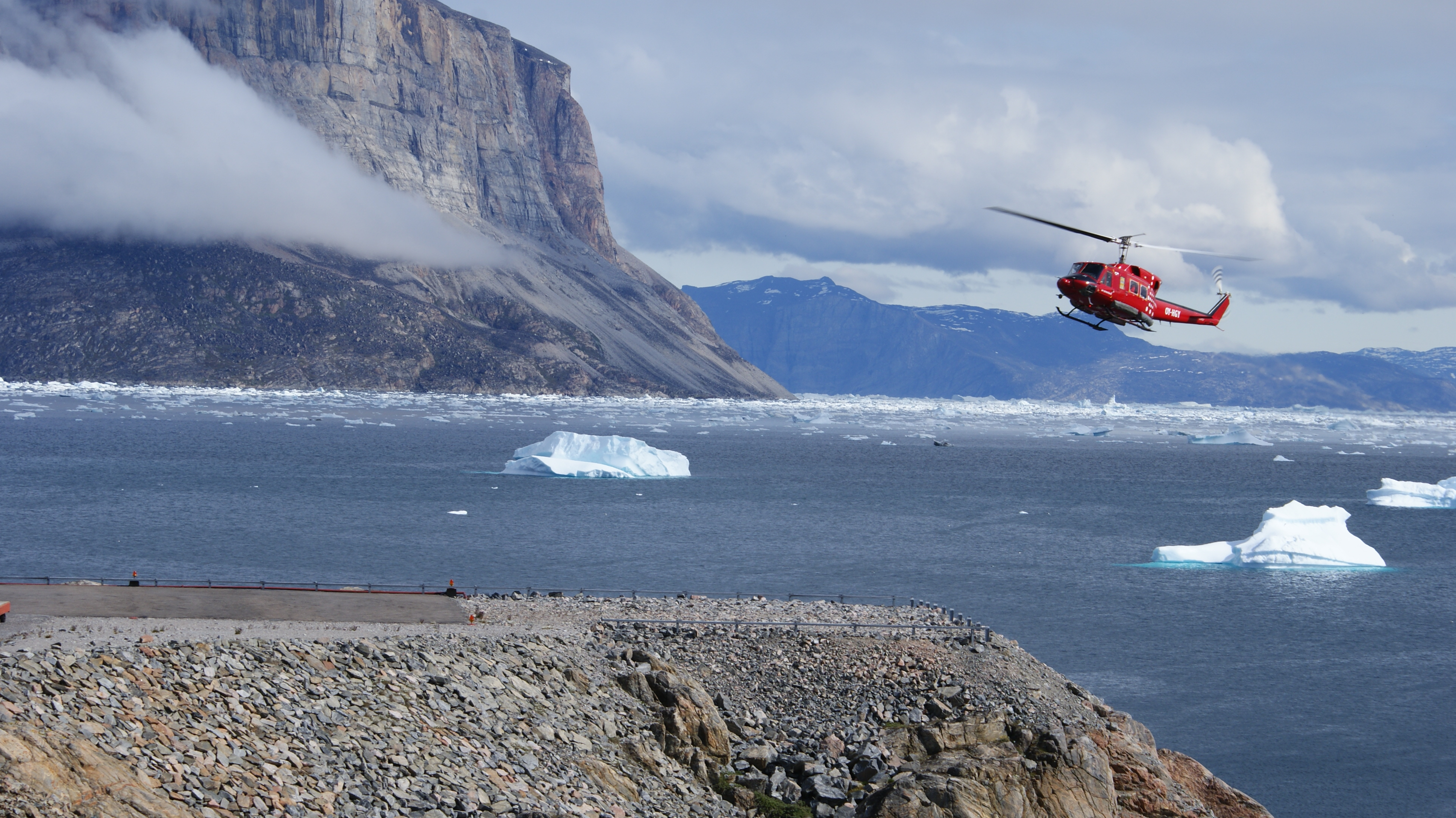
Air Greenland Bell 212 helicopter approaching helipad

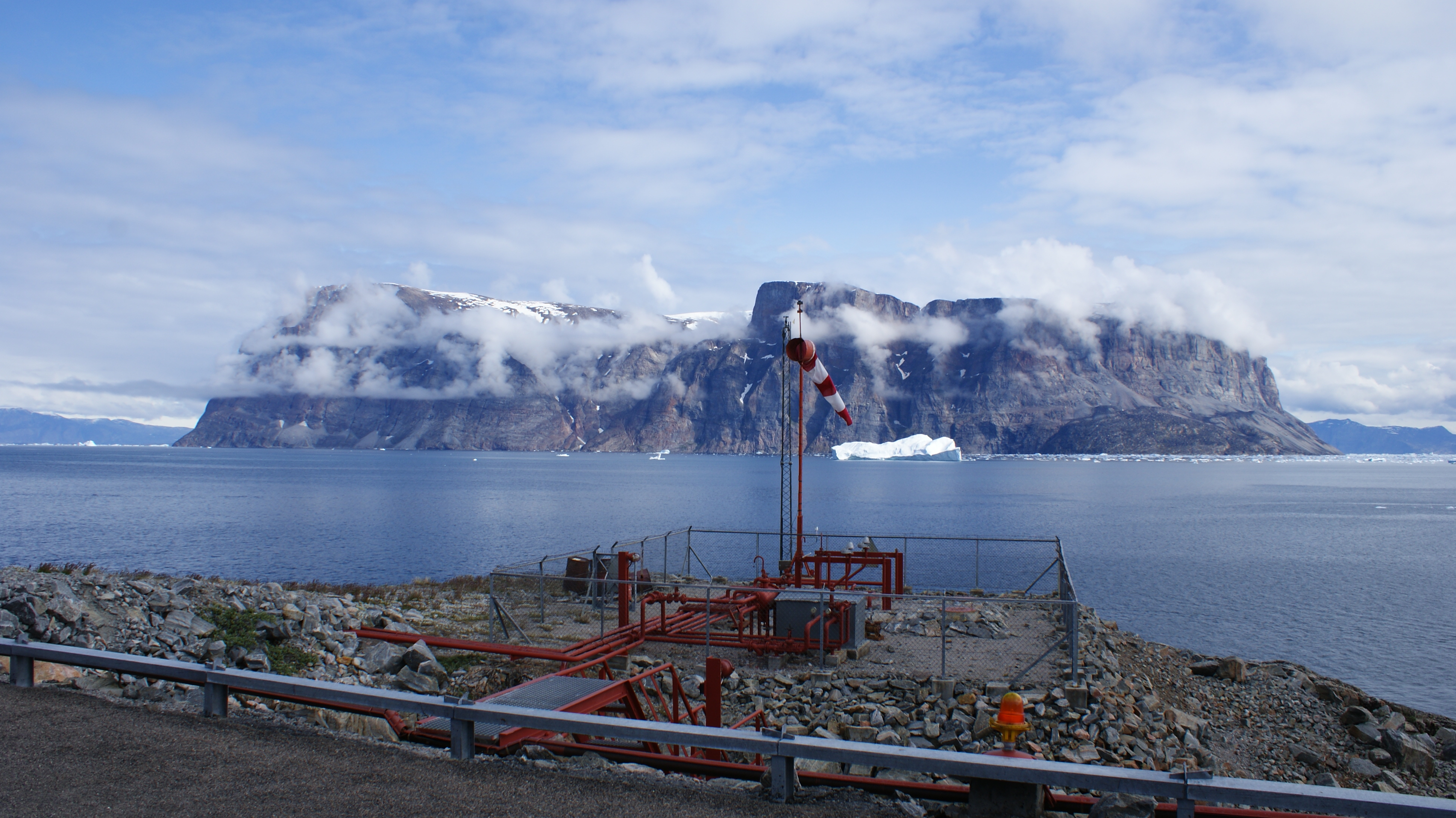
Windsock and vista from the helipad towards Salliaruseq Island across Sarqarput Strait

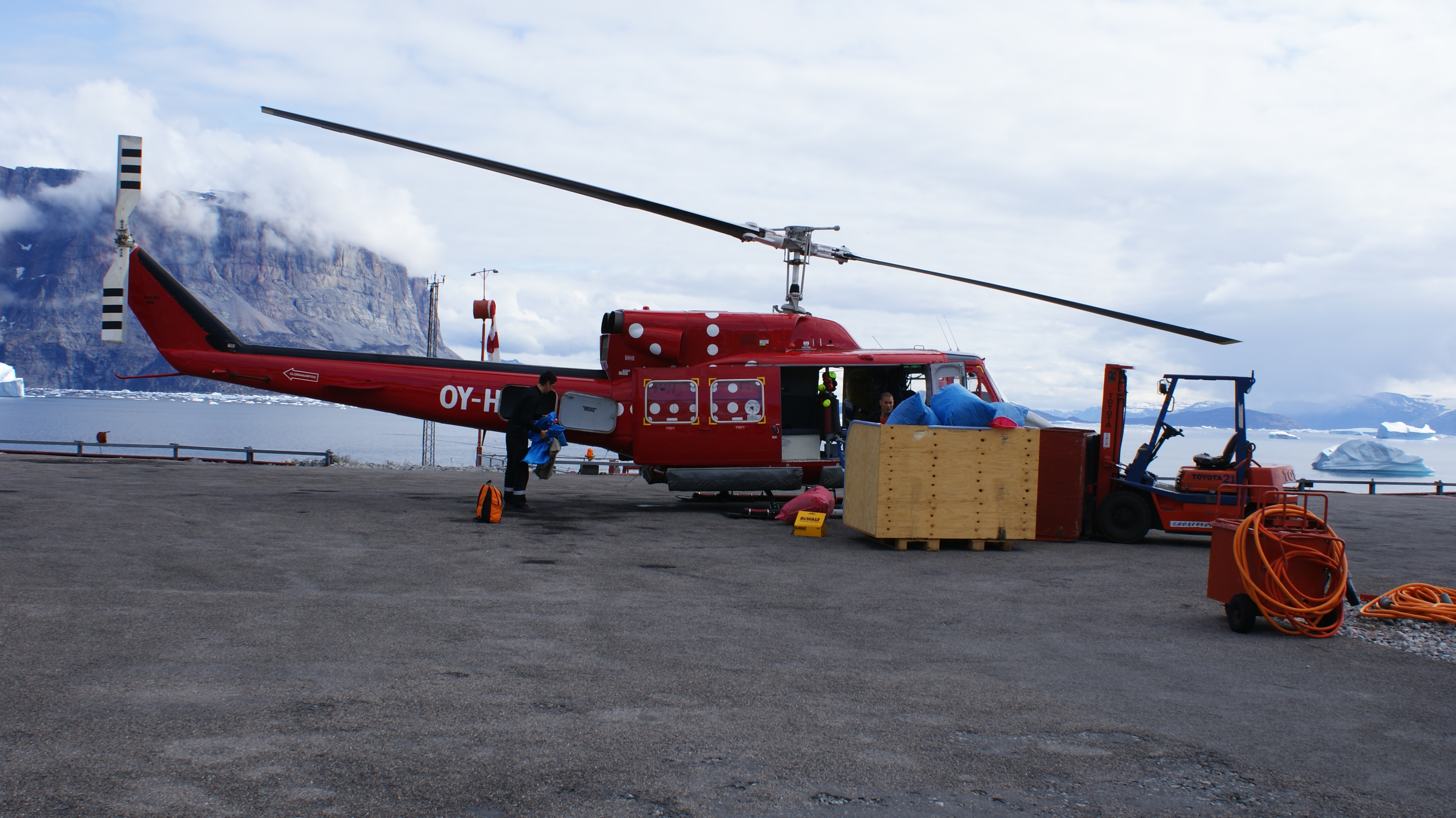
Unloading baggage from the Air Greenland Bell 212 helicopter

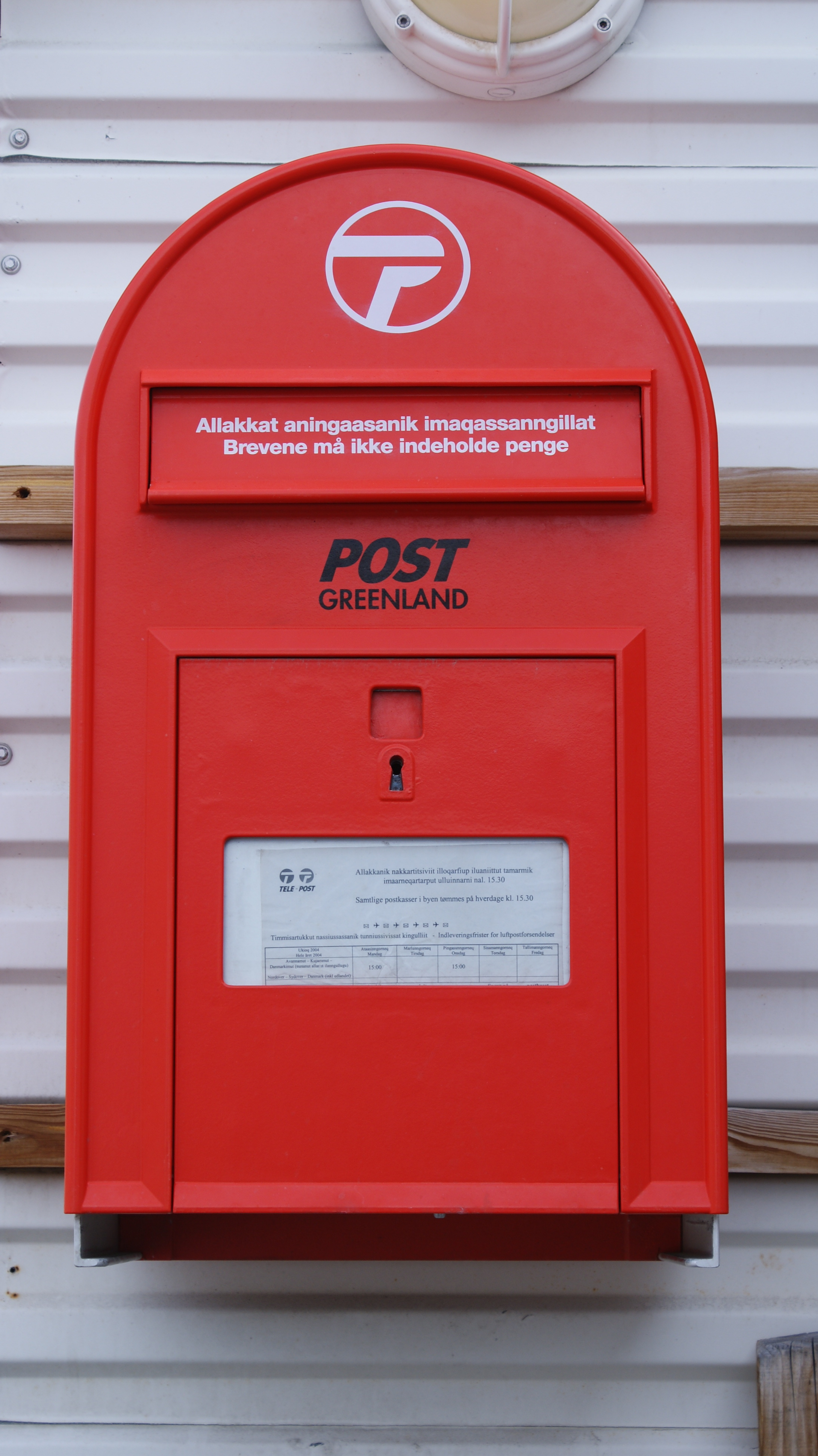
A red postbox of Post Greenland by the entrance
