= Greenland Provincial Council =

Local government bodies in Greenland

The Greenland Provincial Council (Danish: Grønlands Landsråd) was the provincial government of Greenland between 1950, when it was formed from the union of the earlier North and South Greenland Provincial Councils, and 1 May 1979, when it was replaced by the Greenland Home Rule Government and its Parliament (Greenlandic: Kalaallit Nunaanni Inatsisartut; Danish: Grønlands Landsting).

The Provincial Council had thirteen members and was presided over by a royally-appointed Governor (Landshevding), assisted by an interpreter.

== Wording ==
The translation is inexact and carries some political overtones. There are Greenlanders who prefer to refer to the former Landsråd as the Greenland National Council. It was occasionally referred to during its existence as the Greenland Parliament, although today this would cause confusion with the Home Rule Inatsisartut. Other translations include the Greenland Assembly and the more literal Greenland Land Council.

== History ==
The Danish colony in Greenland had been divided North and South since the Instruction of 1782 was issued by the Royal Greenland Trading Company, the government-operated corporation which ruled the Danish settlements and monopolized their trade. Each region was directed by a royal inspector in cooperation with a local council.

Following changes in the Greenlandic economy produced by climate change and the American occupation of the island during World War II, the government of Denmark ordered a commission to examine the realm's policies and administration over the island. The Greenlander's chief concerns were (1) an end to the ban on entry into the island which had even led to the isolation of the American bases there from the local population; (2) an end to government monopolies over trade with the island held by the Royal Greenland Trading Department; (3) an end to the separate systems of laws concerning Danes and Inuit.

Men and women older than 23 and resident on the island six months were eligible to vote.

== First Council ==
The first Provincial Council to be elected by direct suffrage was elected on 29 June 1951 (excepting Upernavik on account of snow and Nanortalik on account of the island's first measles outbreak) and opened on 25 September 1951. It was the first Greenlandic election to permit female suffrage. During the first election season, there were no parties but some cliques formed among economic groups; all told, turnout was about 6,400 from an eligible population of about 8,750.

| Constituency | Name | Occupation |
|---|---|---|
| Nanortalik | Jacob Nielsen | outpost manager |
| Julianehåb | Frederik Nielsen | schoolmaster |
| Frederikshåb | Gerhard Egede | clergyman |
| Narssaq | Abel Kristiansen | catechist |
| Godthåb | Augo Lynge | schoolmaster |
| Sukkertoppen | Peter Egede | outpost manager |
| Holsteinsborg | Knud Olsen | shop assistant |
| Kangatsiaq | Nikolai Rosing | outpost manager |
| Egedesminde | Frederik Lynge | ex-colony manager |
| Disko Bugt (Christianshåb & Jakobshavn) | Marius Sivertsen | trade assistant |
| Disko (Godhavn & Qutdligssat) | Jens Olsen | clergyman |
| Umanaq | Peter Fleischer | outpost manager |
| Upernavik | Hendrik Olsen | trade assistant |

All were native-born Greenlanders and employees of the Greenland Administration. They selected Augo Lynge and Frederik Nielson to represent Greenland in the Danish Parliament and Frederik Lynge to represent it on the board of the Royal Greenland Trading Department.

== See also ==
- List of inspectors of Greenland, for heads of the earlier North and South councils before the 1920s
- List of governors of Greenland, for heads of the divided and unified councils before Home Rule
- List of Chairmen of the Landsråd of Greenland, for heads of the unified council during its existence
