= Qernertuarssuit =

Abandoned settlement in Greenland

Coordinates: 70°59′40″N 52°14′50″W

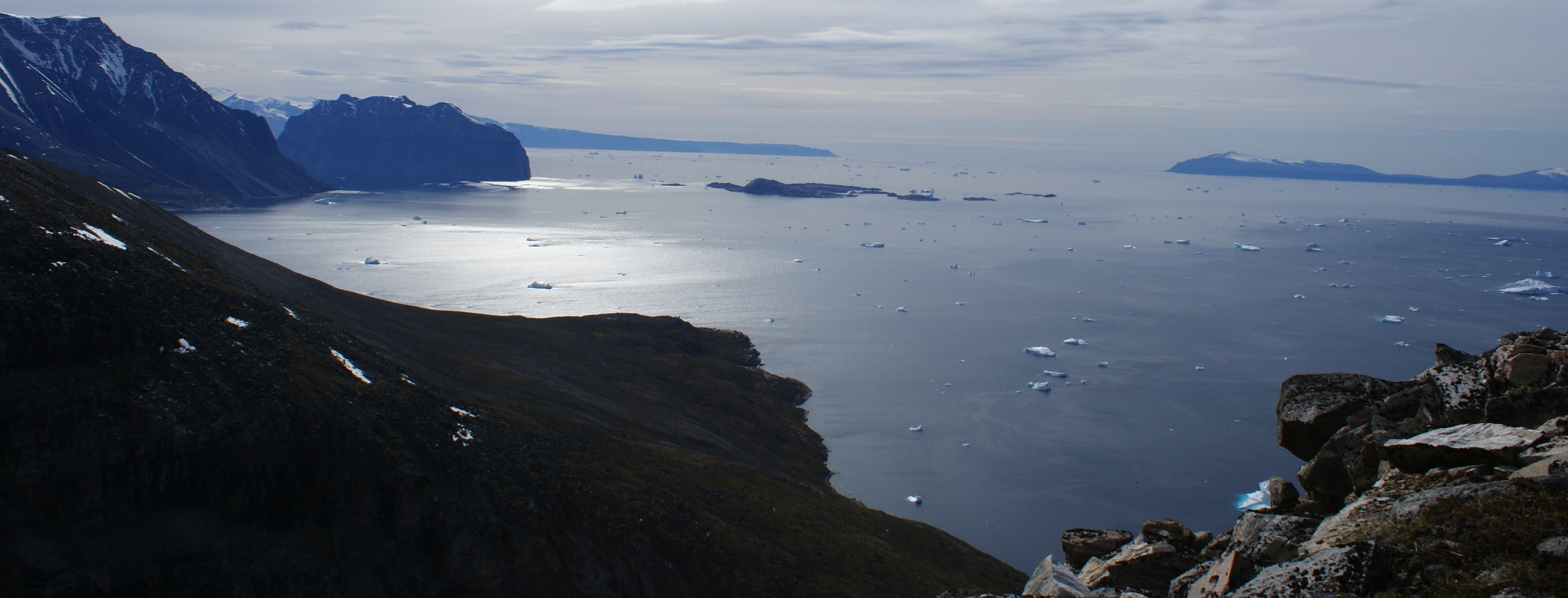
Appat Island, Salleq Island, and Qeqertat skerries seen from Ukkusissat Peninsula

Location within Greenland

Qernertuarssuit is an abandoned settlement in northwestern Greenland, located on one of the Qeqertat skerries in Uummannaq Fjord north of Salleq Island.
