= Maamorilik =

Mining site in Greenland

Maarmorilik
- Location within Greenland
- Location: Avannaata, Greenland; 71°07′35″N 51°16′40″W
- Products: Iron, lead, silver, zinc

Maarmorilik (old spelling: Mârmorilik, also Black Angel Mine) is a mining site in the Avannaata municipality in northwestern Greenland. Holding resources of zinc, iron, lead, and silver, the mine is 5 km (3.1 mi) long, with its entry level situated 750 m (2,460 ft) above the sea level.

== Geography ==
The mine is located approximately 24 km (15 mi) northeast of Ukkusissat in the Akuliarusikassak massif on the mainland of Greenland, on the southern shore of the Qaumarujuk Fjord, a tributary fjord of Perlerfiup Kangerlua, an inner branch of the Uummannaq Fjord.

== History ==
The first excavations in Maarmorilik took place from 1938, possibly earlier, with operations continuing until 1945, and again from 1973 to 25 July 1990 when the mine was closed. During seventeen years of operation, the mine yield of zinc ore amounted to 12 mln tonnes.

=== Environmental impacts ===
During operations, mine tailings were disposed into the fjord, releasing between 10 and 30 tonnes of lead and 30 to 50 tonnes of zinc annually. The disposal of tailings left a legacy of water pollution, contaminating surrounding bodies of water and marine organisms, long after the mine's closure. For years, it was recommended not to collect and consume blue mussels within a 30 km radius of the mine site due to elevated lead concentrations.

For the first 10 years of operation, disposal of waste rock outside the mine was unregulated and 2 to 3 million tonnes of waste rock containing lead and zinc were left in four dump sites. Rain and glacial meltwater washed the metals into the sea. One dump site located at the shore of the Qaamarujuk Fjord had the highest concentrations of lead and zinc in seaweed and blue mussel, and was removed after the mine's closure to mitigate metal pollution.

Metal pollution from dust, mainly from the refinery and ore crushers, resulted in the release of 2 tonnes of lead and 5 tonnes of zinc into the atmosphere annually and would dispersed long distances.

=== Environmental injustice ===
Noise, dust and smoke pollution from the mining site disrupted the local hunting communities' seal hunt. Harvestable seafood became contaminated with lead and zinc. In 1975, the local hunters blockaded an ore ship to protest the impact of spring icebreaking on sea ice travel, water pollution from mine tailings, and contamination of water and marine organisms.

=== Reactivation ===
In 2008 the government of Greenland decided to reinvigorate mining activities in Maarmorilik, aiming to provide an economic lifeline to the communities of the Uummannaq region, keeping the relatively new Qaarsut Airport open. Proceeds from mineral resources exploitation will provide Greenland with a counterbalance to the lump-sum subsidies from Denmark.

The operations were carried out by Angel Mining plc, a UK-registered company. As of April 2010, work continues on widening of the mine entrance to the required 300 m (980 ft). The mine is due to reopen in 2013, with zinc and iron ore reserves expected to last for 50 years. Prospective employment is estimated at 110 people.

In November 2026, Amaroq Ltd announced a new development concept for Maarmorilik, bringing together the past-producing Black Angel & Nunngarut ore bodies with surrounding deposits, known as the ‘String of Pearls’, within a coordinated mining and infrastructure plan. Amaroq Ltd submitted a Project Terms of Reference to the Government of Greenland, a key step to advancing towards redevelopment of the former mine.

== Transport ==
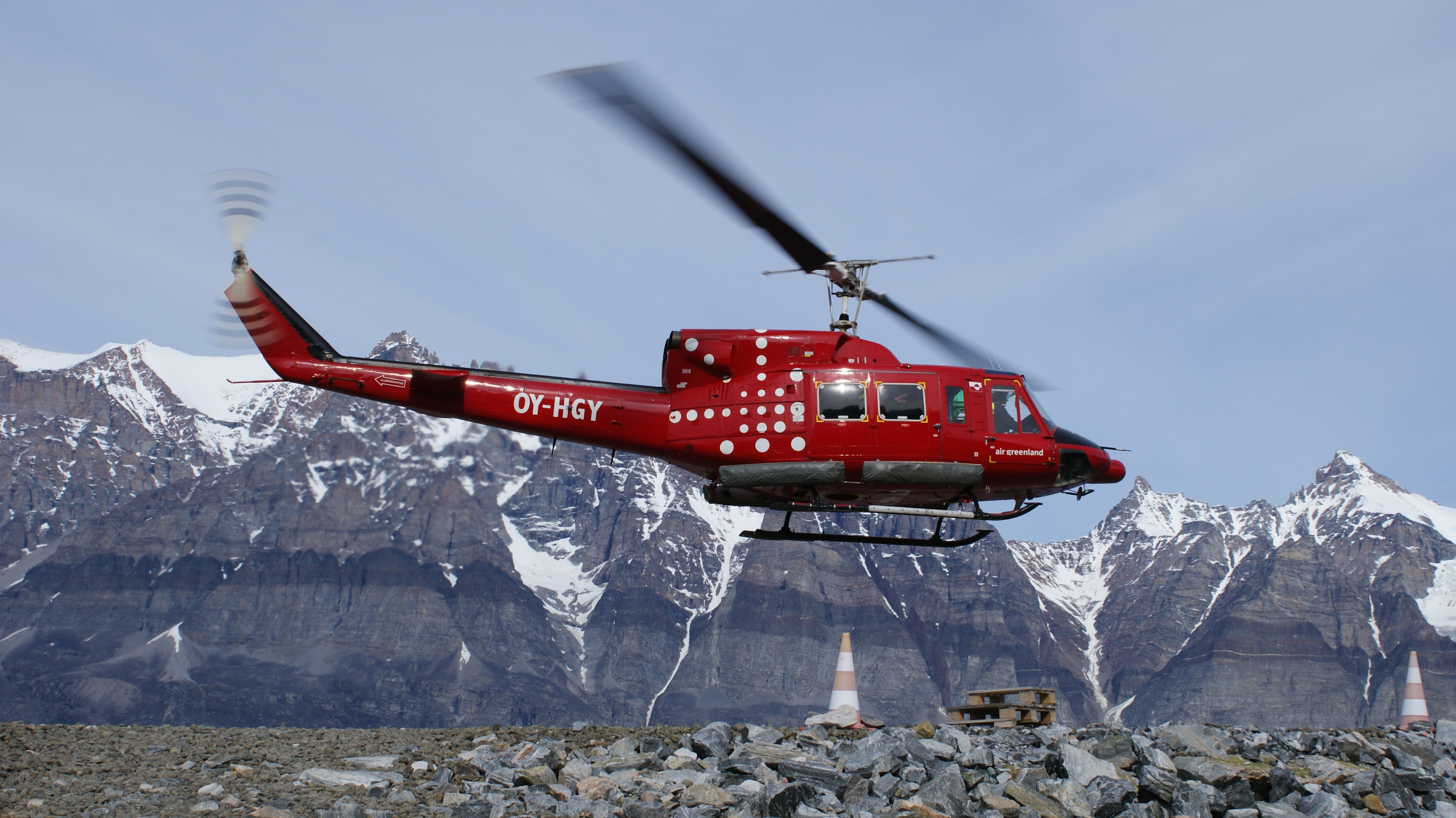
Air Greenland provides charter supply flights to the mining site. Photographed during takeoff in Ukkusissat

Ukkusissat Heliport is the closest aerodrome to the mining site, approximately 24 km (15 mi) to the southwest. As in the 1970s, supplies for the mine reconstruction are carried out via Air Greenland charter flights, now operated with the Bell 212 helicopter stationed in Uummannaq Heliport, 42 km (26 mi) away.

Heavy transport including mining products was and will be transported by ship. A port exists at the fjord. An aerial tramway was used to connect to the mine at 750 m above the fjord.

== Notable person ==
Thue Christiansen, Greenlandic teacher, known for designing the flag of Greenland.
