= Ukk (disambiguation) =

Ukk may refer to:

- Ukk, a village in Hungary
- Nikolai Ukk (born 1980), Russian badminton player

UKK may refer to:

- Oskemen Airport (IATA airport identifier: UKK) in Oskemen (Ust-Kamenogorsk), Kazakhstan
- Ukkusissat Heliport (non-IATA location identifier: UKK), in Ukkusissat, Greenland
- Uppsala Konsert & Kongress, a concert hall and convention centre in Uppsala, Sweden
- Urho Kekkonen (1900–1986), Prime Minister of Finland, President of Finland
- Ultimate Kho Kho, an Indian kho-kho league
