= Ritenbenck =

Former settlement in Greenland, Kingdom of Denmark

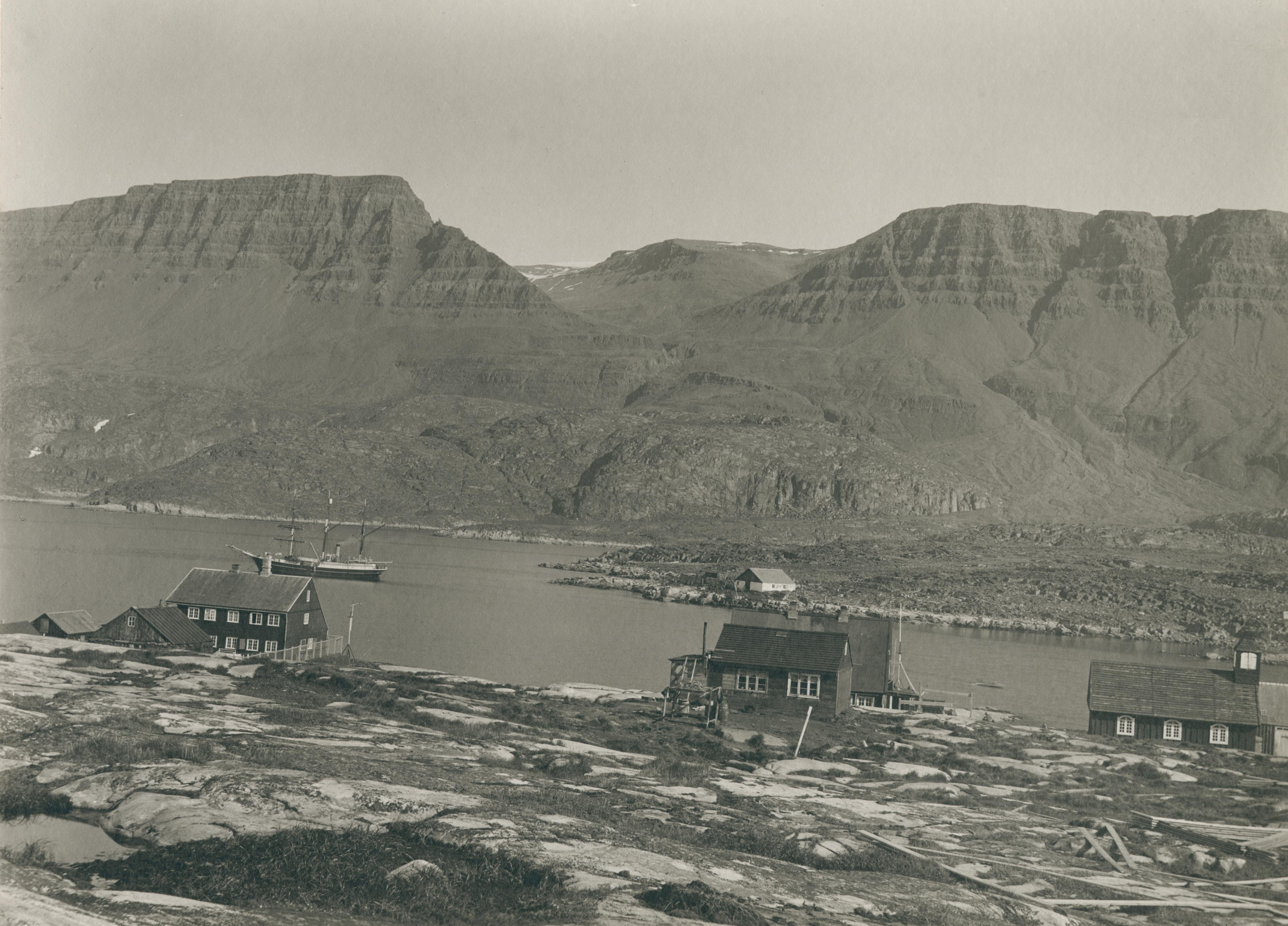
- Ritenbenck as seen from the north

- Location within Greenland
- Coordinates: 69°46′1.2″N 51°19′1.2″W
- State: Kingdom of Denmark
- Constituent country: Greenland
- Municipality: Avannaata
- Established: 1755
- Time zone: UTC-03

Ritenbenck, Ritenbenk or Ritenbench (Greenlandic: Appat) is a former settlement on Appat Island in Avannaata municipality in northwestern Greenland. The island is located in the Uummannaq Fjord.

Ritenbenck was founded in 1755 by the General Trade Company. The name was an anagram of the GTC's then-chairman Christian August Berckentin (1694–1758).

== See also ==
- Qaqortuatsiaq, an abandoned marble quarry on the same island
