= Perlerfiup Kangerlua =

Fjord in Greenland

Location of Perlerfiup Kangerlua

Perlerfiup Kangerlua (old spelling: Perdlerfiup Kangerdlua) is a fjord in Avannaata municipality in northwestern Greenland. It is a tributary fjord of the larger Uummannaq Fjord system.

== Geography ==
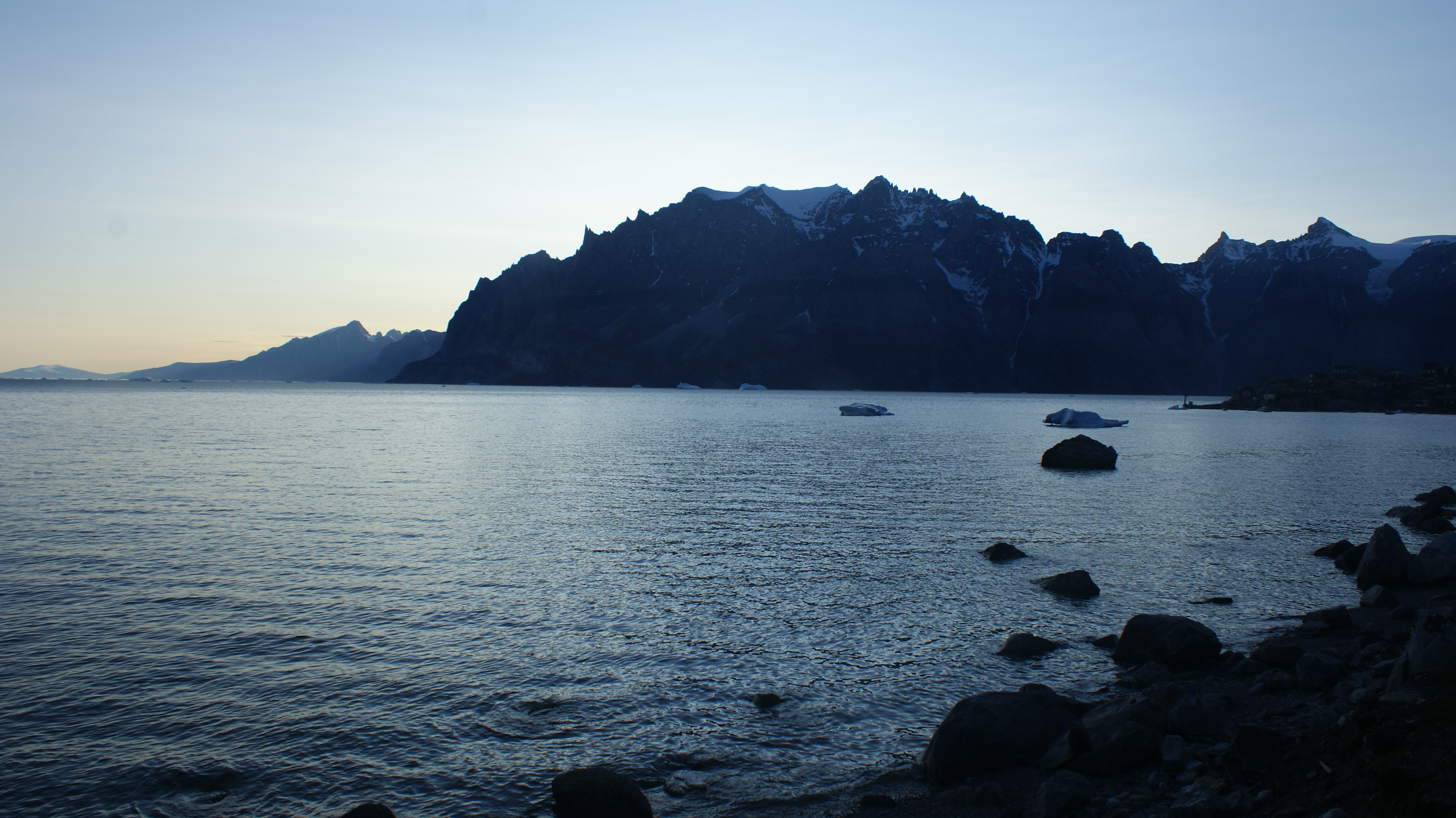
The mouth of Perlerfiup Kangerlua is bounded by steep mountain walls, some nearly 2000 metres high

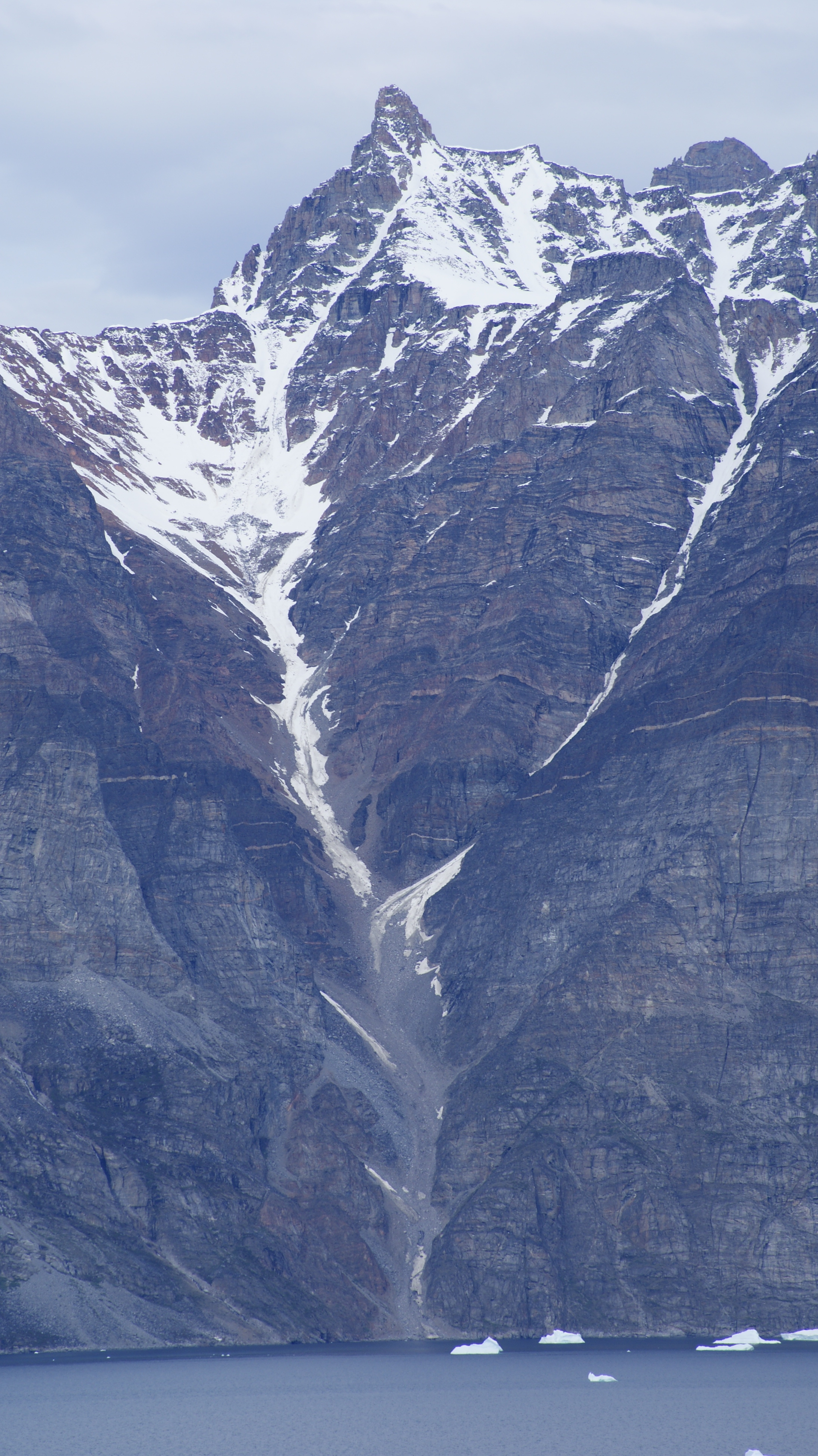
Some of the most prominent walls in Greenland fall into Perlerfiup Kangerlua: a 1922-metre high wall on the northern shore

The fjord head at approximately 70°59′30″N 50°57′00″W is formed by the front of the Perlerfiup Sermia glacier flowing from the Greenland ice sheet (Greenlandic: Sermersuaq). At about one third of its length, the fjord changes direction from westward to northwestward, finally turning sharply to the southwest before confluence with the northeastern part of Uummannaq Fjord at approximately 71°03′10″N 52°00′00″W, due west of Ukkusissat.

The fjord is bounded from the south by the Ukkusissat Peninsula across its entire length. To the north, it is bound by the mainland of Greenland, the highlands of Akularusersuaq and Akuliarusikassak, and the mountains of Perlerfiup Nunaa. The coastline is undeveloped−the fjord has only one tributary fjord on its northern bank, the Qaumarujuk Fjord.

== Settlement ==
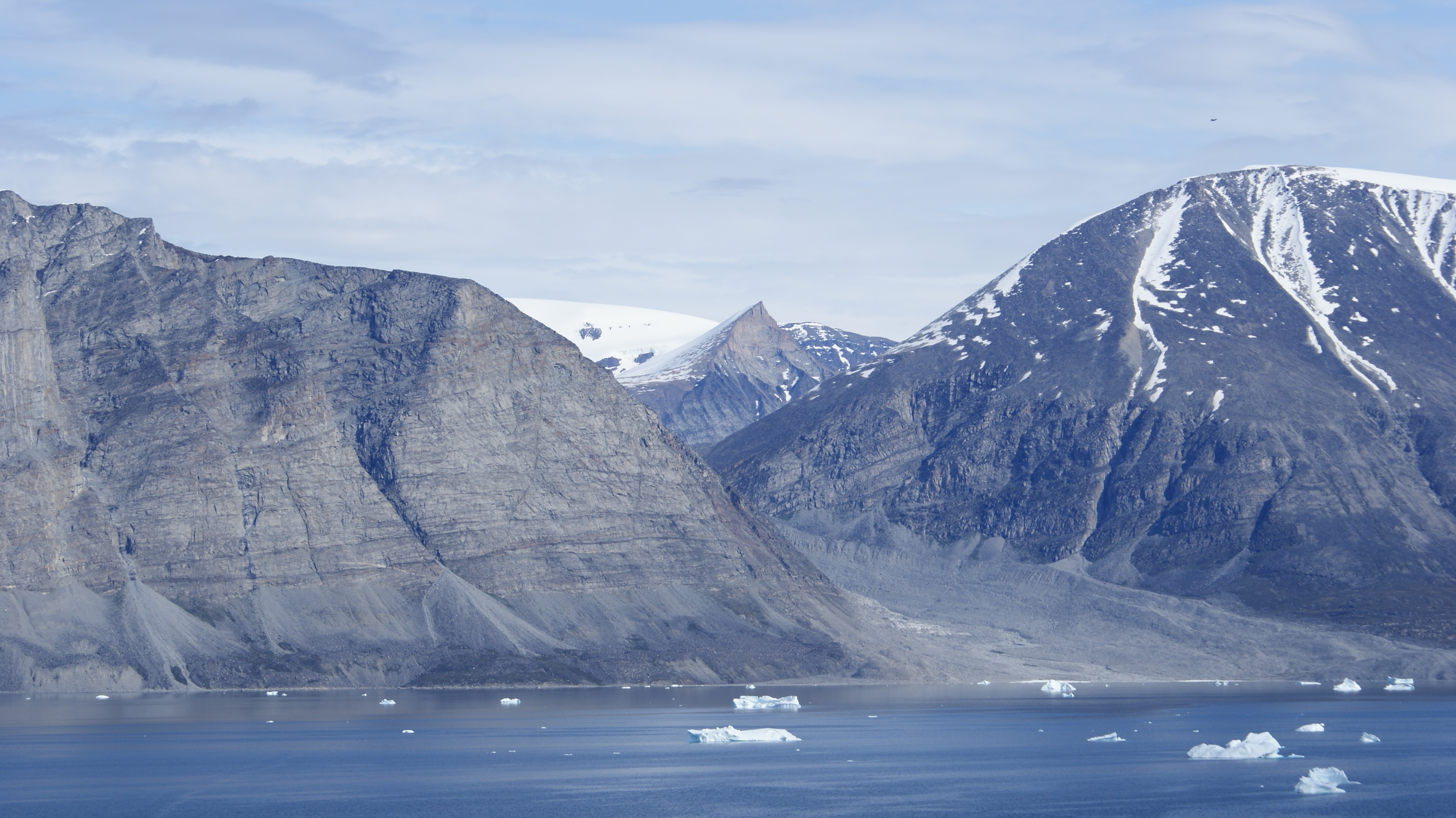
Mallak, a flattened cone of glacial silt below the outflow of the meltwater stream on the northern shore of Perlerfiup Kangerlua

Ukkusissat, perched on the northwestern tip of the Ukkusissat Peninsula at the mouth of the fjord, is the only settlement in the area.

== Mining ==
Maamorilik is a former mining site, currently undergoing reactivation, and slated for reopening in November 2010. Holding resources of zinc, iron, lead, and silver, the mine is 5 km (3.1 mi) long, with its entry level situated 750 m (820 yd) above the sea level.

== Transport ==
The fjord can be reached by individually chartered boats from Ukkusissat. Ukkusissat Heliport served by Air Greenland is the only aerodrome in the area, with twice-weekly connections to Uummannaq.
