= Ukkusissat =

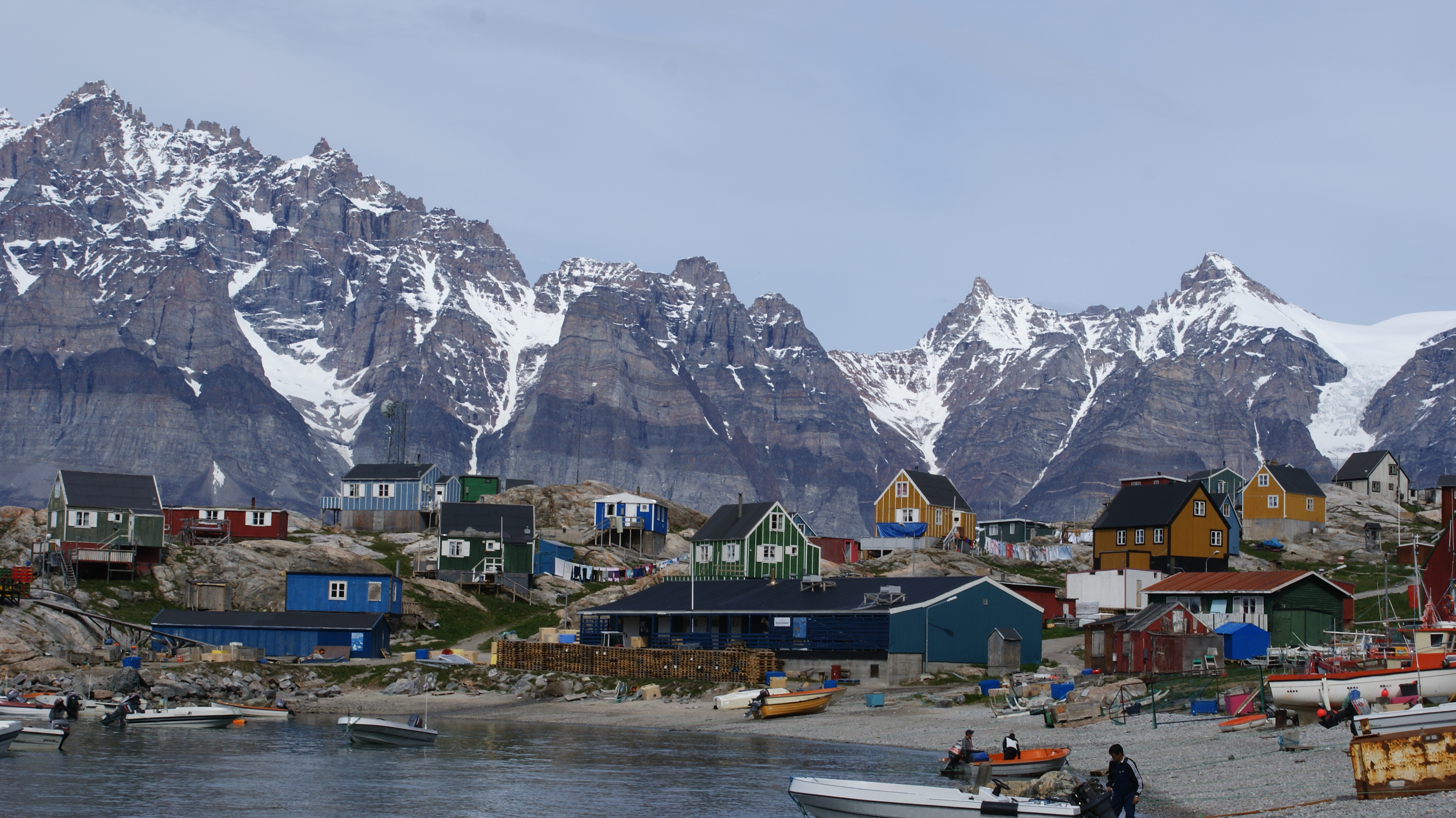
- Ukkusissat

- Location within Greenland
- Coordinates: 71°02′57″N 51°53′15″W
- State: Kingdom of Denmark
- Constituent country: Greenland
- Municipality: Avannaata

Government
  - Mayor: Jakob Amossen

Population (1 January 2025)
  - Total: 151
- Time zone: UTC−02:00 (Western Greenland Time)
  - Summer (DST): UTC−01:00 (Western Greenland Summer Time)
- Postal code: 3961 Uummannaq

Ukkusissat (Greenlandic pronunciation: [ukːusisːat], old spelling: Uvkusigssat) is a settlement in Avannaata municipality, in northwestern Greenland. The population of the settlement was 154 in 2020. The name means soapstone.

== Geography ==
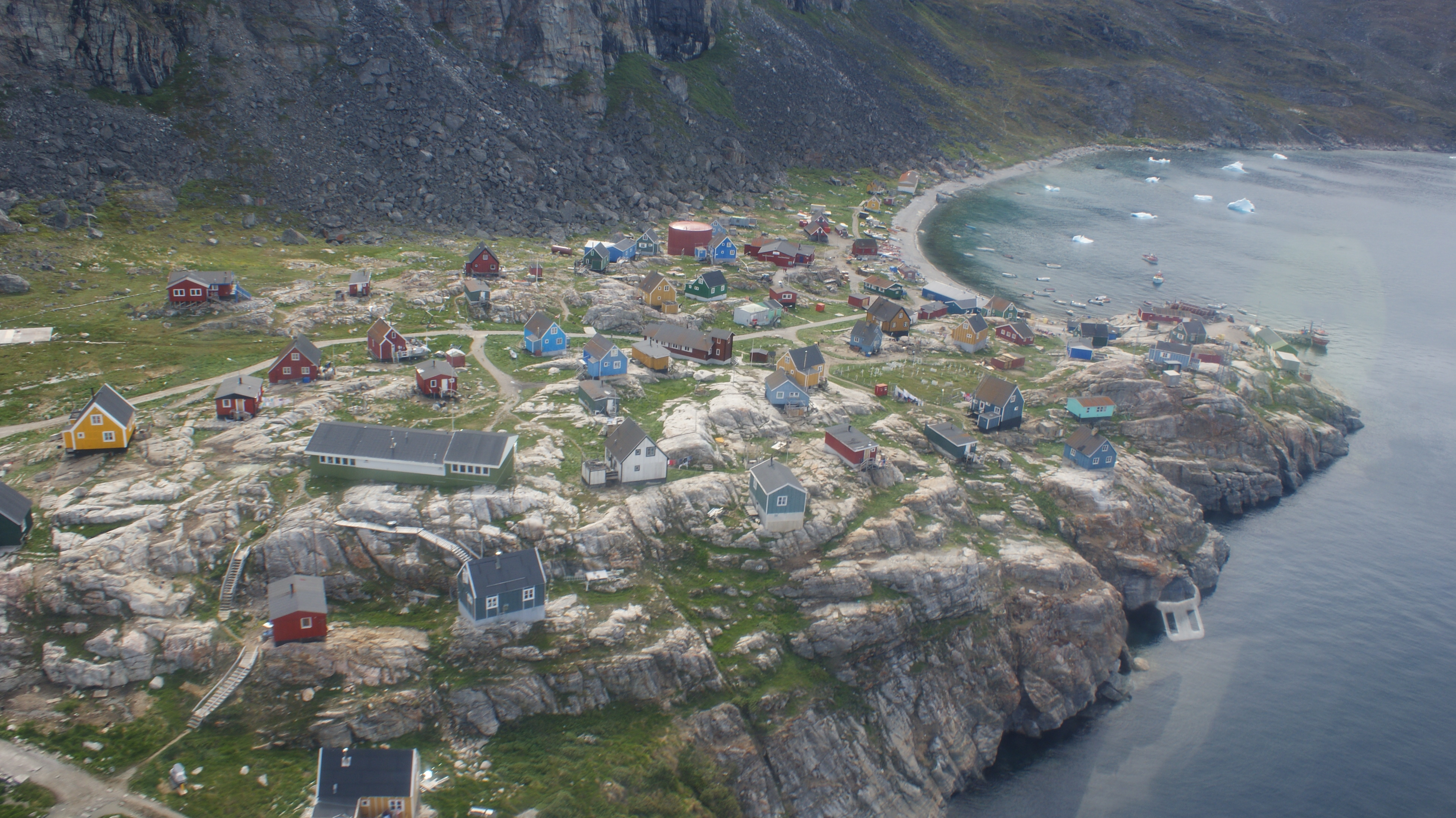
Aerial view of Ukkusissat

The settlement abuts the northwestern tip of the peninsula of the same name, jutting from the mainland to the west and northwest and into the inner waterways of the Uummannaq Fjord system.

To the north of the settlement, Perlerfiup Kangerlua, a large inner fjord empties into the main branch of Uummannaq Fjord.

To the south and southwest across Torsukattak Strait are the high mountains of the Salleq Island and the much larger Appat Island, alongside the flat Qeqertat skerries.

== History ==
Ukkusissat was founded in 1794 as an ousted or trading place. In 1798, there were 28 people living in Ukkusissat but it only was occupied continuously from the 1800s. In 1805, the town had only 18 inhabitants.

== Economy ==
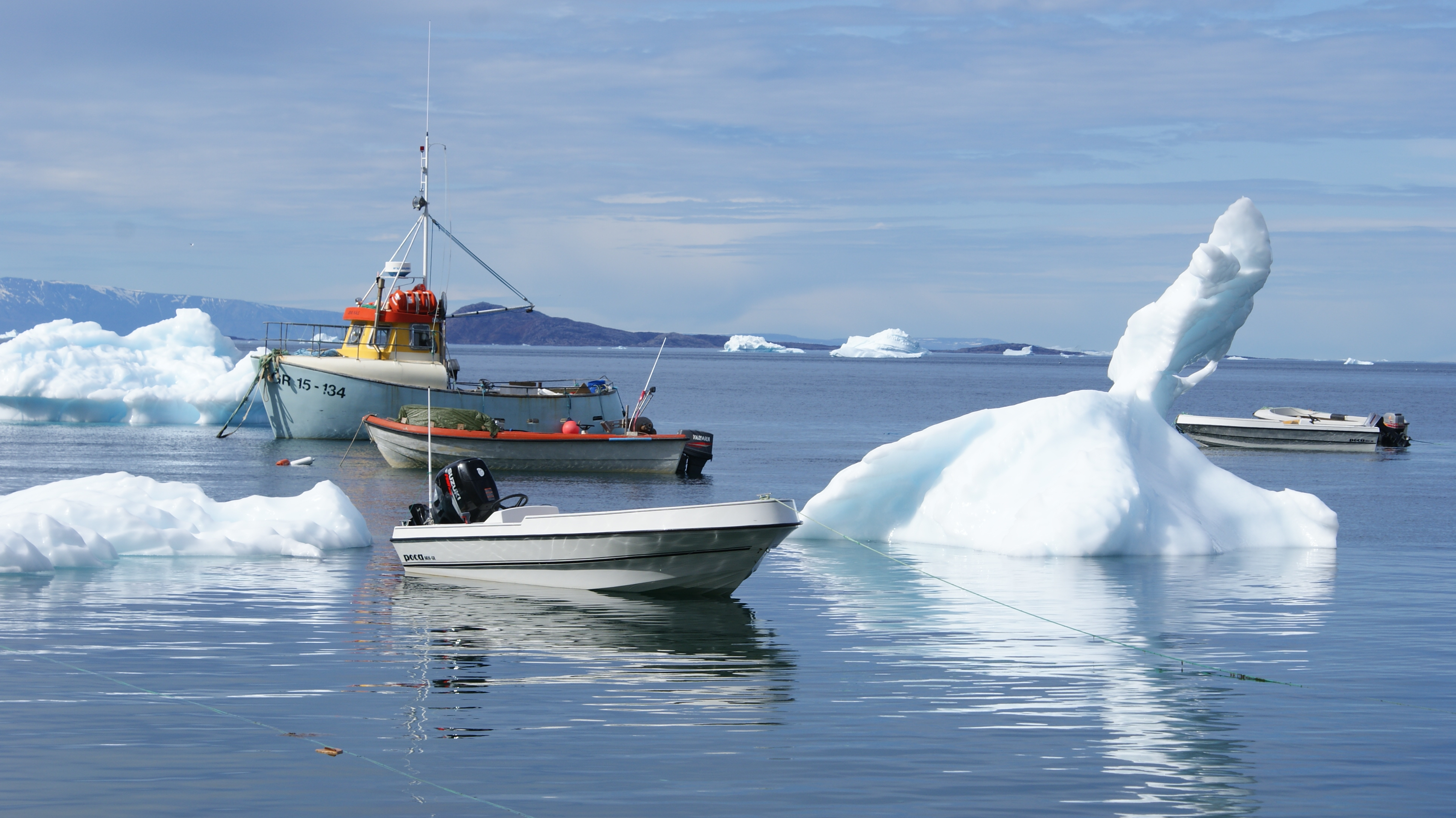
Fishing boats amongst growlers in the Ukkusissat harbour

Fishing is the main occupation in Ukkusissat, with the fish processing plant located at the harbour; many inhabitants employed at Royal Greenland. Reinvigoration of mining activities in the nearby Maamorilik site−located northeast of the settlement on the northern side of Perlerfiup Kangerlua−will provide an economic boost to the local economy.

The community in Ukkusissat is served by Pilersuisoq, an all-purpose communal store. Tourism is underdeveloped, although during summer the settlement is visited by cruise ships, such as Norway's Hurtigruten. The harbour in Ukkusissat cannot handle large ships due to shallow coastal waters.

== Transport ==
=== Air ===
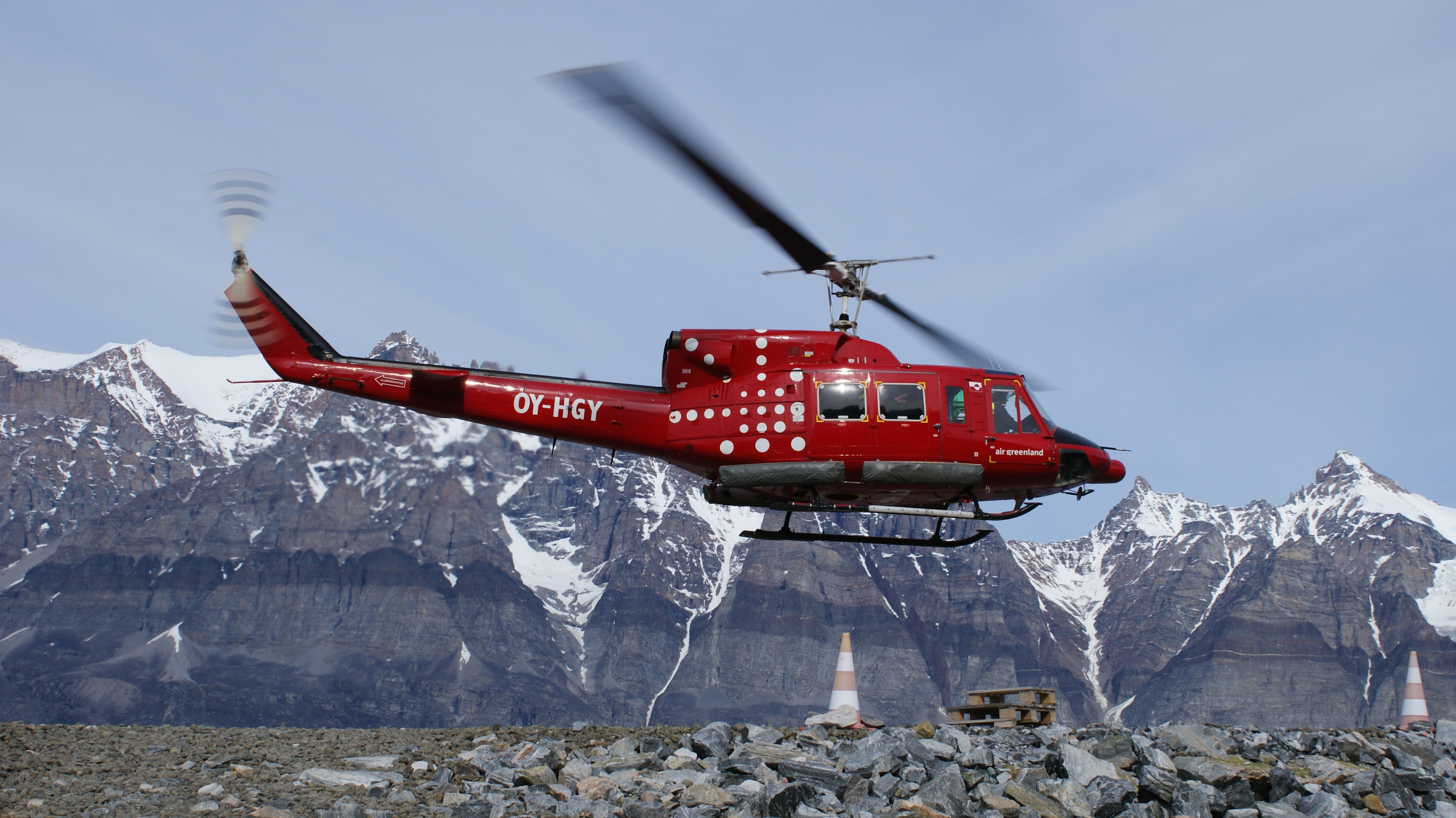
Air Greenland serves the village with a Bell 212 helicopter

Air Greenland serves the village as part of government contract, with flights between Ukkusissat Heliport and Uummannaq Heliport. Check-in for the helicopter flights is administered at Pilersuisoq.

=== Ground ===
In mid-winter, the only means of communication with Uummannaq and other settlements of the area is by dogsled, as district helicopters do not service the settlement at that time of year.

== Population ==
The population of Ukkusissat has dropped by more than 12 percent relative to the 1990 levels, and by more than a quarter relative to the 2000 levels, decreasing in nearly every year of the last decade, and reflecting a general trend in the region.

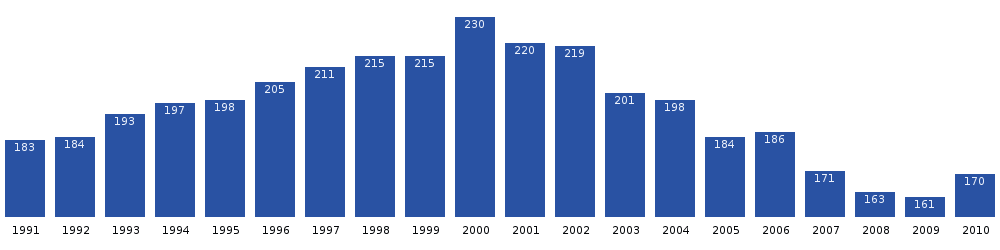
Ukkusissat population growth dynamics in the last two decades. Source: Statistics Greenland

== Photographs ==
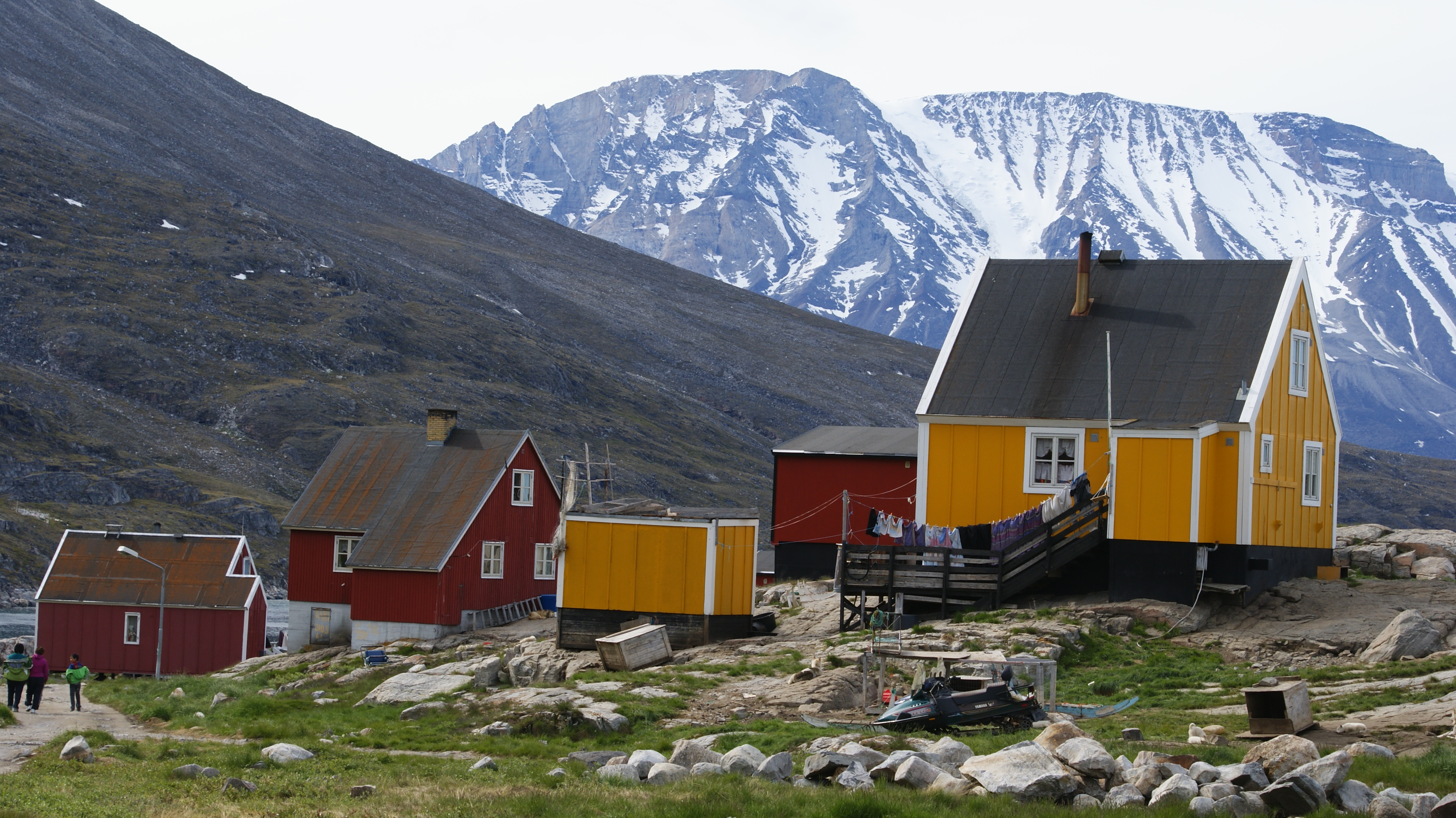
Houses and laundry in mid-summer

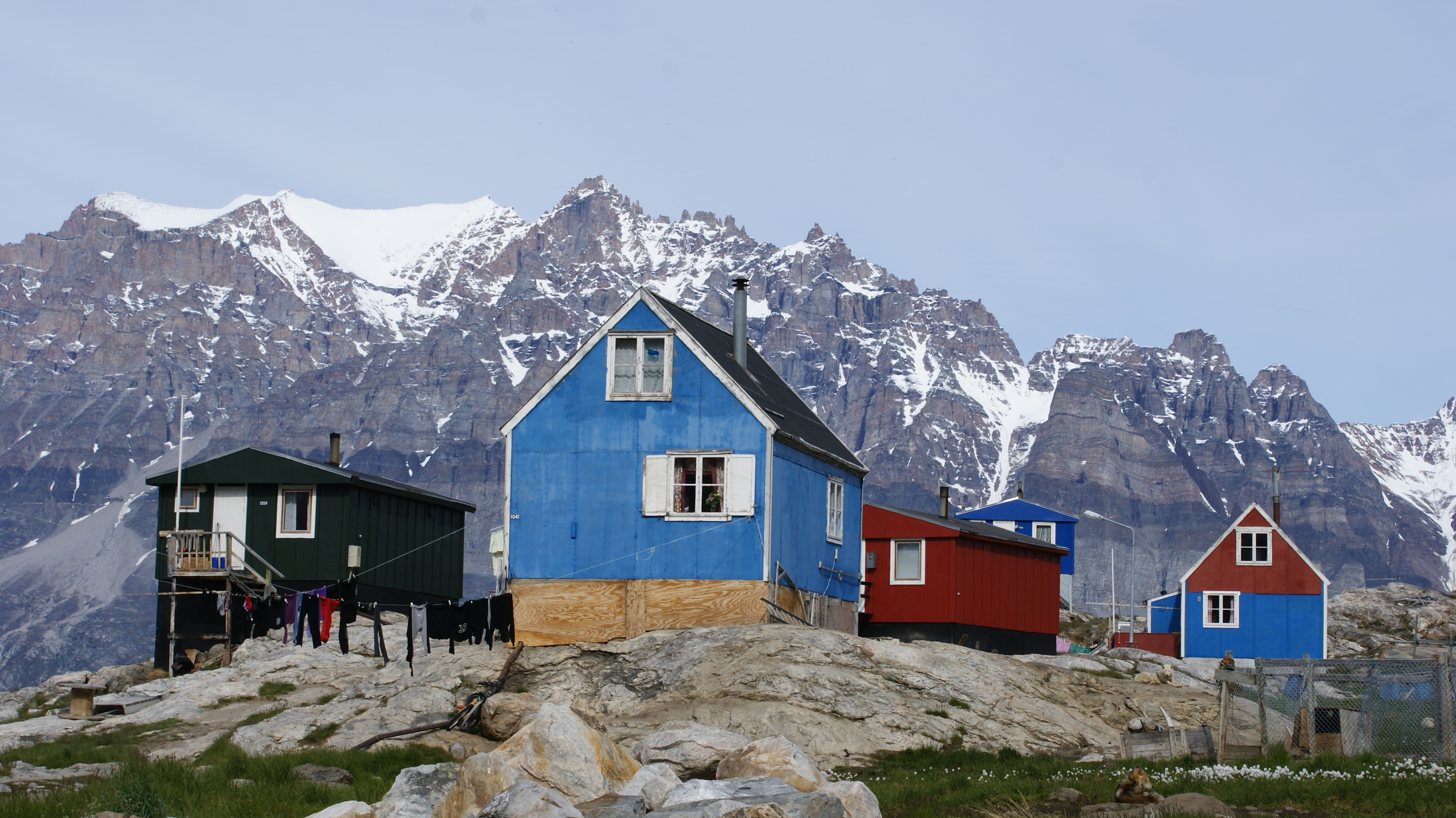
Pellerfiup Nunaa

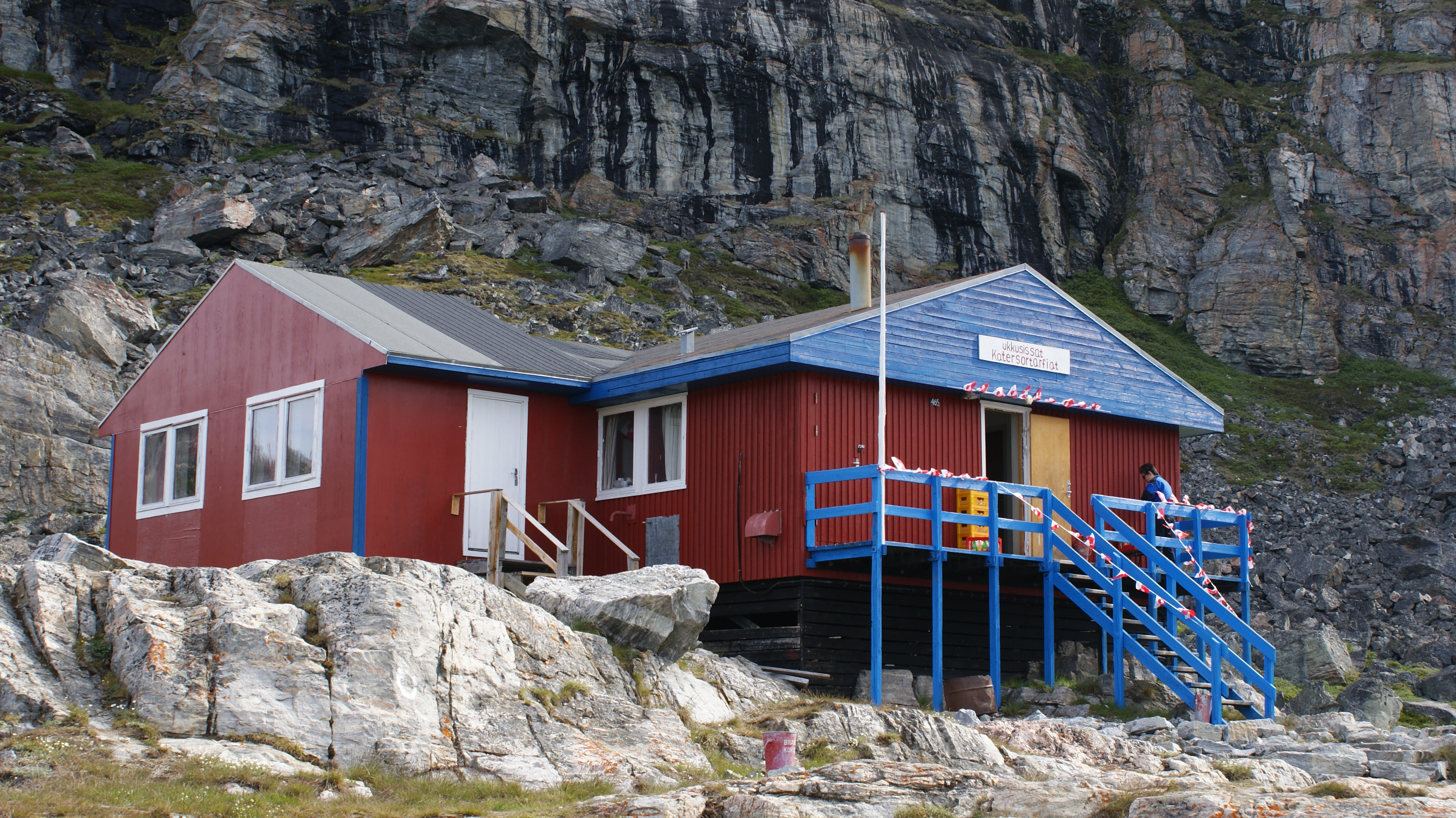
Katersortarfiat, a "public house" used for parties, dancing, and other entertainment

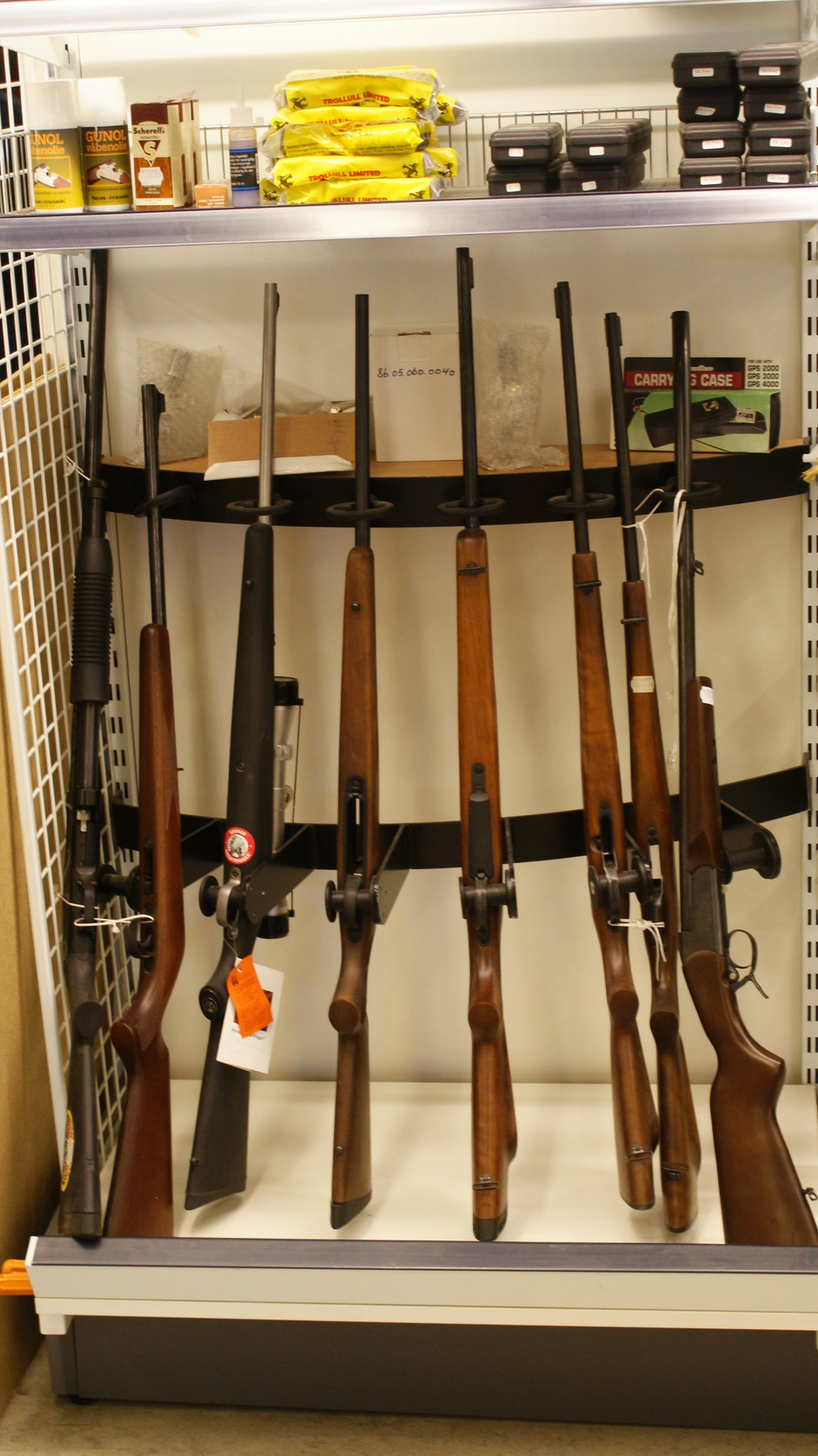
Hunting guns in Pilersuisoq

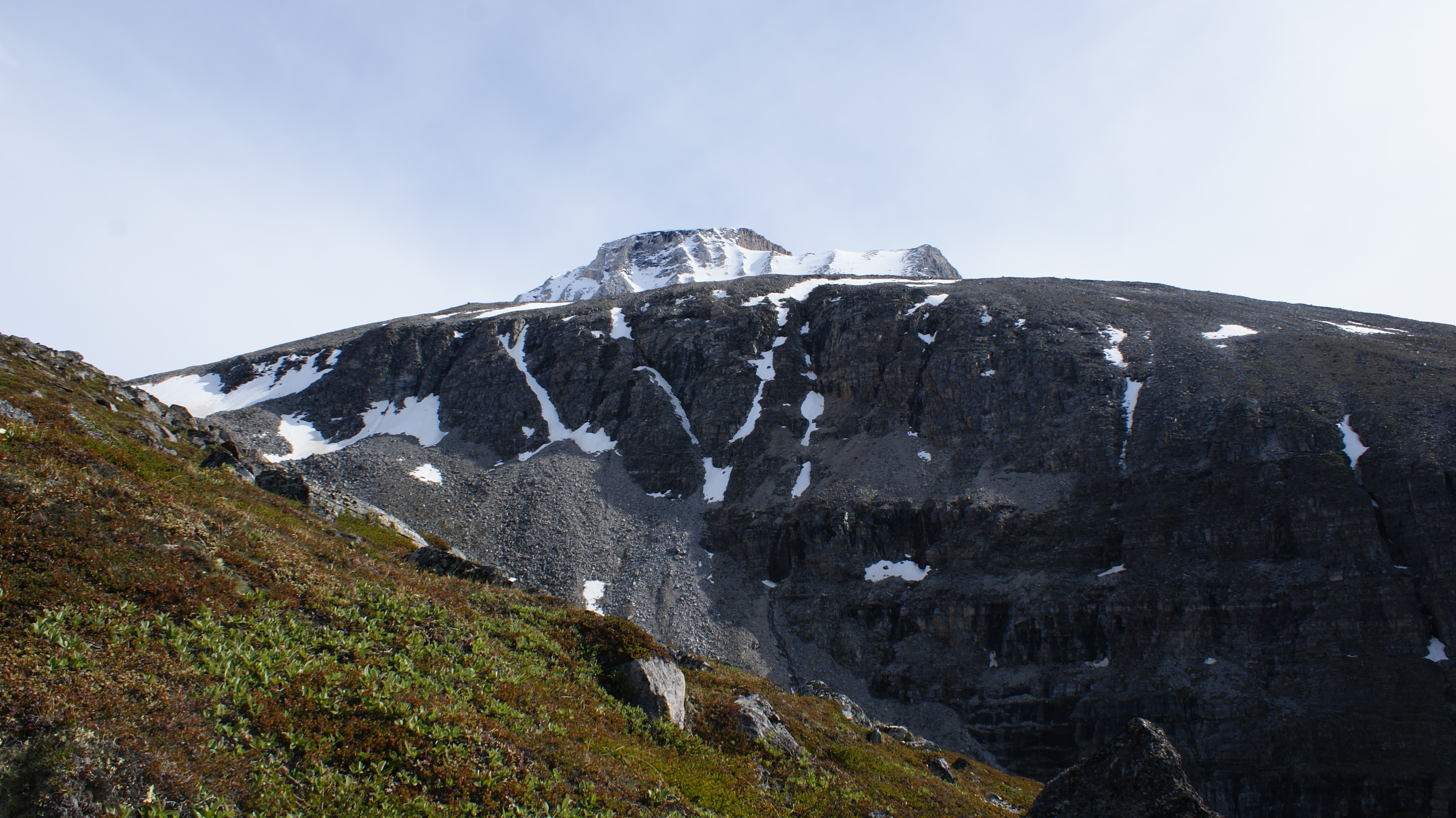
Akuliarutsip Qaqaa. on the Ukkusissat Peninsula mountain range, view from Sermikassaq
