= Qaqortuatsiaq =

Formal marble quarry in Greenland

Coordinates: 70.960°N 51.895°W

Location within Greenland

Qaqortuatsiaq is a former settlement on the northern shore of Appat Island in the Avannaata municipality in northwestern Greenland. Its ruins lay against the Torsukattak Strait of Uummannaq Fjord.

Qaqortuatsiaq was a marble quarry and, though presently abandoned, seems likely to be revived in the future.
