= Appat Island =

Island in Uummannaq Fjord, Greenland

Appat
- Location of Appat Island

- Location within Greenland

Geography
- Location: Uummannaq Fjord
- Coordinates: 70°55′05″N 51°57′00″W
- Area: 180 km^{2} (69 sq mi)
- Length: 23 km (14.3 mi)
- Width: 11 km (6.8 mi)
- Highest elevation: 1,685 m (5528 ft)
- Highest point: Appat Qaqaa

Administration
- Greenland
- Municipality: Avannaata

Demographics
- Population: 0 ( 2026 )

Appat Island (old spelling: Agpat) is an uninhabited island in the Avannaata municipality in northwestern Greenland. At 211 km^{2} (81.5 mi^{2}), it is one of the larger islands in the Uummannaq Fjord system, located in its north-central part. It is the site of the former settlements of Ritenbenck and Qaqortuatsiaq.

Air Greenland helicopters approach Ukkusissat Heliport on the way from Uummannaq Heliport alongside the southern and western wall of Appat, to then pass above the narrow Appat Ikerat strait between Appat and a smaller, mountainous Salleq Island.

== Geography ==
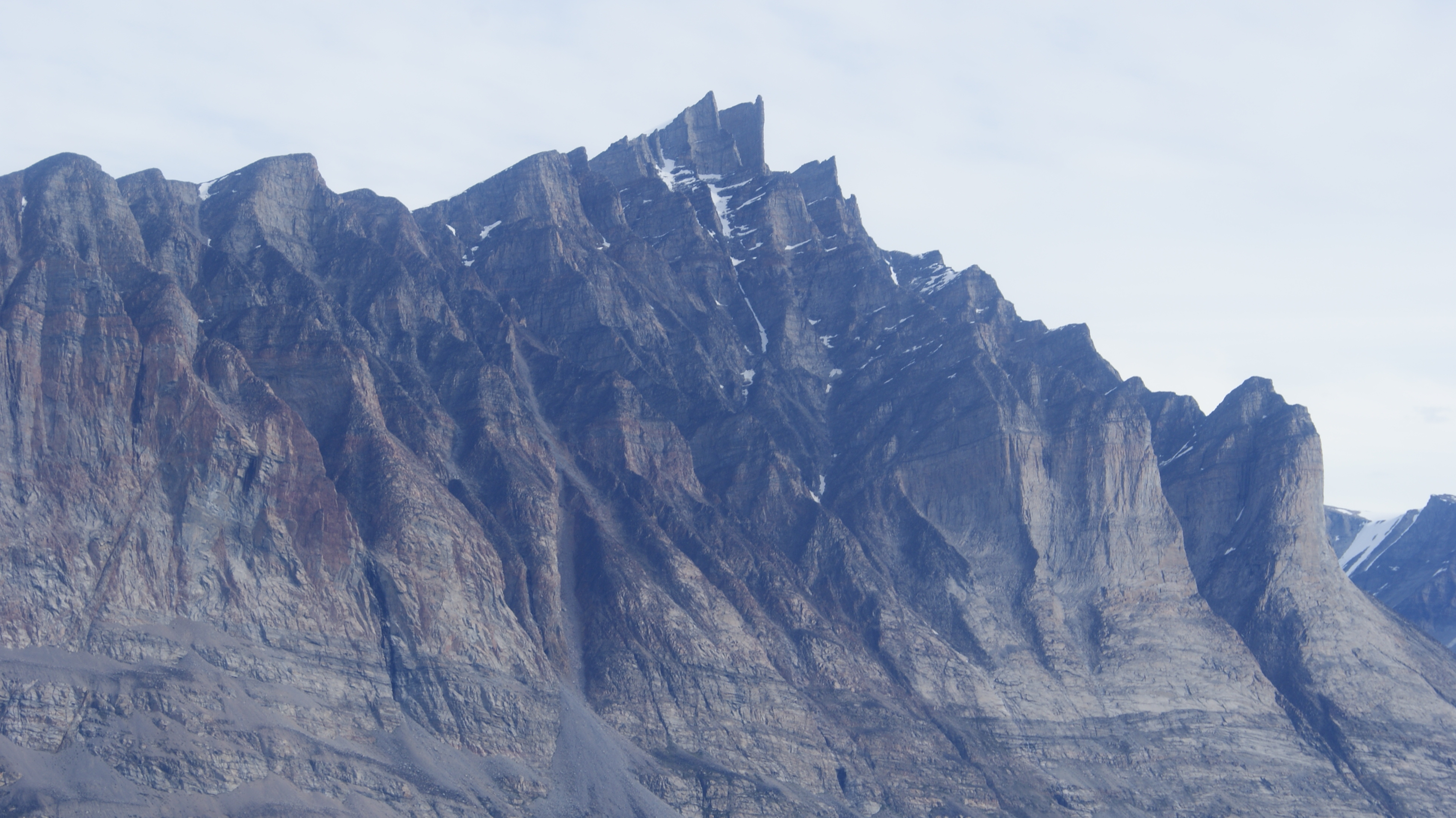
Aerial view of Salliarusiarsuup Qaqarsua, at 1,516 m (4,973.8 ft) the fourth-highest mountain on the island.

Appat Island is separated from Uummannaq Island and Salliaruseq Island in the south by the central arm of the Uummannaq Fjord; from the Salleq Island in the west by the Appat Ikerat strait; from the Ukkusissat Peninsula in the north and northeast by the Torsukattak Strait. A small archipelago of low-lying skerries lies directly to the southeast of the island, with a small settlement of Saattut.

It is very mountainous, with precipitous walls falling from the glaciated summit plateau in all directions. The plateau (and the island itself) is bisected by the Naqellorssuaq valley. The highest point on the island is Appat Qaqaa (1,685.9 m (5,531.2 ft)), a summit in the western part of the glaciated summit plateau. The coastline is undeveloped, apart from the Umiasuqasuup Ilua fjord at the southeastern end.

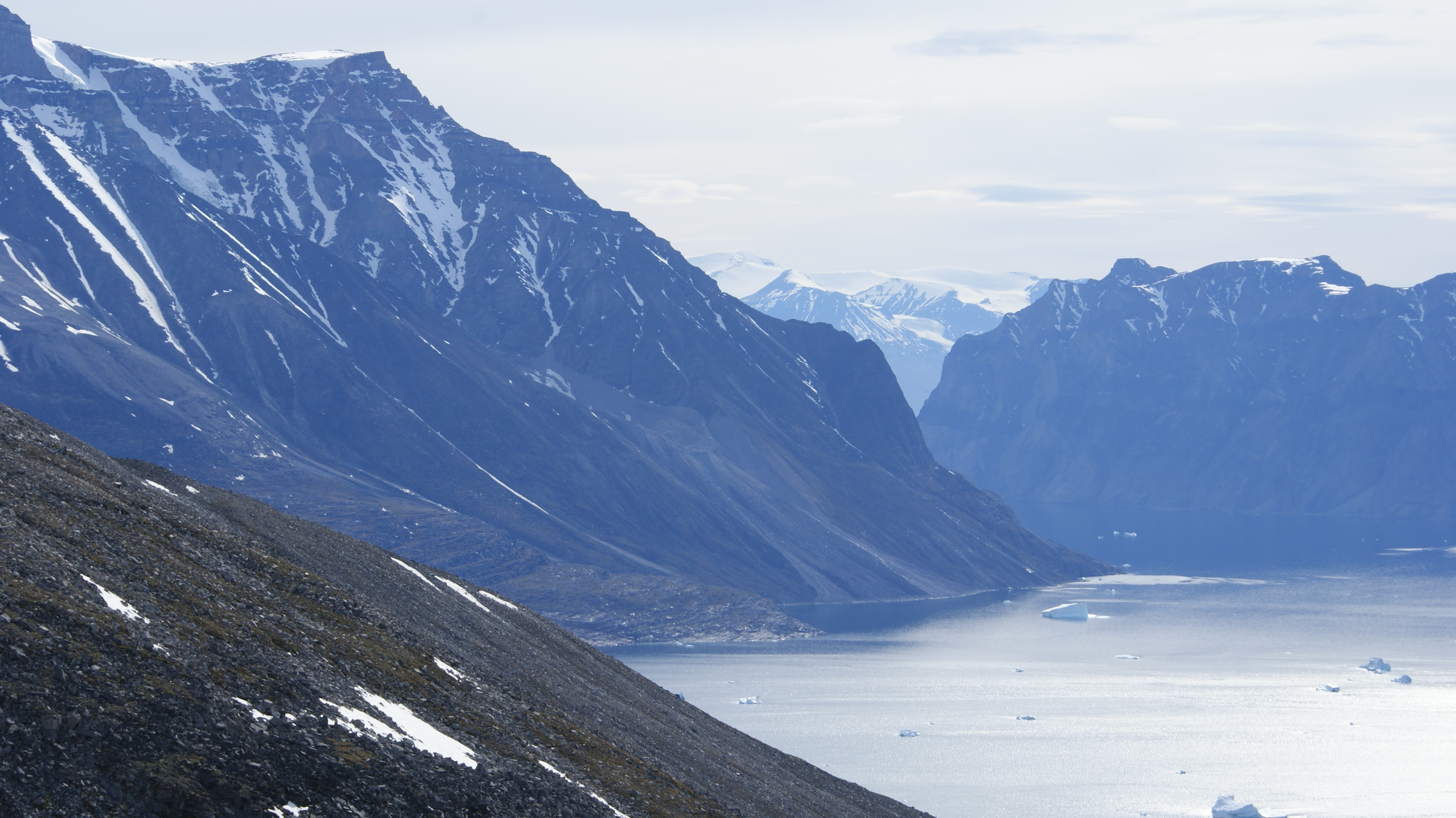
Appat Island (left) from the north

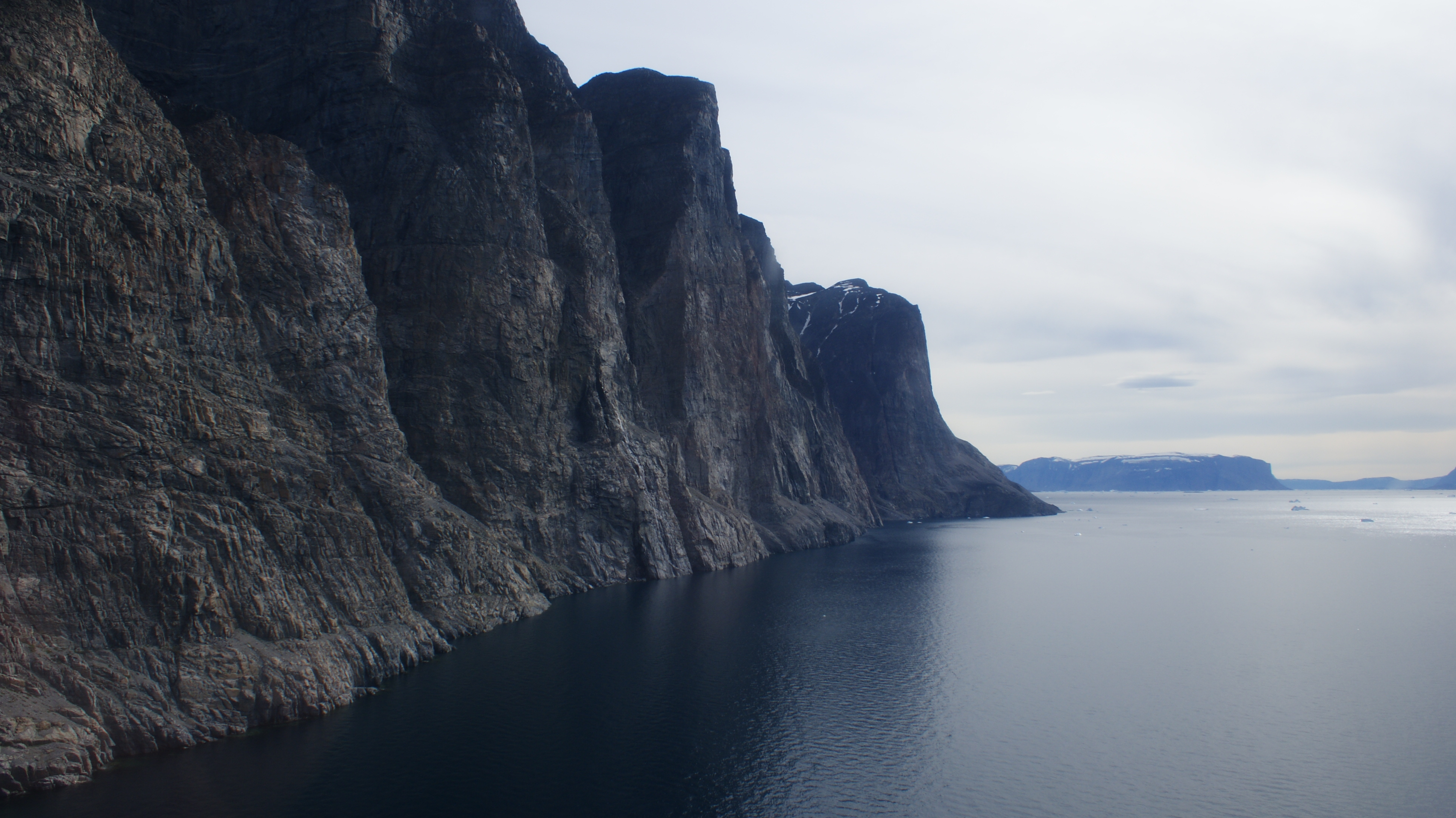
The southern shore of the island mostly consists of a series of precipitous walls

== Promontories ==
Name	Direction	Latitude N	Longitude W
Naakaleqaoq	Western Cape	70°53′45″	52°10′55″
Pania	Northern Cape	70°58′51″	52°02′35″
Uiffaq	Eastern Cape	70°52′32″	51°34′17″
Kangimut Sammissoq	Southern Cape	70°50′25″	51°40′50″

== Mining ==
Qaqortuatsiaq, located on the northern coast of Appat near the shore of the Torsukattak Strait, is a former marble quarry, now abandoned. Mining activities in the area are likely to resume in the future, providing an economic lifeline to the communities of the Uummannaq region, keeping the relatively new Qaarsut Airport open.

== Access ==
The island can be reached via individually chartered fishing boats from Saattut, the settlement on a skerry off the southeastern cape, or from Ukkusissat to the northwest. Package tourists visit the 'desert' on the cape as part of an organized tour from Uummannaq. Movement within the interior of Appat is restricted to mountaineering.

== See also ==
- List of islands of Greenland
