= Amaroq =

Mining company focussed on gold deposits in Greenland

- Type: Public
- Traded as: LSE: AMRQ
- Industry: Mining
- Founded: 2017; 9 years ago
- Founder: Eldur Olafsson
- Headquarters: Toronto, Canada
- Key people: Sigurbjorn Thorkelsson (chairman); Eldur Olafsson (CEO)
- Revenue: ▲CA$27.0 million (2025)
- Operating income: ▲CA$(18.2) million (2025)
- Net income: ▲CA$(18.8) million (2025)
- Website: www.amaroqminerals.com

Amaroq Limited is a mining company focussed on gold deposits in Greenland. It is listed on the London Stock Exchange and is a constituent of the FTSE 250 Index.

== History ==
The company was founded by Eldur Olafsson as Alopex Gold Inc. in 2017. Its shares were first listed on the TSX Venture Exchange in July 2017 and it then changed its name to AEX Gold Inc in June 2018.

It changed its name again from AEX Gold Inc to Amaroq Limited in June 2022 and then, in September 2023, it issued a significant tranche of debt to exploit its recently-purchased interest in the Nalunaq gold mine in southern Greenland. It then started pouring gold at the mine in November 2024.

The US Government, which regards Greenland as critical to its national and economic security, held talks with the company about a possible investment in January 2026.

The company cancelled its listing onto the TSX Venture Exchange and moved to the main market of the London Stock Exchange in July 2026.
