= Torsukattak Strait =

Strait in Greenland

Coordinates: 70°58′N 51°46′W

Location of Torsukattak Strait in the Uummannaq Fjord region

Torsukattak Strait (old spelling: Torssukátak) is a strait in Avannaata municipality in northwestern Greenland.

== Geography ==
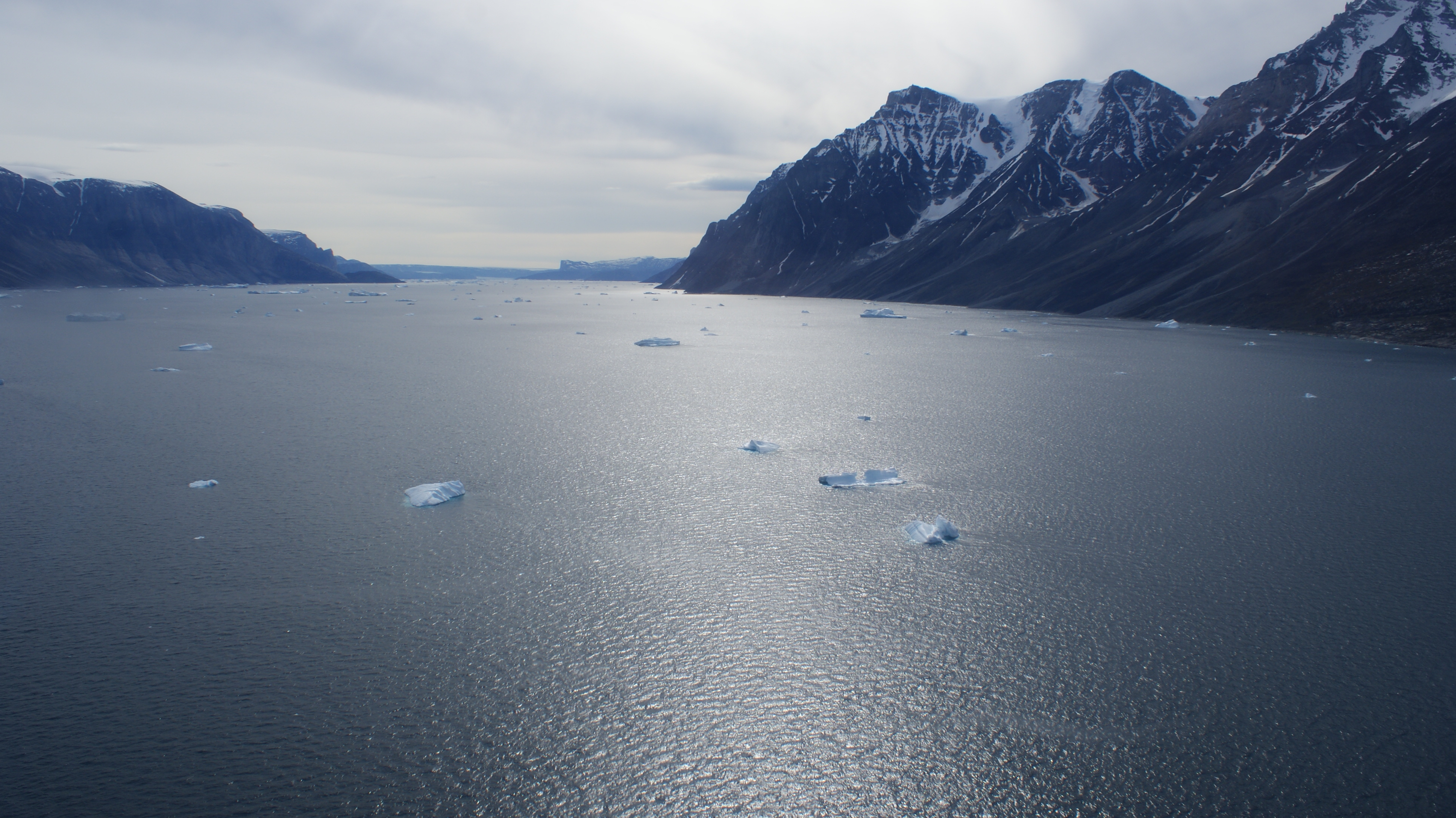
Aerial view of Torsukattak Strait from the west

Located in the northeastern part of Uummannaq Fjord, it separates the Ukkusissat Peninsula in the northeast from Appat Island in the southwest. The strait waterway is an extension of Itillarsuup Kangerlua fjord. Its northwestern mouth opens into the Uummannaq Fjord 4 km southwest of the Ukkusissat settlement.

== Mining ==
Qaqortuatsiaq, located on the northern coast of Appat Island near the shore of the strait is a former marble quarry, now abandoned. Mining activities in the area are likely to resume in the future, providing an economic lifeline to the communities of the Uummannaq region, keeping the relatively new Qaarsut Airport open.
