= Ukkusissat Heliport =

Heliport in Greenland

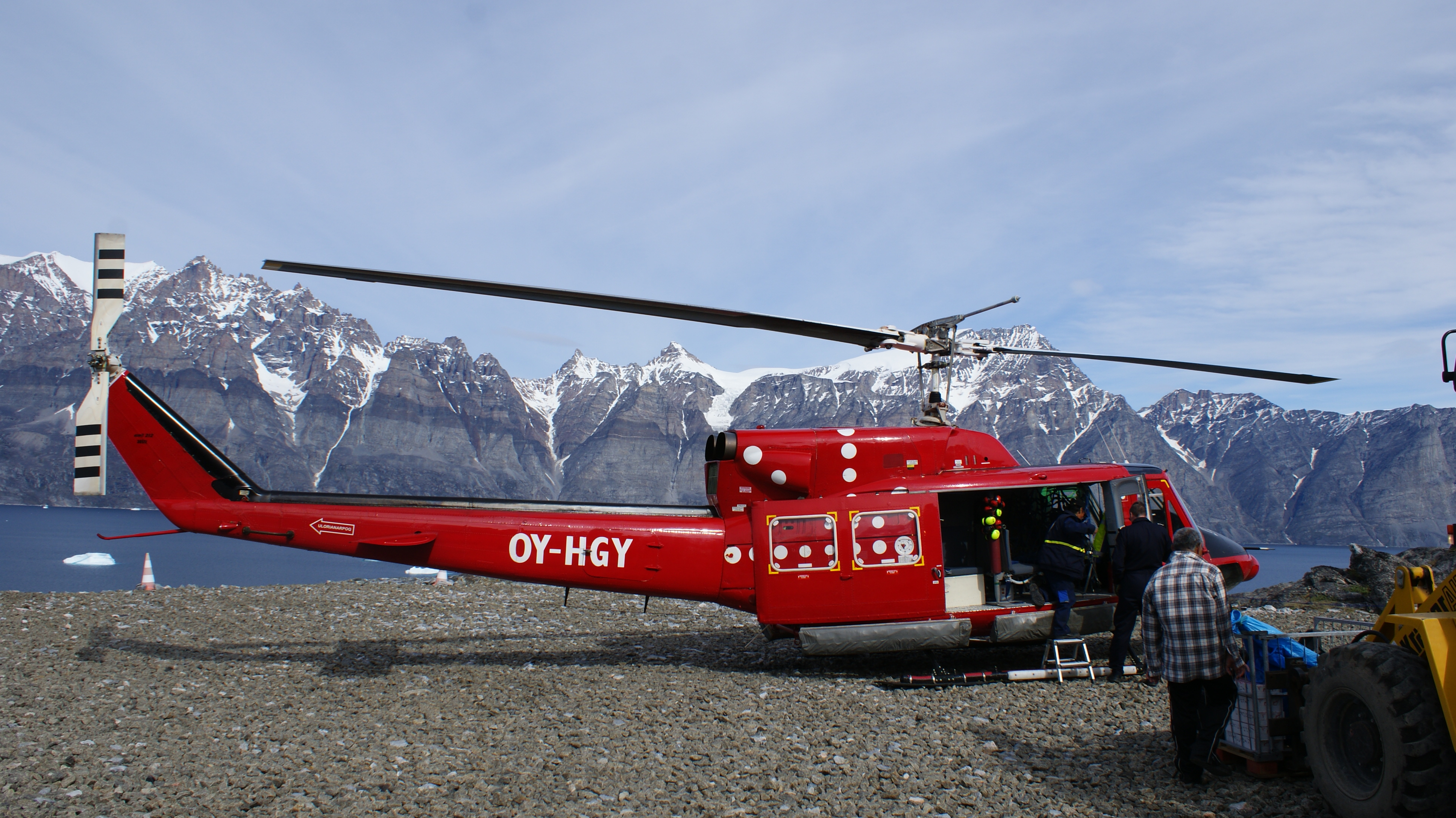
- Ukkusissat Heliport: Air Greenland Bell 212
- IATA: JUK; ICAO: BGUT; LID: UKK

Summary
- Airport type: Public
- Operator: Greenland Airport Authority (Mittarfeqarfiit)
- Serves: Ukkusissat, Greenland
- Elevation AMSL: 223 ft / 68 m
- Coordinates: 71°03′19″N 51°53′01″W
- Website: Ukkusissat Heliport

Map
- Location in Greenland

Helipads
| Number | Length | | Surface |
| Number | m | ft | Surface |
|---|---|---|---|
| 1 | 15 | 49 | Stones |
- Source: Danish AIS

Ukkusissat Heliport (IATA: JUK, ICAO: BGUT) is a heliport in Ukkusissat, a village in the Uummannaq Fjord system in the Avannaata municipality in northwestern Greenland. The heliport is considered a helistop, and is served by Air Greenland as part of a government contract. There are no facilities at the helistop; check-in is administered in the Pilersuisoq communal store, the central point of the settlement.

On the way from Uummannaq Heliport, Air Greenland helicopters fly alongside the southern and western wall of Appat Island, to then pass above the narrow Appat Ikerat strait between Appat and the smaller Salleq Island, a high, standalone flooded mountain.

== Airlines and destinations ==
| Airlines | Destinations |
|---|---|
| Air Greenland (settlement flights) | Uummannaq |

Air Greenland operates government contract flights to villages in the Uummannaq Fjord area. These mostly cargo flights are not featured in the timetable, although they can be pre-booked. Departure times for these flights as specified during booking are by definition approximate, with the settlement service optimized on the fly depending on local demand for a given day.

== Photographs ==
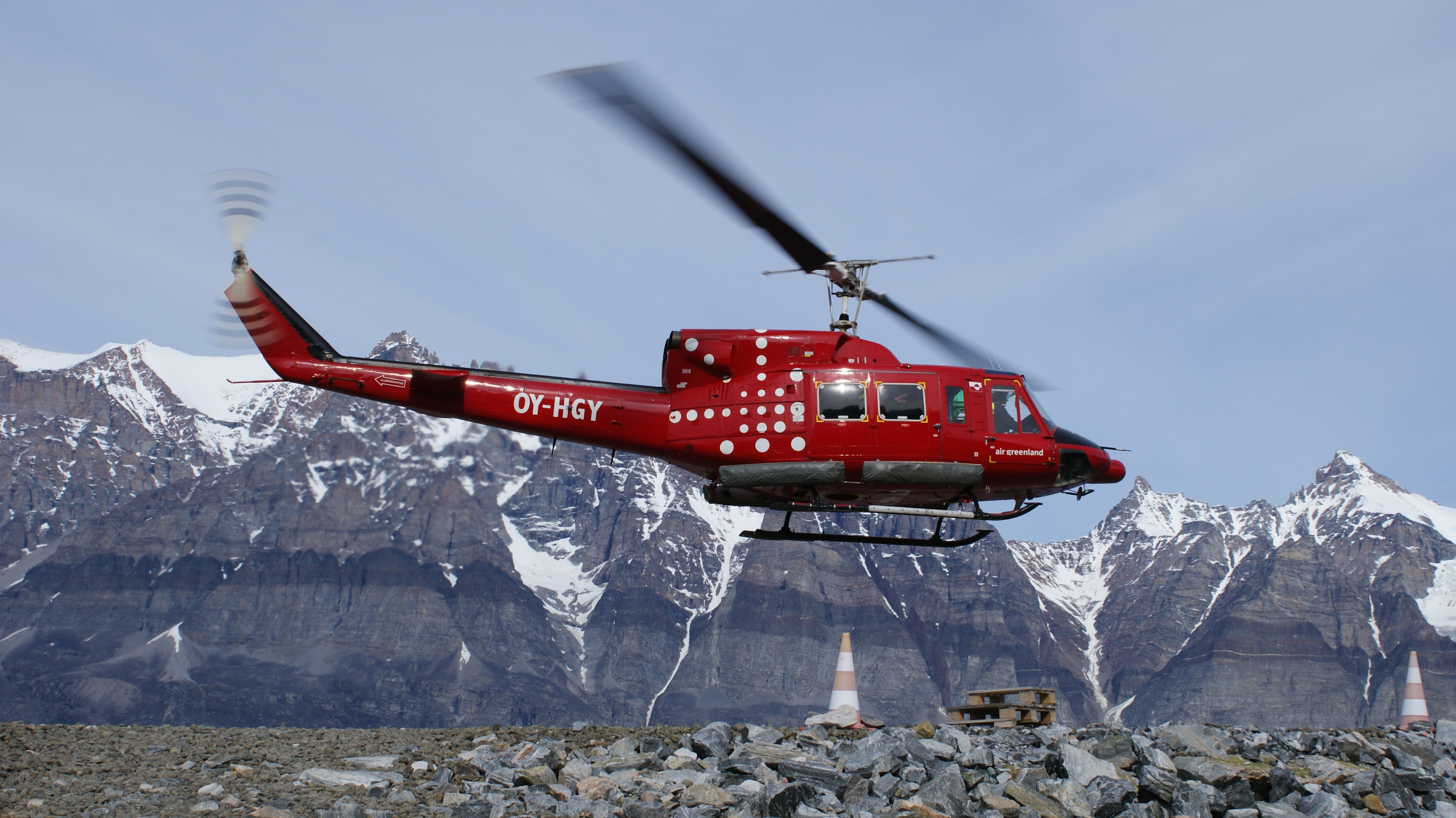
Air Greenland Bell 212 taking off

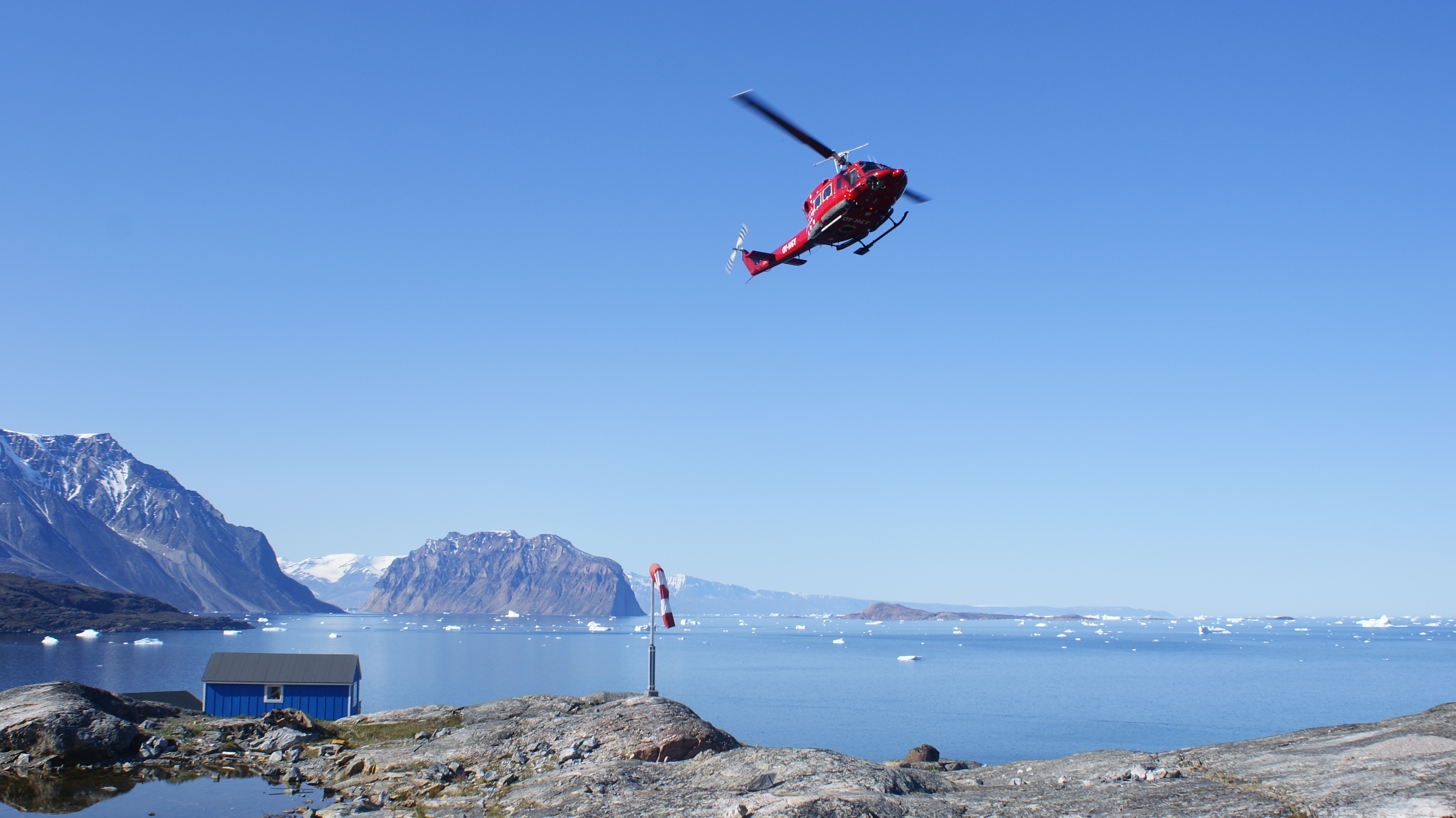
Air Greenland Bell 212 approaching the heliport from the south

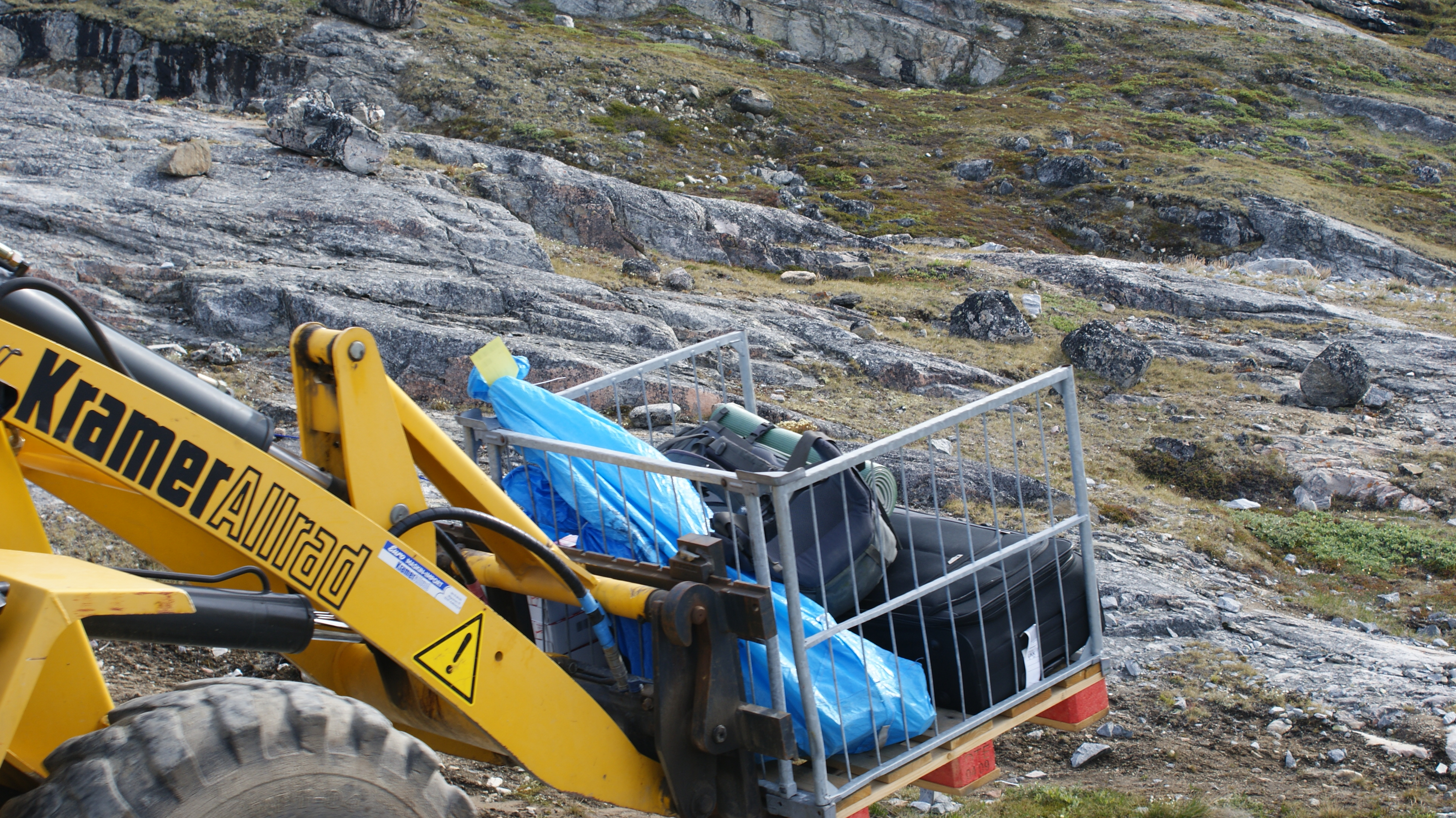
Baggage delivery: from the helipad to the Pilersuisoq store
