= Salleq Island =

Island in Greenland

Salleq
- Location of Salleq Island
- Interactive map of Salleq

Geography
- Location: Uummannaq Fjord
- Coordinates: 70°56′20″N 52°16′00″W

Administration
- Greenland
- Municipality: Avannaata

Salleq Island (old spelling: Sagdleq) is an uninhabited island in the Avannaata municipality in northwestern Greenland. It is located in the north-central part of the Uummannaq Fjord. The walls of the island feature characteristic multicolored bands of gneiss and granite layers.

Air Greenland helicopters approach Ukkusissat Heliport on the way from Uummannaq Heliport alongside the southern and western wall of the large Appat Island, to then pass above the narrow Appat Ikerat strait separating it from Salleq Island.

== Geography ==
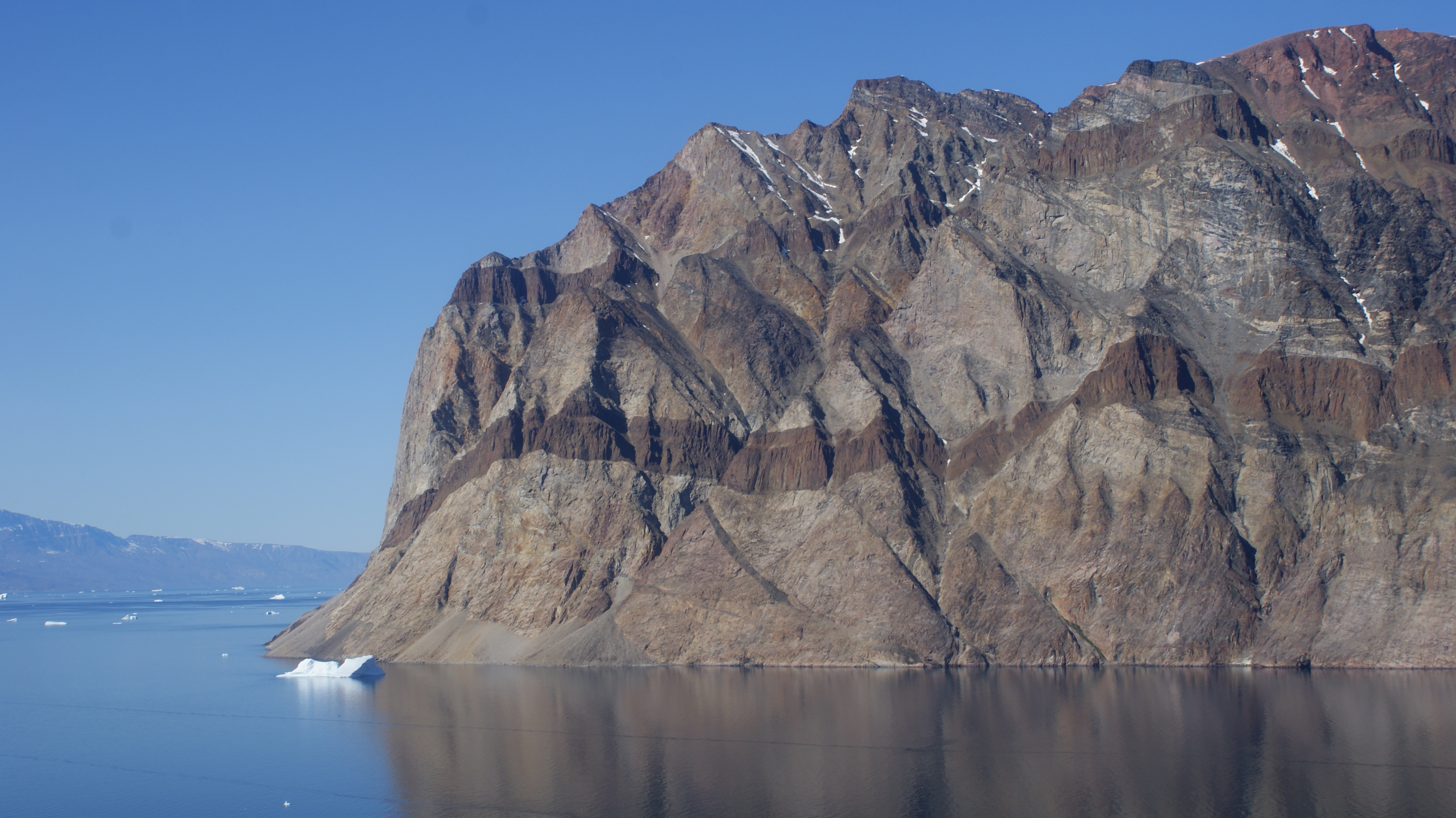
Rock strata of different color and age

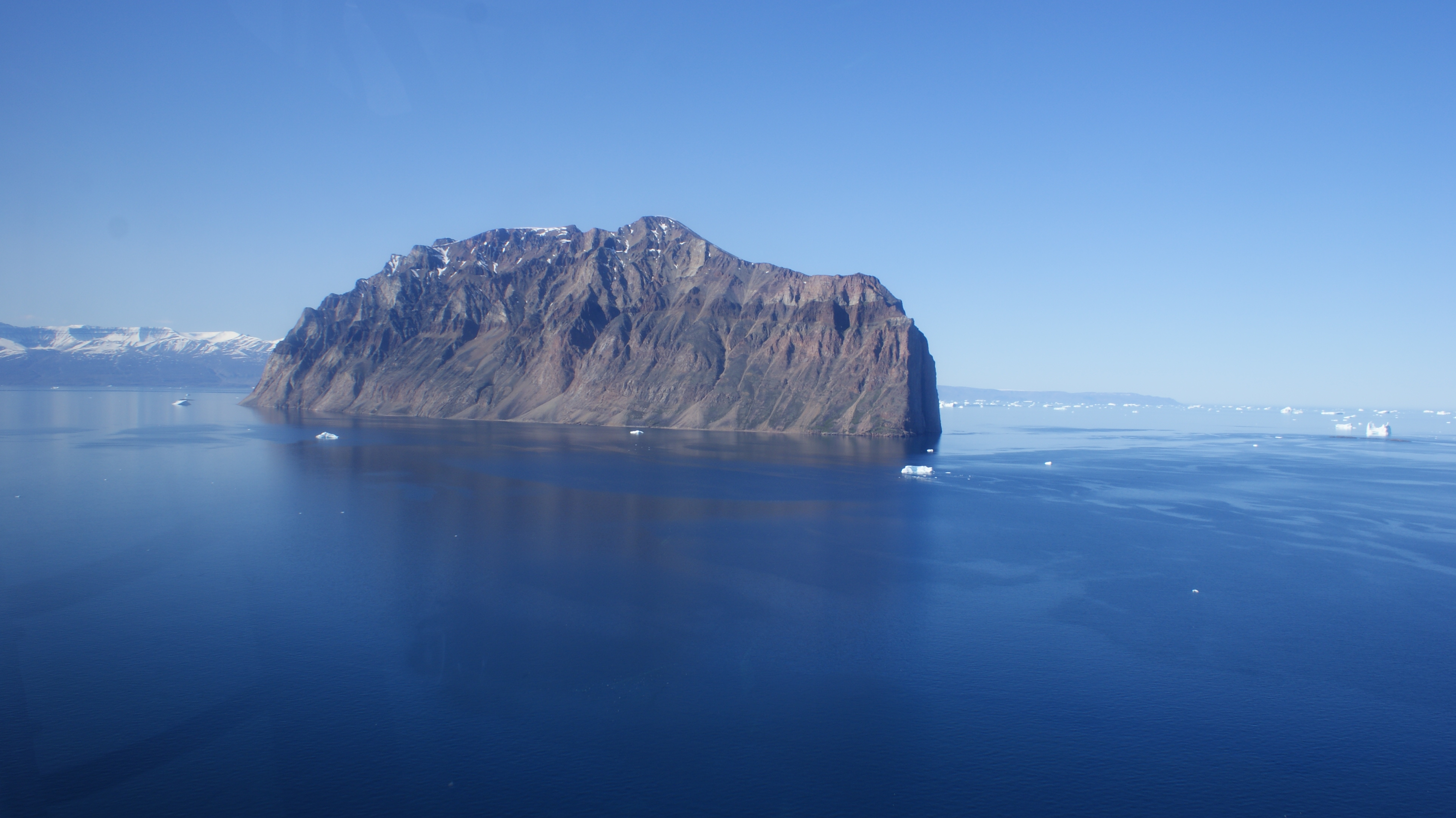
Aerial view of Salleq Island from the north

Salleq Island is separated from Uummannaq island and Salliaruseq Island in the south by the central arm of the Uummannaq Fjord, from the Appat Island in the east by the Appat Ikerat strait, and from the small archipelago of low-lying skerries of Qeqertat to the north by the Salliup Qeqertallo Ikerat strait.

The island is very mountainous, consisting of an isolated mountain peak, with precipitous walls falling from the summit (1,070 m (3,510.5 ft)) in all directions.

== Bird colony ==
Salleq is a breeding ground for fulmars and other seabirds. The island is also home to the largest colony of black guillemots in the Uummannaq Fjord region, with the population reaching 100,000 in 1949. The island is inaccessible from all sides, and has been a designated nature reserve, with access to the shores forbidden during the summer season, from the beginning of June to the end of August.
