= List of airports in Greenland =

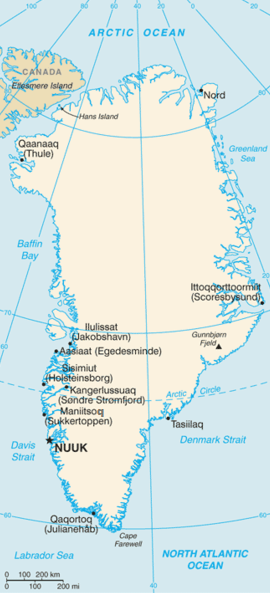
Map of Greenland

This is a list of airports in Greenland, grouped by type and sorted by location. Air travel is extremely important in Greenland, since there are generally no roads between settlements. Arctic Umiaq Line provides passenger and freight services by sea but is limited to the southwest coast and travel time is long and departures sparse.

== History ==
The first airports in Greenland were built by and for the United States defense. The first and largest was Kangerlussuaq Airport in 1941, followed by Narsarsuaq Airport in 1942 (and now-abandoned USAAF airfields Bluie East Two and Marrak Point, both in 1942) and Pituffik Space Base in 1953 (although Pituffik is not operated as a civilian airport) and Kulusuk Airport in 1956. Due to their distance from major settlements, these were not initially used for civilian travel. In the early 1960s, Greenlandair was founded, commencing civilian flights between the air bases, and helicopter and sea plane flights to large settlements. SAS operated the connection from Copenhagen to Kangerlussuaq, beginning in 1954 as a fuel stop en route to United States, which was later taken over in 2000 by Greenlandair (today called Air Greenland].

Beginning with Nuuk Airport in 1979 and Ilulissat Airport in 1983, several airports with short runways were built.

In 2025, Nuuk International Airport and, in 2026, Ilulissat International Airport, each equipped with 2,200-meter runways, will assume the role formerly held by Kangerlussuaq Airport as Greenland’s primary hubs for transatlantic and international air traffic with by among Air Greenlands new Airbus A330neo and A320neo. These airports will facilitate direct intercontinental connections between Europe, Greenland, and the rest of North America, with the potential for future intercontinental routes to Asia, including stopovers that may support tourism and local connectivity within the country.

== Airports ==
Location of airports. Airports in red have international flights (may be seasonal).

Many locations in Greenland have Danish names in addition to their Greenlandic names. The Danish name, where applicable, is shown in italics. Airport or heliport names shown in bold indicate the facility has scheduled passenger service on a commercial airline.

Several of the airports do not have road connection with the local major settlement, so a helicopter transfer is often needed by most passengers to some airports. Airports with a very small population reachable by road include Kangerlussuaq Airport, Kulusuk Airport, Nerlerit Inaat Airport and Qaarsut Airport. 13 civil airports (not Pituffik Space Base) and 47 helipads in Greenland are operated by the state-owned enterprise Greenland Airport Authority (Mittarfeqarfiit).

=== Aerodromes ===
The following 14 airports are listed under AD 2 AERODROMES at Naviair.

Location served	Municipality	ICAO	IATA	Airport name	Reference
Aasiaat (Egedesminde)	Qeqertalik	BGAA	JEG	**Aasiaat Airport**	
Ilulissat (Jakobshavn)	Avannaata	BGJN	JAV	**Ilulissat Airport**	
Ittoqqortoormiit (Scoresbysund)	Sermersooq	BGCO	CNP	**Nerlerit Inaat Airport** (Constable Pynt Airport)	
Kangerlussuaq (Søndre Strømfjord)	Qeqqata	BGSF	SFJ	**Kangerlussuaq Airport** (Sondrestrom Air Base)	
Kulusuk	Sermersooq	BGKK	KUS	**Kulusuk Airport**	
Maniitsoq (Sukkertoppen)	Qeqqata	BGMQ	JSU	**Maniitsoq Airport**	
Nuuk (Godthåb)	Sermersooq	BGGH	GOH	**Nuuk Airport**	
Paamiut (Frederikshåb)	Sermersooq	BGPT	JFR	**Paamiut Airport**	
Pituffik	–	BGTL	THU	**Pituffik Space Base**	
Qaanaaq	Avannaata	BGQQ	NAQ	**Qaanaaq Airport**	
Qaarsut / Uummannaq	Avannaata	BGUQ	JQA	**Qaarsut Airport** (Uummannaq Airport)	
Qaqortoq (Julianehåb)	Kujalleq	BGQO	JJU	**Qaqortoq Airport**	
Sisimiut (Holsteinsborg)	Qeqqata	BGSS	JHS	**Sisimiut Airport**	
Upernavik	Avannaata	BGUK	JUV	**Upernavik Airport**	

The following aerodromes also exist. They have no scheduled flights.

Location served	Municipality	ICAO	IATA	Airport name
Daneborg	Northeast Greenland National Park	BGDB		Daneborg Airport
Danmarkshavn	Northeast Greenland National Park	BGDH		Danmarkshavn Airport
Station Nord	Northeast Greenland National Park	BGNO		Nord Station
EastGRIP	Northeast Greenland National Park			EastGRIP
Summit Camp	Northeast Greenland National Park			Summit Station
Mestersvig	Northeast Greenland National Park	BGMV		Mestersvig Airport

Not included and not open for flights anymore are the former United States Army Air Forces bases of Bluie East Two and Marrak Point.

=== Heliports ===
The following 47 heliports are listed under AD 4 HELIPORTS at Naviair.

Location served	Municipality	ICAO	IATA	Airport name	Reference
Aappilattoq	Kujalleq	BGAQ	QUV	Aappilattoq Heliport (Kujalleq)	
Aappilattoq	Avannaata	BGAG	AOQ	Aappilattoq Heliport (Avannaata) (non-IATA identifier: AAP)	
Akunnaaq	Qeqertalik	BGAK		Akunnaaq Heliport	
Alluitsup Paa (Sydprøven)	Kujalleq	BGAP	LLU	**Alluitsup Paa Heliport**	
Ammassivik (Sletten)	Kujalleq	BGAS	QUW	Ammassivik Heliport	
Arsuk	Sermersooq	BGAR	JRK	Arsuk Heliport	
Attu	Qeqertalik	BGAT		Attu Heliport	
Eqalugaarsuit	Kujalleq	BGET	QFG	Eqalugaarsuit Heliport	
Iginniarfik	Qeqertalik	BGIG		Iginniarfik Heliport	
Ikamiut	Qeqertalik	BGIT		Ikamiut Heliport	
Ikerasaarsuk	Qeqertalik	BGIK		Ikerasaarsuk Heliport	
Ikerasak	Avannaata	BGIA		Ikerasak Heliport (non-IATA identifier: IKE)	
Ilimanaq (Claushavn)	Avannaata	BGIL		Ilimanaq Heliport	
Illorsuit	Avannaata	BGLL	IOT	Illorsuit Heliport (non-IATA identifier: ILL)	
Innaarsuit	Avannaata	BGIN	IUI	Innaarsuit Heliport	
Isertoq	Sermersooq	BGIS		Isortoq Heliport (non-IATA identifier: IOQ)	
Ittoqqortoormiit (Scoresbysund)	Sermersooq	BGSC	OBY	Ittoqqortoormiit Heliport	
Kangaatsiaq	Qeqertalik	BGKA		Kangaatsiaq Heliport	
Kangersuatsiaq (Prøven)	Avannaata	BGKS	KGQ	Kangersuatsiaq Heliport (non-IATA identifier: KAQ)	
Kitsissuarsuit (Hunde Ejlande)	Qeqertalik	BGKT		Kitsissuarsuit Heliport	
Kullorsuaq	Avannaata	BGKQ	KHQ	Kullorsuaq Heliport (non-IATA identifier: KLQ)	
Kuummiit	Sermersooq	BGKM		Kuummiit Heliport	
Nalunaq (Nalunaq gold mine)	Kujalleq	BGNL		Nalunaq Heliport	
Nanortalik	Kujalleq	BGNN	JNN	**Nanortalik Heliport**	
Narsaq	Kujalleq	BGNS	JNS	**Narsaq Heliport**	
Narsaq Kujalleq (Frederiksdal)	Kujalleq	BGFD	QFN	Narsaq Kujalleq Heliport	
Narsarsuaq	Kujalleq	BGBW	UAK	**Narsarsuaq Airport**	
Niaqornaarsuk	Qeqertalik	BGNK		Niaqornaarsuk Heliport	
Niaqornat	Avannaata	BGNT	NIQ	Niaqornat Heliport	
Nuugaatsiaq	Avannaata	BGNQ	JUU	Nuugaatsiaq Heliport (non-IATA identifier: NUG)	
Nuussuaq (Kraulshavn)	Avannaata	BGNU	NSQ	Nuussuaq Heliport (non-IATA identifier: NUS)	
Qasigiannguit (Christianshåb)	Qeqertalik	BGCH	JCH	**Qasigiannguit Heliport**	
Qassimiut	Kujalleq	BGQT	QJH	Qassimiut Heliport	
Qeqertaq	Avannaata	BGQE		Qeqertaq Heliport (non-IATA identifier: QQT)	
Qeqertarsuaq (Godhavn)	Qeqertalik	BGGN	JGO	**Qeqertarsuaq Heliport**	
Saattut	Avannaata	BGST	SAE	Saattut Heliport (non-IATA identifier: SAA)	
Saqqaq (Solsiden)	Avannaata	BGSQ		Saqqaq Heliport (non-IATA identifier: QUP)	
Savissivik	Avannaata	BGSV	SVR	Savissivik Heliport	
Sermiligaaq	Sermersooq	BGSG		Sermiligaaq Heliport	
Siorapaluk	Avannaata	BGSI	SRK	Siorapaluk Heliport	
Tasiilaq	Sermersooq	BGAM	AGM	**Tasiilaq Heliport** (Ammassalik Heliport)	
Tasiusaq	Kujalleq (was Nanortalik)	BGTQ		Tasiusaq Heliport (Kujalleq)	
Tasiusaq	Avannaata (was Upernavik)	BGTA	TQA	Tasiusaq Heliport (Avannaata)	
Tiilerilaaq	Sermersooq	BGTN	TQI	Tiniteqilaaq Heliport	
Ukkusissat	Avannaata	BGUT	JUK	Ukkusissat Heliport (non-IATA identifier: UKK)	
Upernavik Kujalleq (Søndre Upernavik)	Avannaata	BGKL		Upernavik Kujalleq Heliport (non-IATA identifier: UPK)	
Uummannaq	Avannaata	BGUM	UMD	**Uummannaq Heliport**	

The following four heliports are not listed by Naviair.

Location served	Municipality	ICAO	IATA	Airport name	Reference
Igaliku	Kujalleq	BGIO	QFX	Igaliku Heliport	
Kangilinnguit (Grønnedal)	Sermersooq	BGGD	JGR	Kangilinnguit Heliport	
Moriusaq	Avannaata	BGMO		Moriusaq Heliport	
Saarloq	Kujalleq	BGSO		Saarloq Heliport (non-IATA identifier: QOQ)	

=== Statistics ===
Mittarfeqarfiit only publishes statistics summarized for Atlantic airports (Kangerlussuaq and Narsarsuaq) and for other airports (11 airports). 13 airports are included, not Pituffik Space Base.

	2013	2015	2017	2019
Atlantic airports, passengers	159,432	166,688	173,523	197,038
Other airports, passengers	193,812	198,921	200,075	217,173
Heliports, passengers	44,612	41,675	39,789	28,790
Atlantic airports, takeoffs	7,988	8,286	7,653	8,209
Other airports, takeoffs	15,069	16,007	16,958	15,691
Heliports, takeoffs	10,646	11,289	9,533	7,623

== Future ==
A major development in Greenlandic aviation occurred in 2016, when it was decided that three new or rebuilt airports would be built in Nuuk, Ilulissat and Qaqortoq. These airports will accommodate larger jet aircraft which can serve international destinations, at a cost of 3.6 billion DKK (approximately $560 million), primarily financed by the Danish state. This will majorly improve access to Greenland's largest towns and end the use of ill-placed prior military bases as aviation hubs. Kangerlussuaq Airport will lose hub status to Nuuk Airport and Ilulissat Airport.

The first of the new airports, Nuuk Airport, was opened in 2024 and subsequently most international traffic transitioned there. Qaqortoq Airport commenced operations on 16 April 2026, replacing Narsarsuaq Airport, with the remaining airport, Ilulissat, due to open later in 2026.

== See also ==
- Greenland Airports
- Transport in Greenland
- Danish Civil Aviation and Railway Authority
- Air Greenland
- Icelandair
