= List of members of the Greenland Provincial Council, 1951–60 =

The first Provincial Council to be elected by direct suffrage was elected on 29 June 1951 (excepting Upernavik on account of snow and Nanortalik on account of the island's first measles outbreak) and opened on 25 September 1951. It was the first Greenlandic election to permit female suffrage. During the first election season, there were no parties but some cliques formed among economic groups; all told, turnout was about 6,400 from an eligible population of about 8,750.

| Constituency | Name | Occupation |
|---|---|---|
| Nanortalik | Jacob Nielsen | outpost manager |
| Julianehåb | Frederik Nielsen | schoolmaster |
| Frederikshåb | Gerhard Egede | clergyman |
| Narssaq | Abel Kristiansen | catechist |
| Godthåb | Augo Lynge | schoolmaster |
| Sukkertoppen | Peter Egede | outpost manager |
| Holsteinsborg | Knud Olsen | shop assistant |
| Kangatsiaq | Nikolai Rosing | outpost manager |
| Egedesminde | Frederik Lynge | ex-colony manager |
| Disko Bugt (Christianshåb & Jakobshavn) | Marius Sivertsen | trade assistant |
| Disko (Godhavn & Qutdligssat) | Jens Olsen | clergyman |
| Umanaq | Peter Fleischer | outpost manager |
| Upernavik | Hendrik Olsen | trade assistant |

All were native-born Greenlanders and employees of the Greenland Administration. They selected Augo Lynge and Frederik Nielson to represent Greenland in the Danish Parliament and Frederik Lynge to represent it on the board of the Royal Greenland Trading Department.
