= Iginniarfik =

- Location within Greenland
- Coordinates: 68°08′53″N 53°10′20″W
- State: Kingdom of Denmark
- Constituent country: Greenland
- Municipality: Qeqertalik

Population (2025)
  - Total: 60
- Time zone: UTC−02:00 (Western Greenland Time)
  - Summer (DST): UTC−01:00 (Western Greenland Summer Time)
- Postal code: 3955 Kangaatsiaq

Iginniarfik is a village in the municipality of Qeqertalik, in western Greenland. Its population was 76 in 2020.

== Transport ==
Air Greenland serves the village as part of government contract, with winter-only helicopter flights from Iginniarfik Heliport to Ikerasaarsuk Heliport and Kangaatsiaq Heliport. Settlement flights in the Aasiaat Archipelago are unique in that they are operated only during winter and spring.

During summer and autumn, when the waters of Disko Bay are navigable, communication between settlements is by sea only, serviced by Diskoline. The ferry links Iginniarfik with Kangaatsiaq, Attu, Ikerasaarsuk, Niaqornaarsuk, and Aasiaat.

== Population ==
The population of Iginniarfik has been stable in the last two decades.

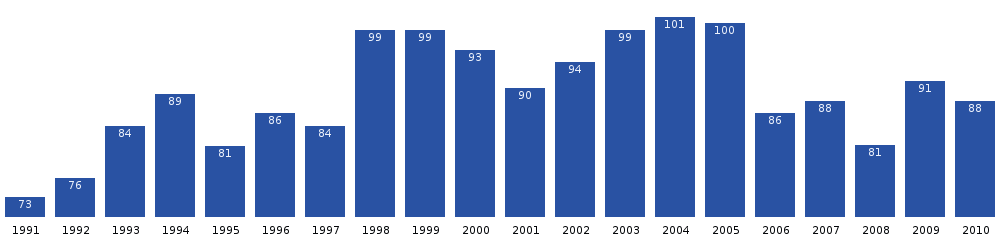
Iginniarfik population growth dynamics in the last two decades. Source: Statistics Greenland
