= Niaqornaarsuk =

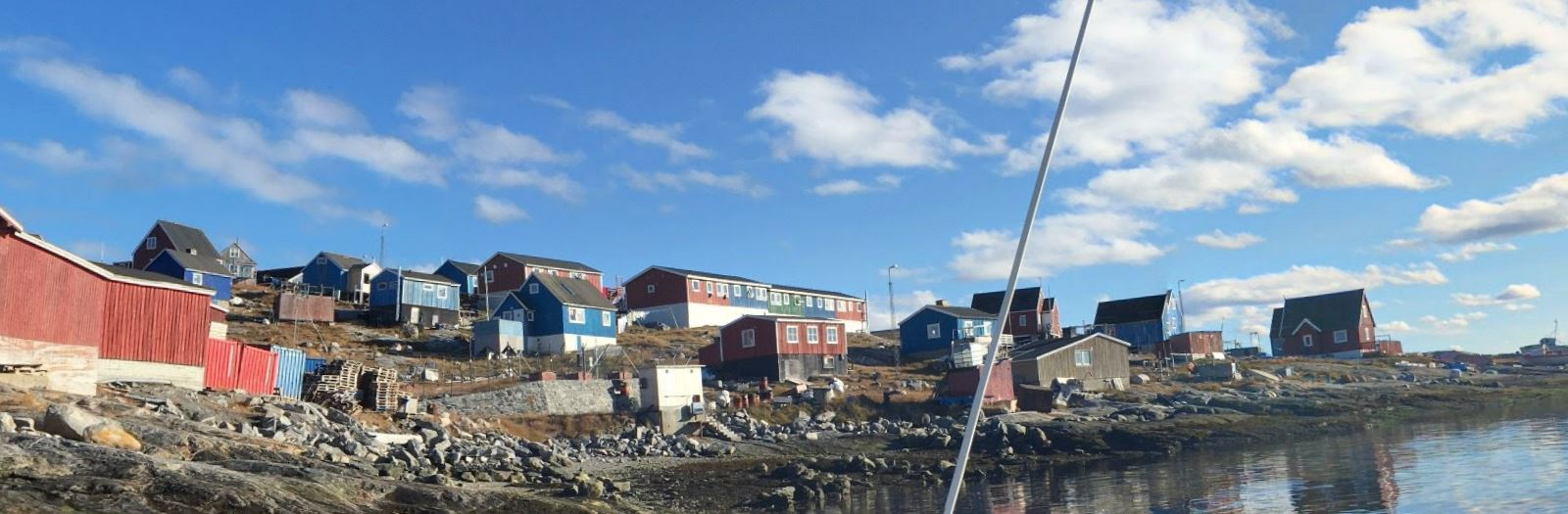

- Location within Greenland
- Coordinates: 68°13′56″N 52°51′30″W
- State: Kingdom of Denmark
- Constituent country: Greenland
- Municipality: Qeqertalik

Population (2020)
  - Total: 249
- Time zone: UTC−02:00 (Western Greenland Time)
  - Summer (DST): UTC−01:00 (Western Greenland Summer Time)
- Postal code: 3955 Kangaatsiaq

Niaqornaarsuk (Greenlandic pronunciation: [niɑqɔnːɑːsːuk]) is a village in the Qeqertalik municipality in western Greenland, along the northern entrance to Arfersiorfik Fjord. Its population was 249 in 2020.

== Transport ==
Air Greenland serves the village as part of government contract, with winter-only helicopter flights from Niaqornaarsuk Heliport to Aasiaat Airport and Kangaatsiaq Heliport. Settlement flights in the Aasiaat Archipelago are unique in that they are operated only during winter and spring.

During summer and autumn, when the waters of Disko Bay are navigable, communication between settlements is by sea only, serviced by Diskoline. The ferry links Niaqornaarsuk with Kangaatsiaq, Attu, Iginniarfik, Ikerasaarsuk, and Aasiaat.

== Population ==
The population of Niaqornaarsuk has fluctuated over the last two decades, decreasing in the 2000s.

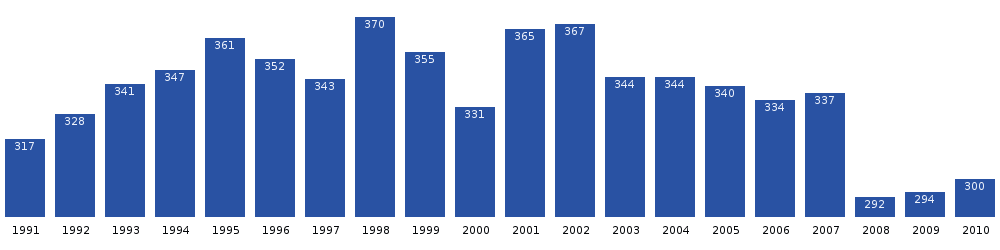
Niaqornaarsuk population growth dynamics in the last two decades. Source: Statistics Greenland
