= 1963 Greenlandic Provincial Council election =

- 28 June 1963
- All 16 seats in the Provincial Council (plus compensatory seats)
- Turnout: 54.05%
| Party | Seats | +/– |
|---|---|---|
| Independents | 16 | 0 |
This lists parties that won seats. See the complete results below.

Provincial Council elections were held in Greenland on 28 June 1963. Independents won all 16 seats.

== Electoral system ==
Members of the Provincial Council were elected by first-past-the-post voting in 16 single-member constituencies. Political parties or lists were entitled to compensatory seats if they received more than one-sixteenth of the valid votes cast (6.25%).

== Results ==
| Party | Votes | % | Seats |
|---|---|---|---|
| Independents | | | 16 |
| Total | | | 16 |
| Valid votes | 7,996 | 97.51 | |
| Invalid/blank votes | 204 | 2.49 | |
| Total votes | 8,200 | 100.00 | |
| Registered voters/turnout | 15,170 | 54.05 | |
Source: Atuagagdliutit, Danmarks Statistik

=== Elected members ===
| Constituency | Elected member |
|---|---|
| Aasiaat | Hans Lynge |
| Angmagssalik | Jørgen Borchersen |
| Attu | Lars Ostermann |
| Ilulissat | Ricard Petersen |
| Ittoqqortoormiit | Magtikalaat Arqe |
| Maniitsoq | Alibak Josefsen |
| Narsaq | Erik Egede |
| Nuuk | Peter K. S. Heilmann |
| Paamiut | Anthon Petersen |
| Qaqortoq | Oluf Høegh |
| Qullissat | Andreas Nielsen |
| Sisimiut | Jørgen C. F. Olsen |
| Tasiusaq | Jørgen Poulsen |
| Thule | Peter Jensen |
| Upernavik | Knud Kristiansen |
| Uummannaq | Elisabeth Johansen |
Source: Kjœr Sørensen

== Aftermath ==
Ricard Petersen and Magtikalaat Arqe were unable to attend sessions in May 1965, with Marius Sivertsen and Sivert Petersen acting as substitutes; Petersen acted as a substitute for Arqe again in March 1966. Jørgen Borchersen was replaced by Harald Ignatiussen for sessions in autumn 1966.
