= Ikerasaarsuk =

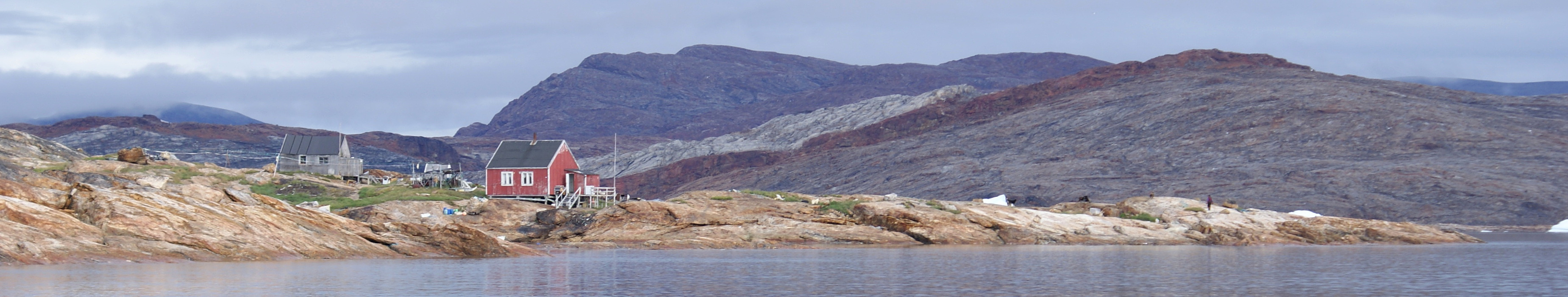

- Location within Greenland
- Coordinates: 68°08′25″N 53°26′40″W
- State: Kingdom of Denmark
- Constituent country: Greenland
- Municipality: Qeqertalik

Population (2021)
  - Total: 98
- Time zone: UTC−02:00 (Western Greenland Time)
  - Summer (DST): UTC−01:00 (Western Greenland Summer Time)
- Postal code: 3955 Kangaatsiaq

Ikerasaarsuk is a village in Qeqertalik municipality in western Greenland. Previously known as Ikerakuuk, its population was 98 in 2021.

== Transport ==
Air Greenland serves the village as part of government contract, with winter-only helicopter flights from Ikerasaarsuk Heliport to Iginniarfik Heliport and Kangaatsiaq Heliport. Settlement flights in the Aasiaat Archipelago are unique in that they are operated only during winter and spring.

During summer and autumn, when the waters of Disko Bay are navigable, communication between settlements is by sea only, serviced by Diskoline. The ferry links Ikerasaarsuk with Kangaatsiaq, Attu, Iginniarfik, Niaqornaarsuk, and Aasiaat.

== Population ==
The population of Ikerasaarsuk has been stable in the last two decades, increasing by half since 1990, and levelling off in the 2000s.

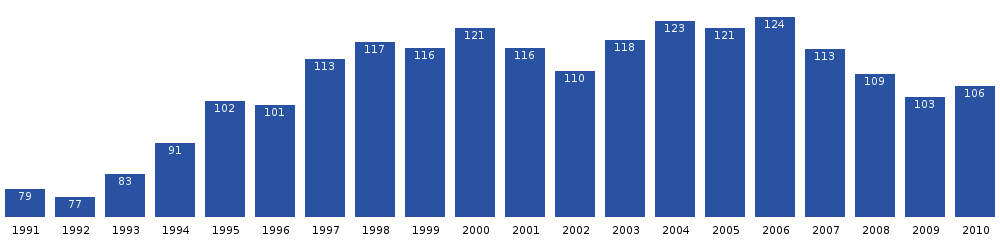
Ikerasaarsuk population growth dynamics in the last two decades. Source: Statistics Greenland
