= Ikamiut =

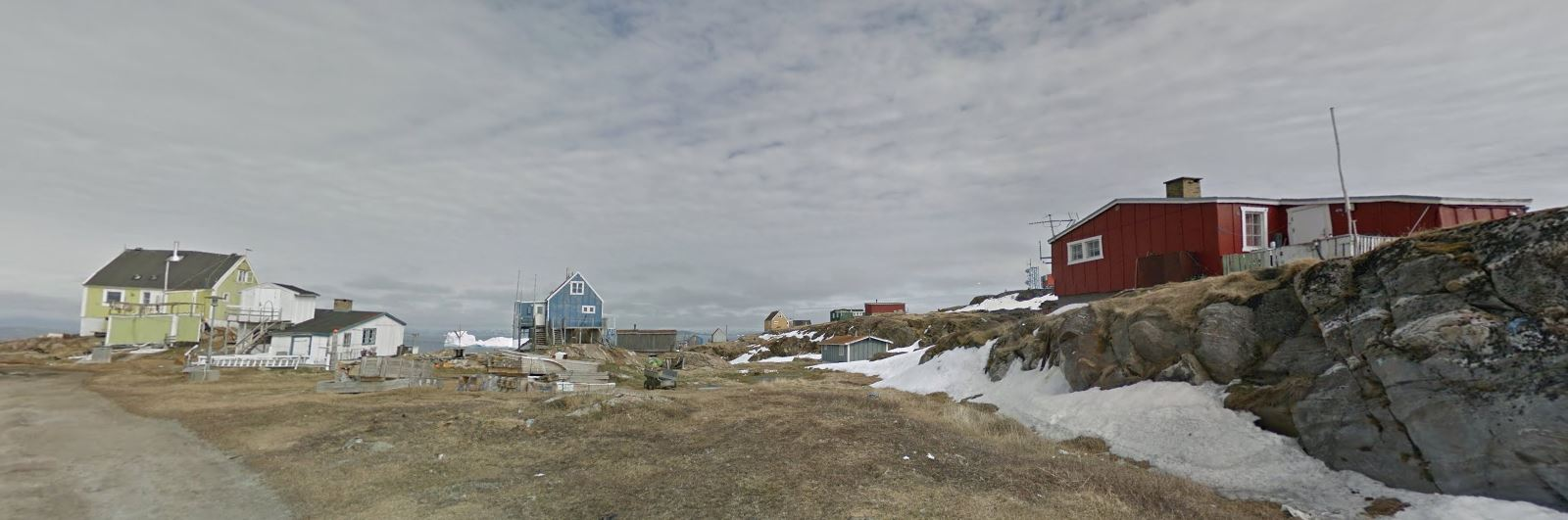
- Ikamiut

- Location within Greenland
- Coordinates: 68°38′00″N 51°49′58″W
- State: Kingdom of Denmark
- Constituent country: Greenland
- Municipality: Qeqertalik

Government
  - Mayor: Emil Zeeb

Population (2025)
  - Total: 83
- Time zone: UTC−02:00 (Western Greenland Time)
  - Summer (DST): UTC−01:00 (Western Greenland Summer Time)
- Postal code: 3951 Qasigiannguit

Ikamiut is a settlement in the Qeqertalik municipality in western Greenland, located on a small island in the Aasiaat Archipelago on the southern shores of Disko Bay. Its population was 86 in 2020.

== Transport ==
Air Greenland serves the village as part of government contract, with winter-only helicopter flights from Ikamiut Heliport to Aasiaat Airport and Qasigiannguit Heliport. Settlement flights in the Disko Bay region are unique in that they are operated only during winter and spring.

During summer and autumn, when the waters of the bay are navigable, communication between settlements is by sea only, serviced by Diskoline. The ferry links Ikamiut with Qasigiannguit, Aasiaat, and Akunnaaq.

== Population ==
The population of Ikamiut has been stable in the last two decades.

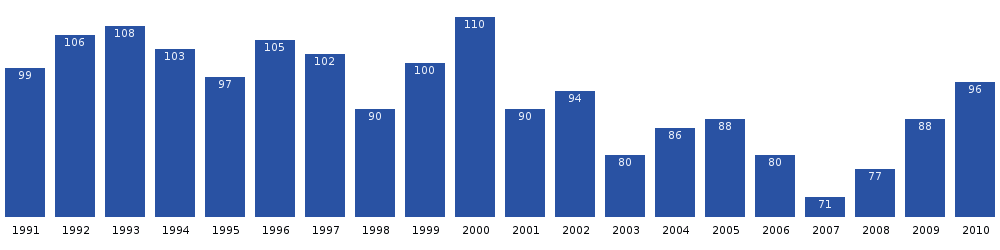
Ikamiut population growth dynamics in the last two decades. Source: Statistics Greenland
