= Arfersiorfik Fjord =

Fjord along the western coast of Greenland

- Location in Greenland
- Location: Arctic (West Greenland)
- Coordinates: 68.05°N 51.97°W
- Ocean/sea sources: Davis Strait
- Basin countries: Greenland
- Max. length: 152 km (94 mi)
- Max. width: 7 km (4.3 mi)
- Settlements: Niaqornaarsuk

Arfersiorfik Fjord is a large fjord along the western coast of Greenland, between the town of Aasiaat to the north and Nordre Strømfjord to the south. The name of this inlet means "the place where the whale was sighted".

== Geography ==
The entrance to the fjord is on the Davis Strait, and it extends eastward for a distance of 152 kilometres (94 mi) to the inland ice sheet. The islands of Qorsunnitsoq and Tunertooq are on the northern side midway within the fjord. Located along the northern shore of the fjord, near the entrance, is the settlement of Niaqornaarsuk.

== See also ==
- List of fjords of Greenland
