= Ikamiut Heliport =

Heliport in Greenland

- IATA: QJI; ICAO: BGIT

Summary
- Airport type: Public
- Operator: Greenland Airport Authority (Mittarfeqarfiit)
- Serves: Ikamiut, Greenland
- Elevation AMSL: 49 ft / 15 m
- Coordinates: 68°37′56″N 051°50′01″W
- Website: Ikamiut Heliport

Map
- Location in Greenland

Helipads
Number	Length		Surface
Number	m	ft	Surface
1	15	49	Gravel
- Source: Danish AIS

Ikamiut Heliport (IATA: QJI, ICAO: BGIT) is a heliport in Ikamiut, a village in the Qeqertalik municipality in western Greenland. The heliport is considered a helistop, and is served by Air Greenland as part of a government contract.

== Airlines and destinations ==
Airlines	Destinations
Air Greenland (settlement flights)	Seasonal: Akunnaaq, Qasigiannguit
