= Qasigiannguit Heliport =

Heliport in Greenland

- IATA: JCH; ICAO: BGCH

Summary
- Airport type: Public
- Operator: Greenland Airport Authority (Mittarfeqarfiit)
- Serves: Qasigiannguit, Greenland
- Elevation AMSL: 70 ft / 21 m
- Coordinates: 68°49′02″N 051°10′29″W
- Website: Qasigiannguit Heliport

Map
- Location in Greenland

Helipads
Number	Length		Surface
Number	m	ft	Surface
1	20 × 20	66 × 66	Concrete
- Source: Danish AIS

Qasigiannguit Heliport (IATA: JCH, ICAO: BGCH) is a heliport in the eastern part of Qasigiannguit, a town located on the southeastern shores of Disko Bay in Qeqertalik municipality, in western Greenland.

== Airlines and destinations ==
Airlines	Destinations
Air Greenland	Seasonal: Aasiaat Ilulissat, Qeqertarsuaq
Air Greenland (settlement flights)	Seasonal: Ikamiut, Ilimanaq
