= Attu Heliport =

Heliport in Greenland

- IATA: QGQ; ICAO: BGAT

Summary
- Airport type: Public
- Operator: Greenland Airport Authority (Mittarfeqarfiit)
- Serves: Attu, Greenland
- Elevation AMSL: 32 ft / 10 m
- Coordinates: 67°56′35″N 053°37′20″W
- Website: Attu Heliport

Map
- Location in Greenland

Helipads
Number	Length		Surface
Number	m	ft	Surface
1	30 × 20	98 × 66	Grass
- Source: Danish AIS

Attu Heliport (IATA: QGQ, ICAO: BGAT) is a heliport in Attu, a village in the southernmost part of Qeqertalik municipality in western Greenland, on the shore of Davis Strait. The heliport is considered a helistop, and is served by Air Greenland as part of government contract.

== Airlines and destinations ==
Airlines	Destinations
Air Greenland (settlement flights)	Seasonal: Aasiaat, Kangaatsiaq
