= Disko Line =

Ferry line in western Greenland

Disko Line A/S
- Type: Aktieselskab
- Industry: Transport
- Founded: 2004
- Headquarters: Ilulissat, Greenland
- Area served: Disko Bay, Greenland
- Key people: Ole Dorph
- Products: Coastal trade and passenger ferry
- Parent: Topas Travel (partial)
- Website: diskoline.gl

Disko Line A/S is a passenger, freight and tourism ferry line in western Greenland. It was founded in 2004 as a small freight company. Disko Line is Part of Topas Explorer Group

== Complementary transport services ==
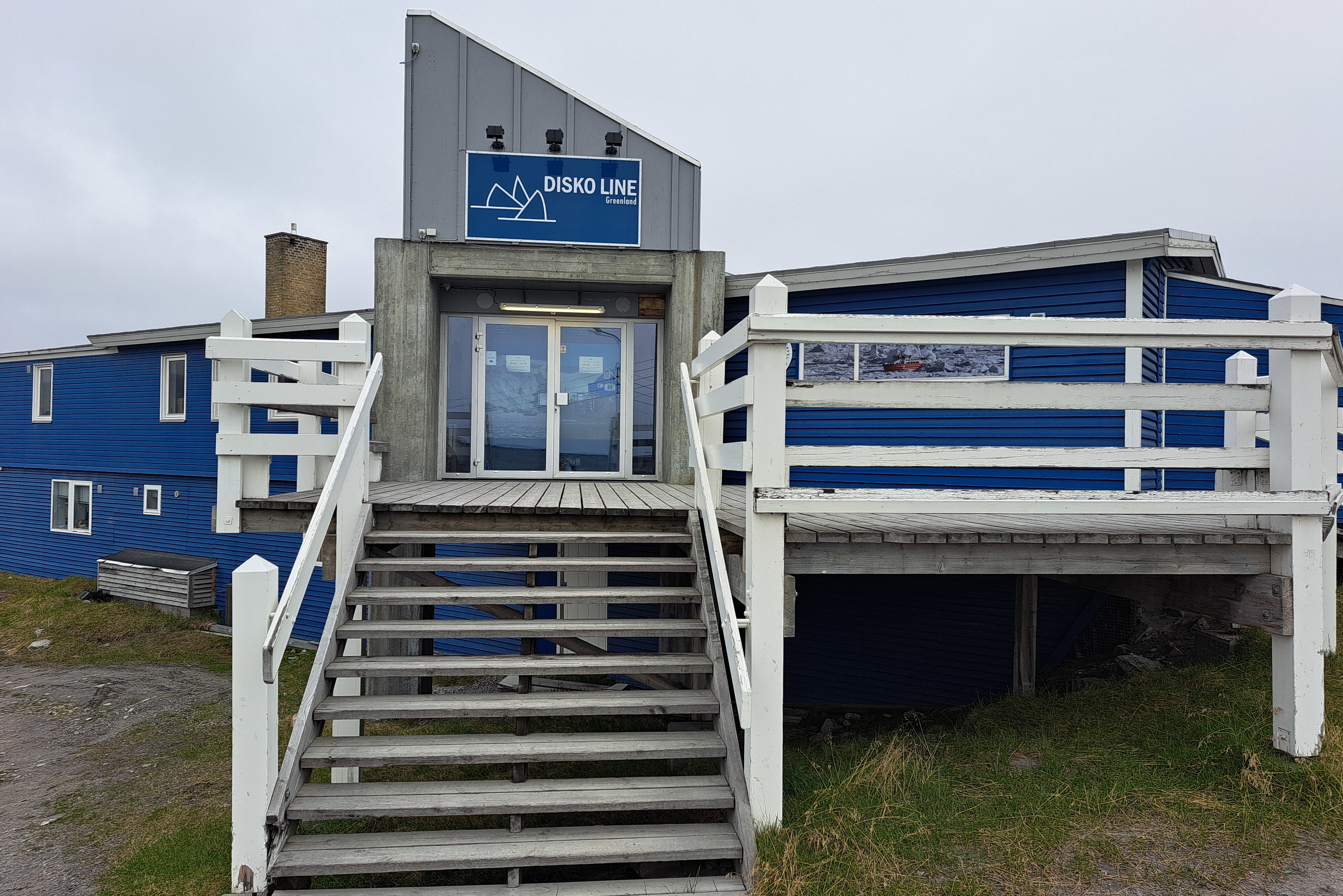
Disko Line headquarters in Ilulissat

Disko Line provides sea transport services on contract with the Government of Greenland, serving towns and settlements of the Disko Bay region in western Greenland, from Aasiaat Archipelago in the south, through Disko Island and southern Nuussuaq Peninsula in the north, to the eastern coast of Disko Bay in the east. The routes are operated during spring, summer, and fall, when the bay is navigable, complementing the air connections operated by Air Greenland during winter, also on governmental contract. The line also provides various tourist charter services in the region.

== Disko Line fleet ==
As of 2022, Disko Line operates 16 ships able to carry between 10 and 60 passengers. Routes served:

| Image | Vessel | Capacity | Routes |
|---|---|---|---|
| | Najaaraq Ittuk | 60 | Ilulissat − Aasiaat − Qeqertarsuaq |
| | Najaaraq Ittuk | 60 | Ilulissat − Qeqertarsuaq |
| | Najaaraq Ittuk | 60 | Ilulissat − Qeqertarsuaq − Aasiaat |
| | Najaaraq Ittuk | 60 | Ilulissat − Qasigiannguit − Aasiaat − Qeqertarsuaq |
| | Najaaraq Ittuk | 60 | Ilulissat − Uummannaq |
| | Aleqa Ittuk | 36 | Ilulissat − Ilimanaq |
| | Aleqa Ittuk | 36 | Ilulissat − Oqaatsut − Qeqertaq − Saqqaq |
| | Aviaq Ittuk | 36 | Aasiaat − Kangaatsiaq − Attu − Iginniarfik − Ikerasaarsuk − Niaqornaarsuk |
| | Aviaq Ittuk | 36 | Aasiaat − Akunnaaq − Ikamiut − Qasigiannguit |
| | Aviaq Ittuk | 36 | Aasiaat − Kitsissuarsuit − Qeqertarsuaq |
| | Aviaq Ittuk | 36 | Aasiaat − Kangaatsiaq |
| | Aviaq Ittuk | 36 | Aasiaat − Ikamiut − Qasigiannguit − Ilulissat |
| | Sapangaq | 36 | |
| | Nanoq | 12 | |
| | Ulu | 10 | |
| | Ukaleq | 12 | |
| | Amaroq | 12 | |
| | Aarluk | 12 | |
| | Sulisoq | 12 | |
| | Arfivik | 12 | |
| | Niisa | 12 | |
| | Mikisoq | 5 | |
| | Ice Force V | 12 | |
| | Nilak | 12 | |
| | Iluliaq | 12 | |

== Connections to regions in northwestern Greenland ==
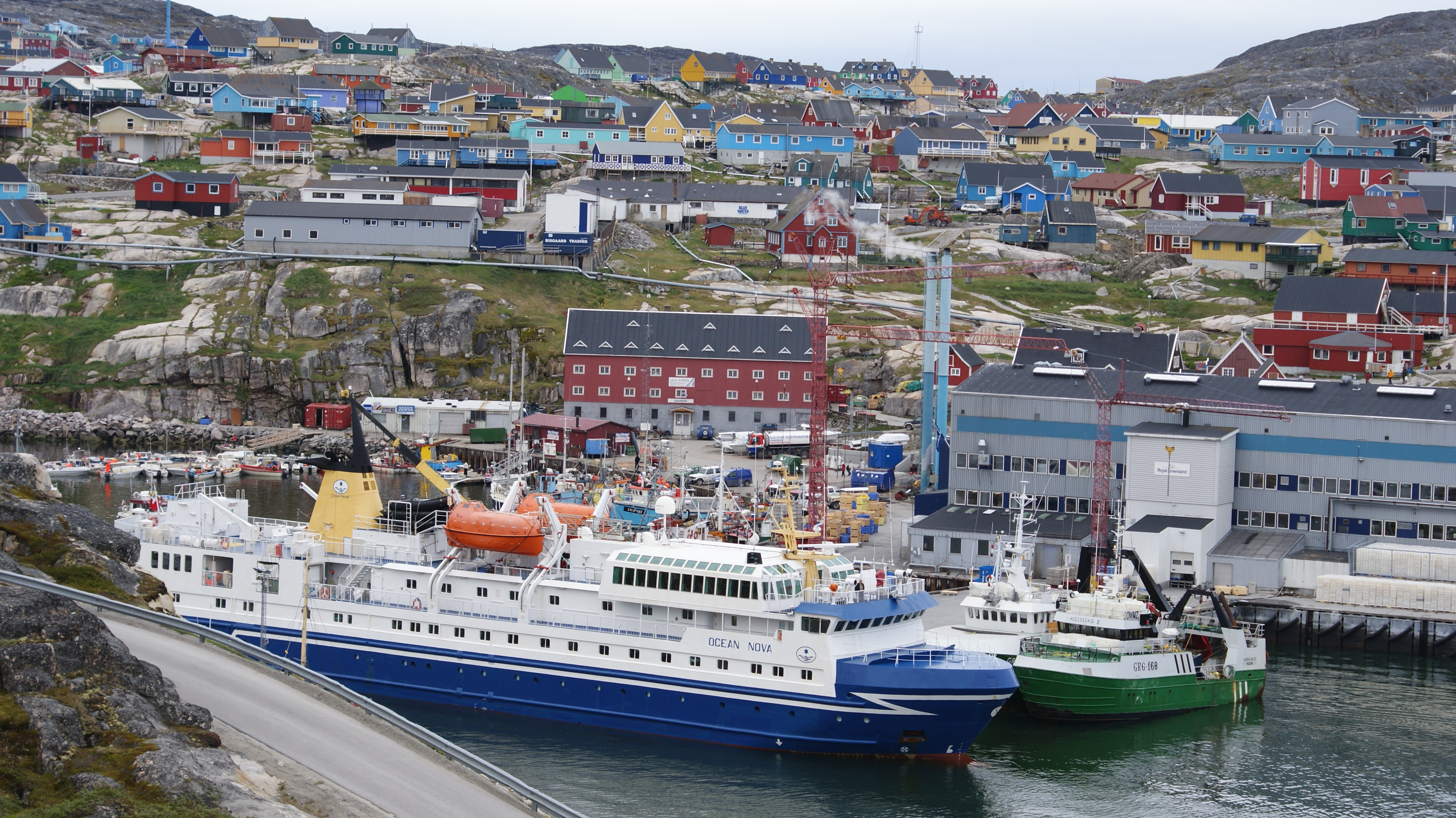
The port in Ilulissat is one of two home ports for Disko Line, alongside Aasiaat port.

Disko Line is the only passenger line linking Disko Bay with Uummannaq in the Uummannaq Fjord region after the Arctic Umiaq Line sold M/S Sarpik Ittuk, one of its two large passenger ships, in 2006−leaving the regions without a maritime connection.

Extension of the service from Uummannaq to Upernavik was studied in 2007, however in light of the DKK 13 mln subsidy from the government required to make the route operating at a break-even level, the subsidy was refused, and the plans were scrapped.

As of 2010 transport services between Upernavik Archipelago and the Uummannaq Fjord region are provided by infrequent cargo/ferry ships of Royal Arctic Line, and by Air Greenland via Upernavik Airport, Uummannaq Heliport, and the transfer point at Qaarsut Airport.
