= Akunnaaq Heliport =

Heliport in Greenland

- IATA: QCU; ICAO: BGAK

Summary
- Airport type: Public
- Operator: Greenland Airport Authority (Mittarfeqarfiit)
- Serves: Akunnaaq, Greenland
- Elevation AMSL: 59 ft / 18 m
- Coordinates: 68°44′39″N 052°20′25″W
- Website: Akunnaaq Heliport

Map
- Location in Greenland

Helipads
Number	Length		Surface
Number	m	ft	Surface
1	15	49	Gravel
- Source: Danish AIS

Akunnaaq Heliport (IATA: QCU, ICAO: BGAK) is a heliport in Akunnaaq, a village in Qeqertalik municipality in western Greenland. The heliport is considered a helistop, and is served by Air Greenland as part of government contract.

== Airlines and destinations ==
Airlines	Destinations
Air Greenland (settlement flights)	Seasonal: Aasiaat, Ikamiut
