= Kitsissuarsuit Heliport =

Heliport in Greenland

- IATA: QJE; ICAO: BGKT

Summary
- Airport type: Public
- Operator: Greenland Airport Authority (Mittarfeqarfiit)
- Serves: Kitsissuarsuit, Greenland
- Elevation AMSL: 18 ft / 5 m
- Coordinates: 68°51′29″N 053°07′26″W
- Website: Kitsissuarsuit Heliport

Map
- Location in Greenland

Helipads
Number	Length		Surface
Number	m	ft	Surface
1	15	49	Gravel
- Source: Danish AIS

Kitsissuarsuit Heliport (IATA: QJE, ICAO: BGKT) is a heliport in Kitsissuarsuit, a Disko Bay island village in Qeqertalik municipality in western Greenland. The heliport is considered a helistop, and is served by Air Greenland as part of a government contract.

== Airlines and destinations ==
Airlines	Destinations
Air Greenland (settlement flights)	Seasonal: Aasiaat
