= Attu =

Attu may refer to:

- Attu Island, Alaska, the westernmost island of the Aleutian Islands chain
  - Battle of Attu, a 1943 World War II land battle on Attu Island
  - Attu Station, Alaska, a LORAN station on Attu Island
- Attu, Greenland, a settlement
- Attu (film), a 2017 Indian gangster film
- An extinct dialect of the Aleut language
- A breakfast dish in Andhra Pradesh, India - see List of Indian dishes
