= Niaqornaarsuk Heliport =

Heliport in Greenland

- IATA: QMK; ICAO: BGNK

Summary
- Airport type: Public
- Operator: Greenland Airport Authority (Mittarfeqarfiit)
- Serves: Niaqornaarsuk, Greenland
- Elevation AMSL: 152 ft / 46 m
- Coordinates: 68°14′21″N 052°50′35″W
- Website: Niaqornaarsuk Heliport

Map
- Location in Greenland

Helipads
Number	Length		Surface
Number	m	ft	Surface
1	5	16	Grass
- Source: Danish AIS

Niaqornaarsuk Heliport (IATA: QMK, ICAO: BGNK) is a heliport in Niaqornaarsuk, a village in Avannaata municipality in western Greenland. The heliport is considered a helistop, and is served by Air Greenland as part of a government contract.

== Airlines and destinations ==
Airlines	Destinations
Air Greenland (settlement flights)	Seasonal: Aasiaat, Kangaatsiaq
