= Mâliâraq Vebæk =

- Born: Marie Athalie Qituraq Kleist; 20 April 1917; Narsarmijit, Greenland
- Died: 25 February 2012 (aged 94); Søborg, Denmark
- Other names: Mâliâraq Kleist
- Citizenship: Greenlandic
- Occupations: teacher, writer
- Years active: 1939–1997

Mâliâraq Vebæk (20 April 1917 – 25 February 2012) was a Greenlandic teacher and writer. She is known as the first woman of Greenland to publish a novel. One of the first women to obtain a higher education in Greenland, she began her career as a teacher. After six years, she relocated to Denmark and worked on archaeological excavations and ethnographic surveys with her husband from 1946 to 1962. She began publishing stories, legends and folktales in the 1950s, both through print media and on radio. In 1981, after having participated in a survey on the intercultural issues for Greenlanders and Danes, published a novel inspired by the research. It won the Greenlandic Authors Association Award for 1982.

== Early life ==
Marie Athalie Qituraq Kleist, known as Mâliâraq, was born on 20 April 1917 in Narsarmijit, Greenland to Bolette Marie Ingeborg (née Chemnitz) and Hans Hoseas Josva Kleist. There were eight children in her family and her father was a local priest who wrote popular hymns and served on the South Greenland County Council. Though school was stressed at home, their mother made sure that her daughters learned the traditional skills, like leather tanning and skinning, which were required of Greenlandic women at that time. When she was ten years old, she moved to Alluitsoq (formerly known as Lichtenau) to live with her grandparents, taking some of the financial strain off of her parents. Her grandfather, Jens Chemnitz, had been educated in Denmark and was one of the first priests to come to Greenland and was also known to have been one of the first Greenlanders to engage in raising sheep.

In 1932, for the first time secondary schooling was offered for girls when a boarding school opened in Aasiaat (formerly known as Egedesminde). Kleist had to go to Qaqortoq to take a test, but upon passing the examination was admitted to study at Aasiaat. The program was a two-year curricula and for girls included in addition to academic studies, domestic science, childcare and practical skills they would need as wives. She finished her studies as valedictorian of her class, surpassing all the boys in their parallel courses. Because of her marks, the Committee for Greenlandic Education, a private organization which promoted further studies in Denmark to enable girls to learn various trades, offered Kleist a scholarship to continue her education. In September 1934, she arrived in Holte, where she lived with the pastor, Thorvald Povlsen, a family relative, for a year to improve her Danish. She enrolled in the Theodora Lang Seminars (da) in Silkeborg and attended through 1939. Though initially she had some trouble linguistically as the only Greenlandic speaker, she graduated, after passing her examination as a teacher.

== Career ==
Returning to Greenland in 1939, Kleist began working as a teacher in Ilulissat. In the summer of 1939 she met Christen Leif Pagh Vebæk, an archaeologist and museum inspector for the National Museum of Denmark's prehistoric department. Because of the war she remained in Greenland, teaching in Aasiaat and later Paamiut, while Vebæk returned to Denmark and was unable to reunite with her until the conflict ended. On 4 August 1945, the couple were married in Qaqortoq and almost immediately moved to Denmark, where their daughters, Bolette (1946) and Astrid (1947) were born. In the early years of their marriage, while raising their children, Vebæk accompanied her husband on numerous archaeological expeditions to Greenland, including his explorations in 1946, 1948 to 1951, 1954, 1958 and 1962. She served as his interpreter and prepared ethnological surveys in Greenlandic to assist in the collection of information about the culture. Once the surveys were completed, she translated them for Danish analyzers.

During these archaeological and ethnological expeditions, Vebæk began collecting songs, legends and folktales, which from the mid-1950s, she published in journals and newspapers in both Denmark and Greenland. She illustrated her articles with silhouettes of her own design. From 1958, she worked as a freelancer for the Greenlandic department of Copenhagen, which later shared the recordings with the radio station in Kuuk. She began reading traditional stories, but by 1959 was producing her own soundtracks, which would be recorded with other Greenlanders living in Denmark playing the various roles. There had been an influx of Greenlanders moving to Denmark in the decade from 1950 to 1960. At the beginning of 1970, she was asked to participate in a comprehensive study of the relationship of the two countries. She helped with the interviews and translated the work into Greenlandic. The result was published in Danish as Grønlændere i Danmark (Greenlanders in Denmark) in 1971–72 and two years later in Greenlandic as Kalâtdlit Danmarkime.

During the survey, Vebæk became aware of the problems that interculturalism posed for women, specifically Greenlandic women who had married Danish men. These insights influenced her later writings focused on women, such as the suppression that their gender caused and conflicts between Danish and Greenlandic culture. In 1981, she published the first novel written by a Greenlandic woman, Búsime nâpínek (Meeting on the Bus), the tragedy of a chance meeting which turned into a friendship and tells the story of repression which leads to the main character Katrine's demise. Vebæk received the Greenlandic Authors Association award in 1982 and that same year, she translated the story into Danish, which was published as Historien om Katrine. The book gained a wide readership and was reprinted in 1993 and 1994, being subsequently translated into Russian and Sami. In 1992, Vebæk picked up the story of what happened to Katrine's daughter in Ukiut trettenit qaangiummata (Then, Thirteen Years Later). In 1990, she published a history of Greenlandic women using much of her ethnographic material collected earlier. The Danish title Navaranaaq og de andre was released as Navaranaaq Allallu in Greenlandic in 1996 and retold women's story from legendary times to the present. The previous year, she published a children's story, Sassuma Arnaanut pulaarneq, translated into Danish in 1995 and into English in 1998 under the title A Journey to the Mother of the Sea.

== Death and legacy ==
Vebæk died on 25 February 2012 in Søborg and her funeral was held on 2 March 2012 at Gladsaxe Church. She is remembered not only for her own writings, but for her contributions to collect and preserve the folklore of Greenland.
