= Attu, Greenland =

Settlement in Greenland

Attu
- Location within Greenland
- Coordinates: 67°56′26″N 53°37′22″W
- State: Kingdom of Denmark
- Constituent country: Greenland
- Municipality: Qeqertalik

Population (2020)
  - Total: 203
- Time zone: UTC−02:00 (Western Greenland Time)
  - Summer (DST): UTC−01:00 (Western Greenland Summer Time)
- Postal code: 3955 Kangaatsiaq

Attu is a settlement in the Qeqertalik municipality in western Greenland, located on a small island on the shores of Davis Strait. Its population was 203 in 2020. It is the southernmost settlement in the municipality.

== Transport ==
Air Greenland serves the village as part of government contract, with winter-only helicopter flights from Attu Heliport to Aasiaat Airport and Kangaatsiaq Heliport. Settlement flights in the Disko Bay are unique in that they are operated only during winter and spring.

During summer and autumn, when the waters of Disko Bay are navigable, communication between settlements is by sea only, serviced by Diskoline. The ferry links Attu with Kangaatsiaq, and further with Iginniarfik, Ikerasaarsuk, Niaqornaarsuk, and Aasiaat.

=== Climate ===
Attu experiences a tundra climate (Köppen: ET); with short, cool summers and long, frigid winters. The settlement is frequently subject to rough weather accompanying lows passing through the Davis Strait; characterised by strong northerly or southerly winds that often reach gale force strength. Moreover, due to its insular position on Kitsissut Island, Attu experiences high relative humidity, vast seasonal lag and low diurnal temperature variation year-round.

Climate data for Attu (67.78°N 53.97°W) (10 m (33 ft) AMSL) (1991-2020 data)
Month	Jan	Feb	Mar	Apr	May	Jun	Jul	Aug	Sep	Oct	Nov	Dec	Year
Record high °C (°F)	6.3 (43.3)	7.2 (45.0)	6.1 (43.0)	9.2 (48.6)	8.9 (48.0)	15.2 (59.4)	14.9 (58.8)	14.0 (57.2)	11.7 (53.1)	11.5 (52.7)	8.5 (47.3)	7.8 (46.0)	15.2 (59.4)
Mean daily maximum °C (°F)	−9.1 (15.6)	−11.3 (11.7)	−11.0 (12.2)	−5.4 (22.3)	−0.2 (31.6)	3.0 (37.4)	5.6 (42.1)	6.2 (43.2)	4.3 (39.7)	1.0 (33.8)	−2.4 (27.7)	−5.5 (22.1)	−2.1 (28.2)
Daily mean °C (°F)	−11.1 (12.0)	−13.5 (7.7)	−12.9 (8.8)	−7.0 (19.4)	−1.4 (29.5)	1.8 (35.2)	4.3 (39.7)	5.0 (41.0)	3.3 (37.9)	−0.2 (31.6)	−3.8 (25.2)	−7.2 (19.0)	−3.6 (25.5)
Mean daily minimum °C (°F)	−13.0 (8.6)	−15.6 (3.9)	−14.9 (5.2)	−8.8 (16.2)	−2.7 (27.1)	0.6 (33.1)	3.0 (37.4)	3.9 (39.0)	2.3 (36.1)	−1.4 (29.5)	−5.1 (22.8)	−8.7 (16.3)	−5.0 (23.0)
Record low °C (°F)	−27.8 (−18.0)	−33.1 (−27.6)	−36.5 (−33.7)	−22.3 (−8.1)	−15.6 (3.9)	−3.4 (25.9)	−2.1 (28.2)	−1.1 (30.0)	−4.0 (24.8)	−8.9 (16.0)	−17.9 (−0.2)	−22.6 (−8.7)	−36.5 (−33.7)
Average relative humidity (%)	80.3	81.9	81.4	81.8	85.3	92.3	92.7	91.5	83.0	77.9	76.8	78.4	83.6
Source: Danish Meteorological Institute (1991-2020 data)

== Population ==
Attu has experienced a sharp decline in population over a long period of time. The settlement lost nearly 36% of its population relative to the 1990 levels, and more than a quarter relative to the 2000 levels, with the population still decreasing.

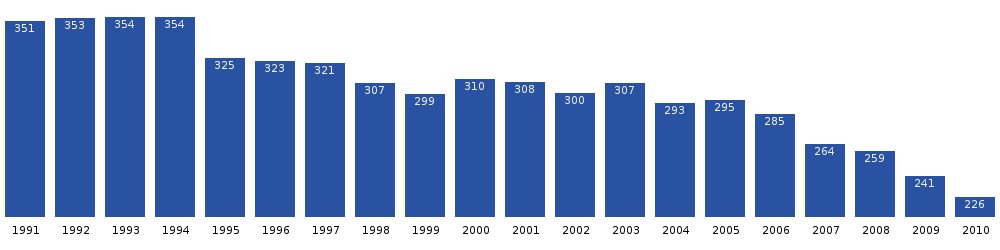
Attu population growth dynamics in the last 20 years. Source: Statistics Greenland
