= Kangaatsiaq =

Place in Greenland, Kingdom of Denmark

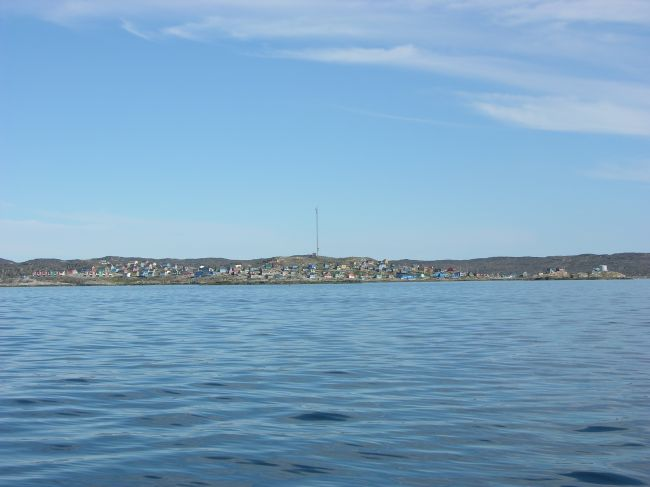
- Kangaatsiaq

- Location within Greenland
- Coordinates: 68°18′25″N 53°27′49″W
- State: Kingdom of Denmark
- Constituent country: Greenland
- Municipality: Qeqertalik

Population (2025)
  - Total: 471
- Time zone: UTC−02:00 (Western Greenland Time)
  - Summer (DST): UTC−01:00 (Western Greenland Summer Time)
- Postal code: 3955

Kangaatsiaq (Greenlandic pronunciation: [kaŋaːtsiɑq], old spelling: Kangâtsiaq) is a town located in the Qeqertalik municipality in western Greenland. The town received town status as recently as 1986, though as a settlement it has existed much longer. It has 507 inhabitants as of 2023. Nearby settlements are Attu, Niaqornaarsuk, Ikerasaarsuk and Iginniarfik.

== Economy ==
Fishing and seal hunting are the main sources of income for the residents. Kangaatsiaq has a fish factory producing dried fish and shrimp.

== Facilities ==
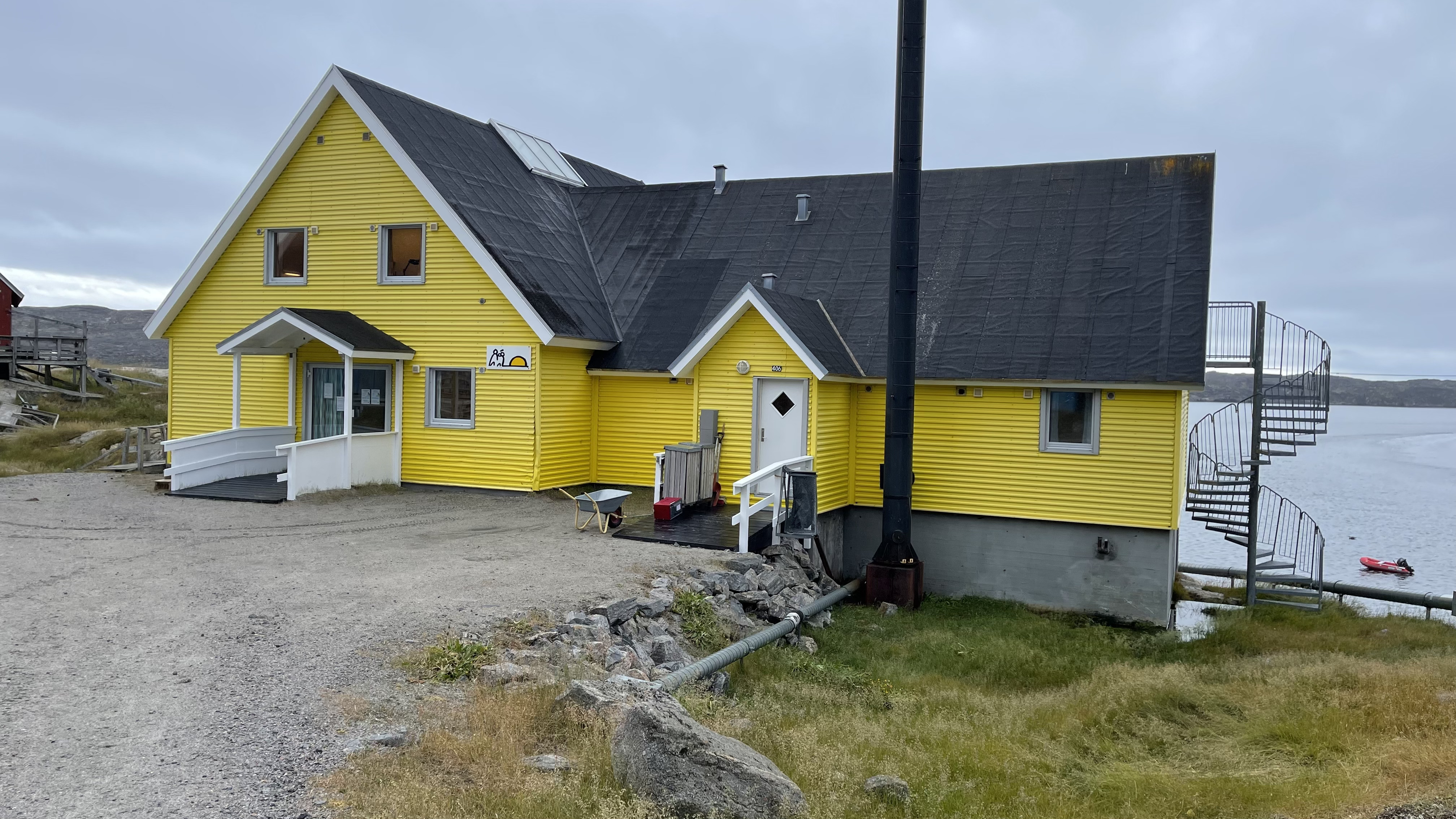
Kangaatsiaq Health Center

The town of Kangaatsiaq has a supermarket, kindergarten with 26 children, and a primary school (1st to 10th grade) with 150 pupils. A brand new school was inaugurated in August 2022. A hostel called 'The Lodge' with space for six people is the only accommodation for tourists.

== Transport ==
Air Greenland serves the village as part of government contract, with winter-only helicopter flights from Kangaatsiaq Heliport to Aasiaat Airport and several villages in the Aasiaat Archipelago. Settlement flights in the archipelago are unique in that they are operated only during winter and spring.

During summer and autumn, when the waters of Disko Bay are navigable, communication between settlements is by sea only, serviced by Diskoline. The ferry links Kangaatsiaq with Ikerasaarsuk, Attu, Iginniarfik, Niaqornaarsuk, and Aasiaat.

== Wildlife ==
The area has a rich Arctic wildlife including reindeer, Arctic fox, and Arctic hare. Marine mammals include ringed seal, harbor seal, hooded seal, bearded seal, harp seal, humpback whale (typically in summer), minke whale, fin whale, narwhal, and beluga. When the sea ice comes, sometimes walrus and polar bear can be seen.

Birdlife includes raven, ptarmigan, various species of seagull, eider, king eider, guillemot, falcon, eagle, snowy owl, snow bunting, Arctic tern, and more.

== Population ==
The population of Kangaatsiaq has fluctuated over the last two decades, decreasing over the last several years.

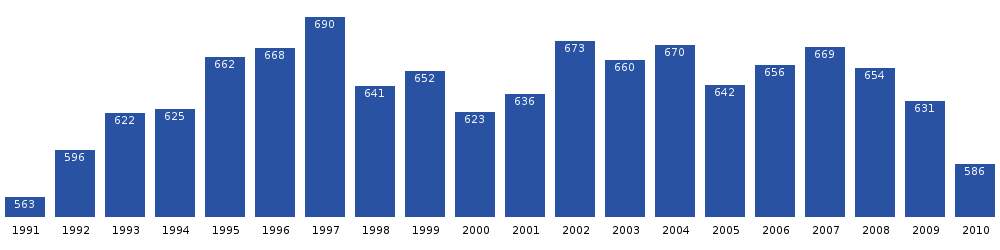
Kangaatsiaq population growth dynamics, 1991-2010. Source: Statistics Greenland
