= Iginniarfik Heliport =

Heliport in Greenland

- IATA: none; ICAO: BGIG

Summary
- Airport type: Public
- Operator: Greenland Airport Authority (Mittarfeqarfiit)
- Serves: Iginniarfik, Greenland
- Elevation AMSL: 50 ft / 15 m
- Coordinates: 68°08′45″N 053°10′10″W
- Website: Iginniarfik Heliport

Map
- Location in Greenland

Helipads
Number	Length		Surface
Number	m	ft	Surface
1	15	49	Gravel
- Source: Danish AIS

Iginniarfik Heliport (ICAO: BGIG) is a heliport in Iginniarfik, a village in the Qeqertalik municipality in western Greenland. The heliport is considered a helistop, and is served by Air Greenland as part of government contract.

== Airlines and destinations ==
Airlines	Destinations
Air Greenland (settlement flights)	Seasonal: Ikerasaarsuk, Kangaatsiaq
