= Kitsissuarsuit =

Kitsissuarsuit Hunde Ejlande
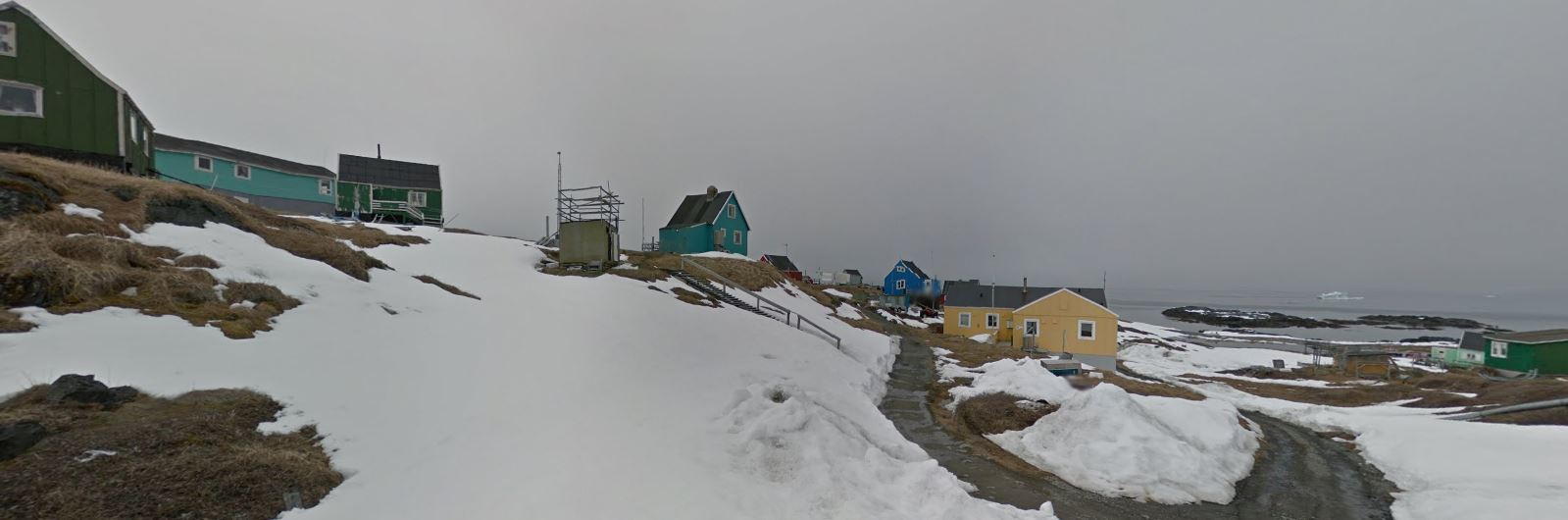
- Kitsissuarsuit

- Location within Greenland
- Coordinates: 68°51′25″N 53°07′15″W
- State: Kingdom of Denmark
- Constituent country: Greenland
- Municipality: Qeqertalik
- Founded: 1830

Population (2025)
  - Total: 55
- Time zone: UTC−02:00 (Western Greenland Time)
  - Summer (DST): UTC−01:00 (Western Greenland Summer Time)
- Postal code: 3950 Aasiaat

Kitsissuarsuit (old spelling: Kitsigsuarssuit) is a settlement in Qeqertalik municipality in western Greenland. The settlement was formerly founded in 1830 as Hunde Ejlande or Dog's Island, although it had already been used as a whaling station since 1817. Its population was 50 in 2020.

== Geography ==
Kitsissuarsuit is located on a small, 6 km^{2} (2.3 mi^{2}) island in southern Disko Bay, 21 km (13.0 mi) north of Aasiaat.

== Transport ==
=== Air ===
Air Greenland serves the village as part of government contract, with winter-only helicopter flights from Kitsissuarsuit Heliport to Aasiaat Airport. Settlement flights in the Disko Bay region are unique in that they are operated only during winter and spring.

=== Sea ===
During summer and autumn, when the waters of Disko Bay are navigable, communication between settlements is by sea only, serviced by Diskoline. The ferry links Kitsissuarsuit with Aasiaat and Qeqertarsuaq on Disko Island.

== Population ==
The population of Kitsissuarsuit has decreased by over 37 percent relative to the 1990 levels, and by over 28 percent relative to the 2000 levels.

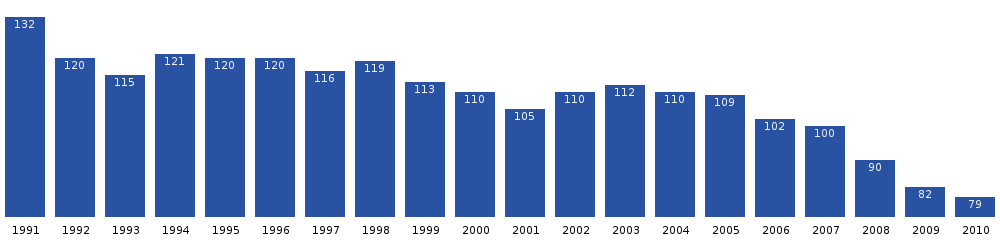
Kitsissuarsuit population growth dynamics in the last two decades. Source: Statistics Greenland
