= Akunnaaq =

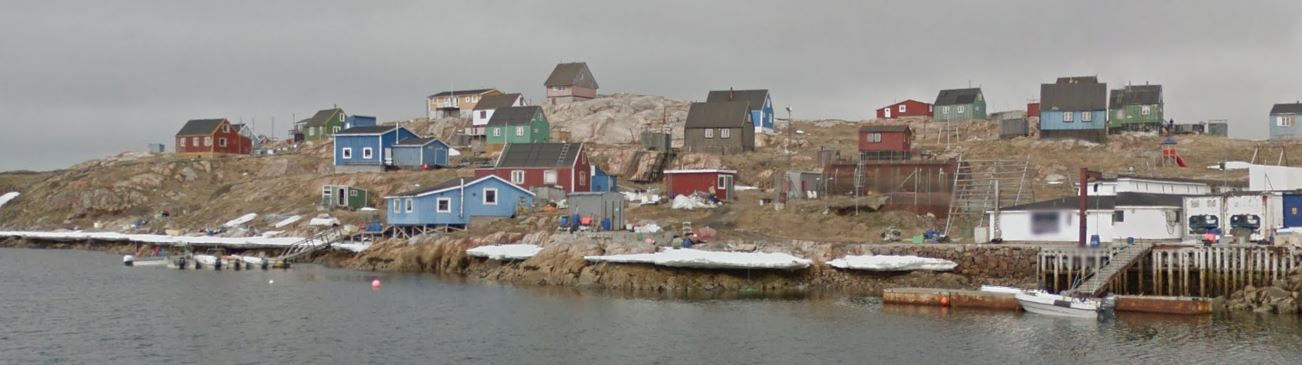
- Akunnaaq

- Location within Greenland
- Coordinates: 68°44′37″N 52°19′43″W
- State: Kingdom of Denmark
- Constituent country: Greenland
- Municipality: Qeqertalik
- Founded: 1850

Population (2025)
  - Total: 55
- Time zone: UTC−02:00 (Western Greenland Time)
  - Summer (DST): UTC−01:00 (Western Greenland Summer Time)
- Postal code: 3950 Aasiaat

Akunnaaq (old spelling: Akúnâk) is a settlement in the Qeqertalik municipality in western Greenland. Its population was 55 in 2025. Akunnaaq is located 23 km (14 mi) east of Aasiaat on the Akunnaap Nunnaa island. The settlement was founded in 1850.

== Transport ==
Air Greenland serves the village as part of government contract, with winter-only helicopter flights between Akunnaaq Heliport and Aasiaat Airport. Settlement flights in the Disko Bay are unique in that they are operated only during winter and spring.

During summer and autumn, when the waters of Disko Bay are navigable, communication between settlements is by sea only, serviced by Diskoline. The ferry links Akunnaaq with Aasiaat, Ikamiut, and Qasigiannguit.

== Population ==
The population of Akunnaaq has decreased by nearly 40 percent since the 1990 levels, levelling off in the 2000s.

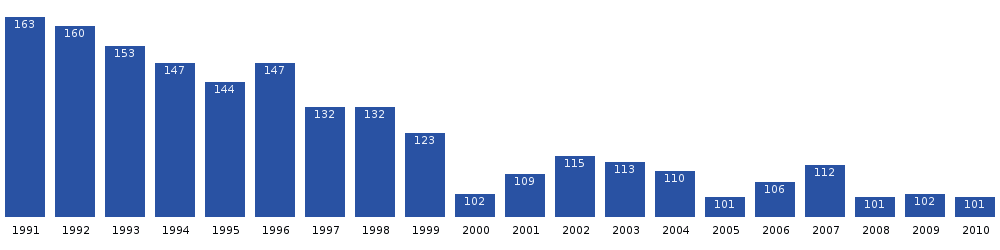
Akunnaaq population growth dynamics in the last two decades. Source: Statistics Greenland
