= Ikerasaarsuk Heliport =

Heliport in Greenland

- IATA: QRY; ICAO: BGIK

Summary
- Airport type: Public
- Operator: Greenland Airport Authority (Mittarfeqarfiit)
- Serves: Ikerasaarsuk, Greenland
- Elevation AMSL: 165 ft / 50 m
- Coordinates: 68°08′27″N 053°26′29″W
- Website: Ikerasaarsuk Heliport

Map
- Location in Greenland

Helipads
Number	Length		Surface
Number	m	ft	Surface
1	15	49	Gravel
- Source: Danish AIS

Ikerasaarsuk Heliport (IATA: QRY, ICAO: BGIK) is a heliport in Ikerasaarsuk, a village in Qeqertalik municipality in western Greenland. The heliport is considered a helistop, and is served by Air Greenland as part of a government contract.

== Airlines and destinations ==
Airlines	Destinations
Air Greenland (settlement flights)	Seasonal: Iginniarfik, Kangaatsiaq
