= Qasigiannguit =

Town in Greenland

Qasigiannguit Christianshåb
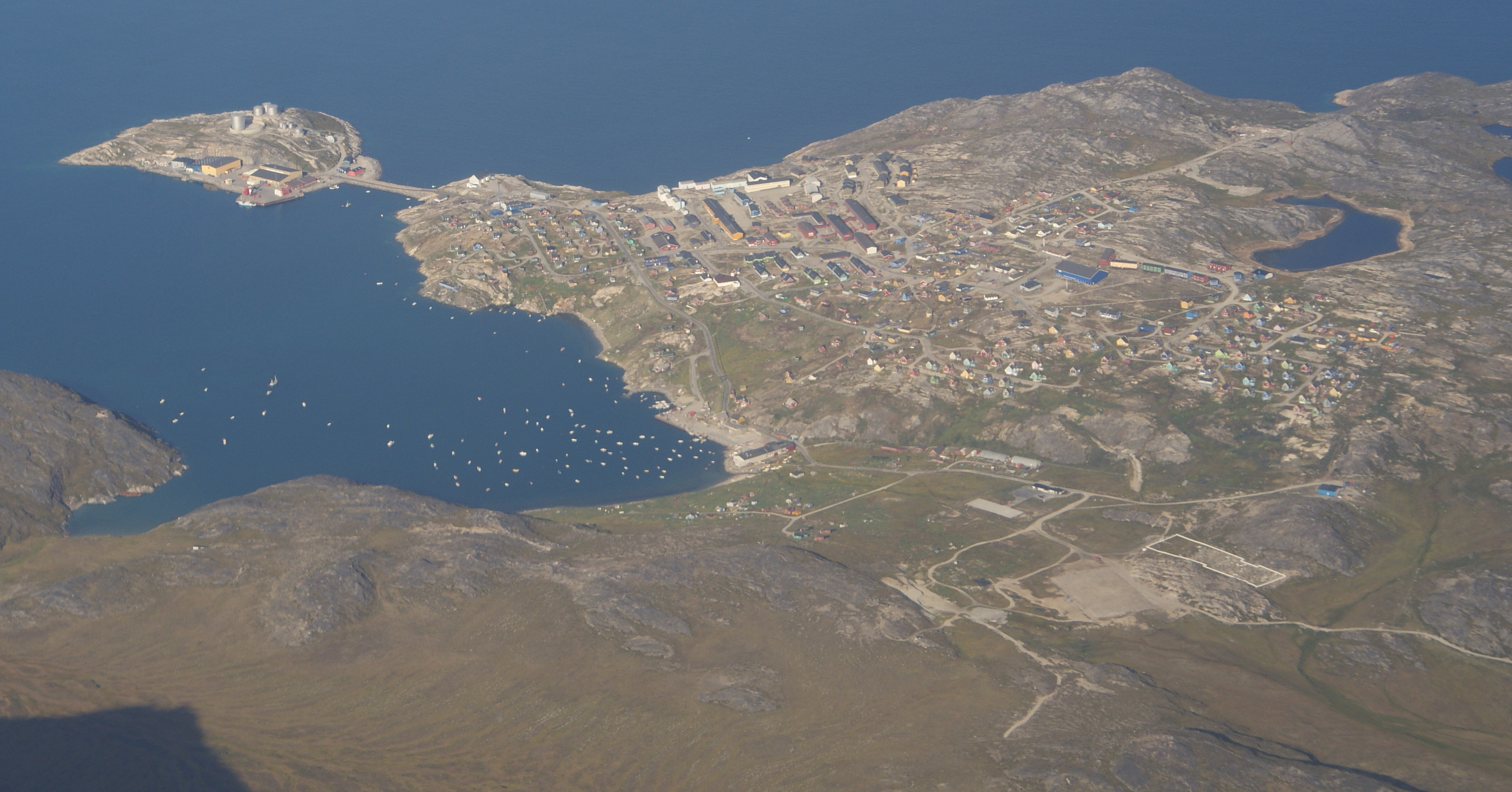
- Aerial view of Qasigiannguit

- Location within Greenland
- Coordinates: 68°49′12.52″N 51°11′35.67″W
- State: Kingdom of Denmark
- Constituent country: Greenland
- Municipality: Qeqertalik
- Founded: 1734

Population (2025)
  - Total: 952
- Time zone: UTC−02:00 (Western Greenland Time)
  - Summer (DST): UTC−01:00 (Western Greenland Summer Time)
- Postal code: 3951

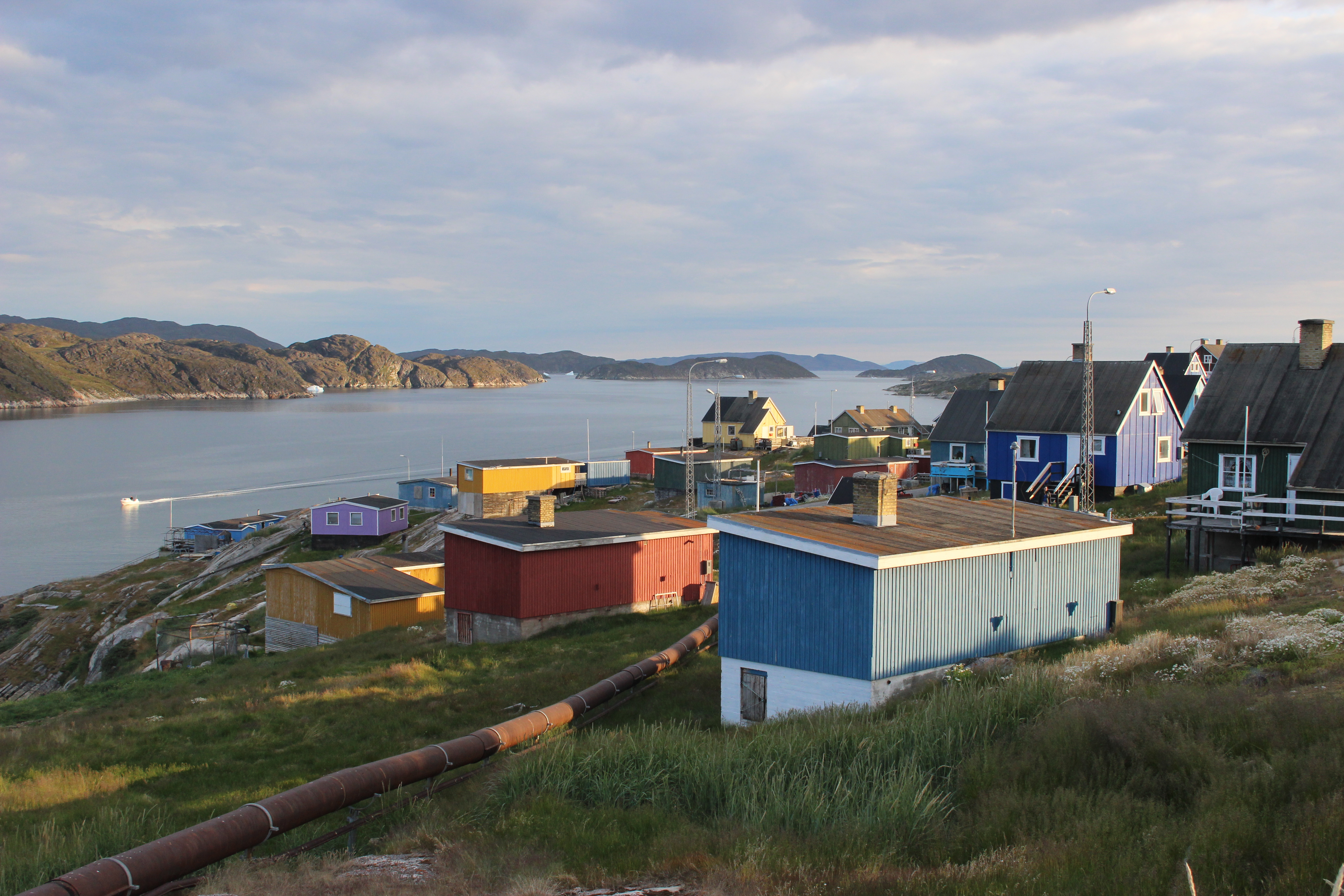
Qasigiannguit in July 2014

Qasigiannguit (Greenlandic pronunciation: [qaˌsiɣiˈaŋːuit]), also known as Christianshåb, is a town located in western Greenland on the southeastern shore of Disko Bay in the Qeqertalik municipality. With 1,081 inhabitants in 2020, it is the thirteenth-largest town in Greenland. The main industry is shrimp and halibut fishing.

== History ==
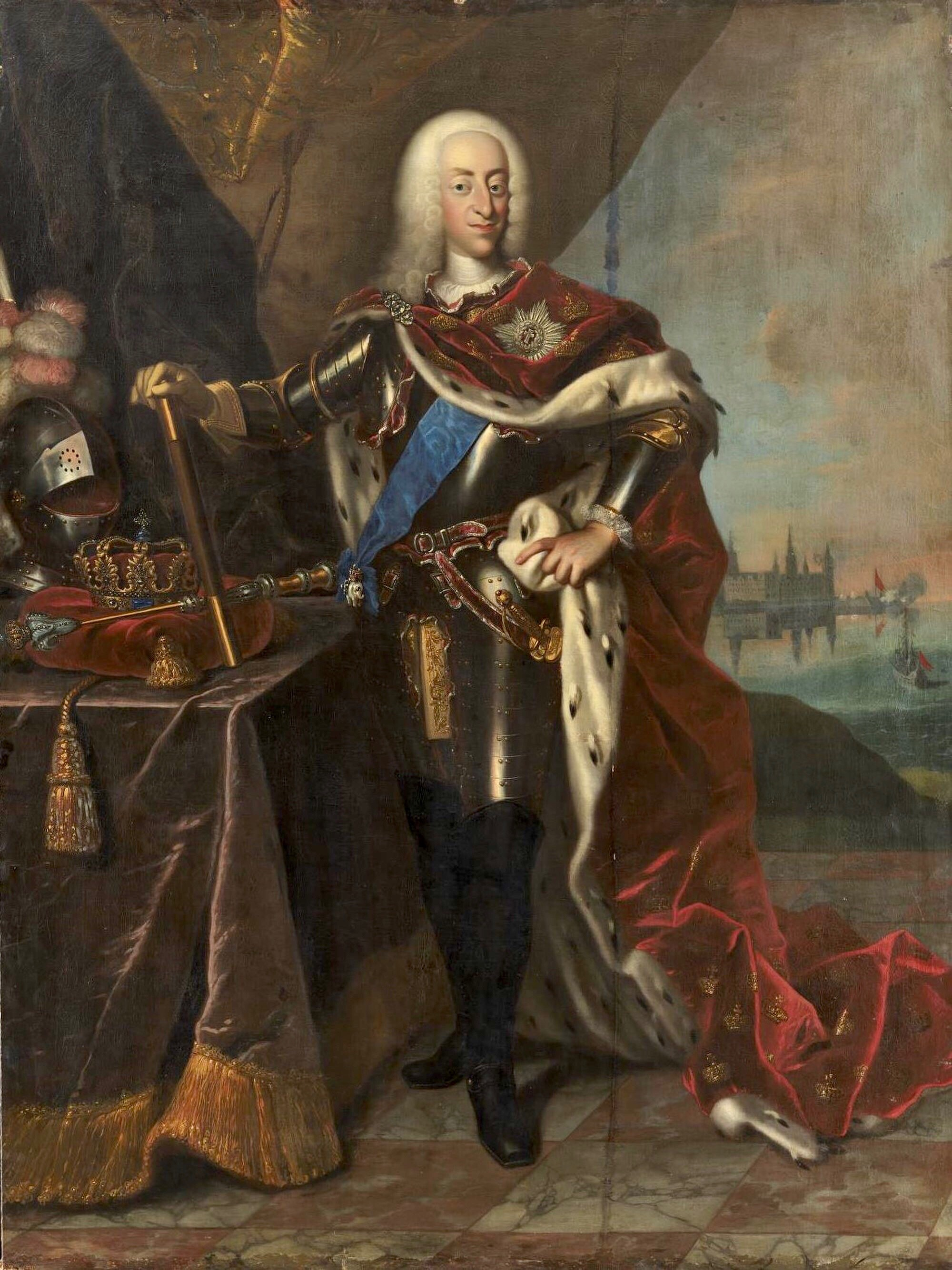
Portrait of Christian VI by Johann Salomon Wahl who had Christianshåb named in his honour

The settlement was founded as a trading post for Jacob Severin's company in 1734 and named Christianshaab in honour of King Christian VI of Denmark. The name was sometimes anglicized as Christian's Hope.

Paul Egede's former residence is Greenland's oldest surviving wooden building. It was completed on 25 July 1734 and moved to its present site in 1806 owing to the heavy wind at its original location across the bay. In 1997, a museum was officially opened in the Egede house. In the summer of 1999, an archaeological discovery provided the museum with a collection of finds from different prehistoric cultures.

== Transport ==
=== Air ===
During the winter, Air Greenland operates air services from the town heliport to Ilulissat, Qeqertarsuaq on Disko Island and Aasiaat.

=== Sea ===
During summer and autumn, when the waters of Disko Bay are navigable, communication between settlements is by sea only, serviced by Diskoline. The ferry links Qasigiannguit with Ilulissat, Aasiaat, Ikamiut, Akunnaaq, and Qeqertarsuaq.

== Population ==
With 1,081 inhabitants as of 2020, Qasigiannguit is the second-largest town in the Qeqertalik municipality. The town is steadily depopulating, with the population having decreased by more than 27% relative to the 1990 levels and by nearly 17% relative to the 2000 levels.

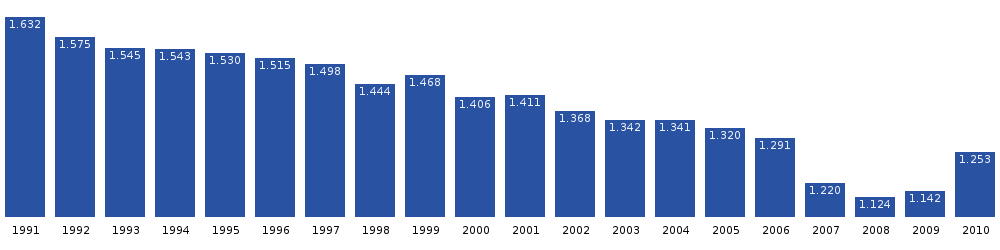
Qasigiannguit population growth dynamics, 1991-2010. (Source: Statistics Greenland)
