= Qamutiik =

Sled designed to travel on snow and ice

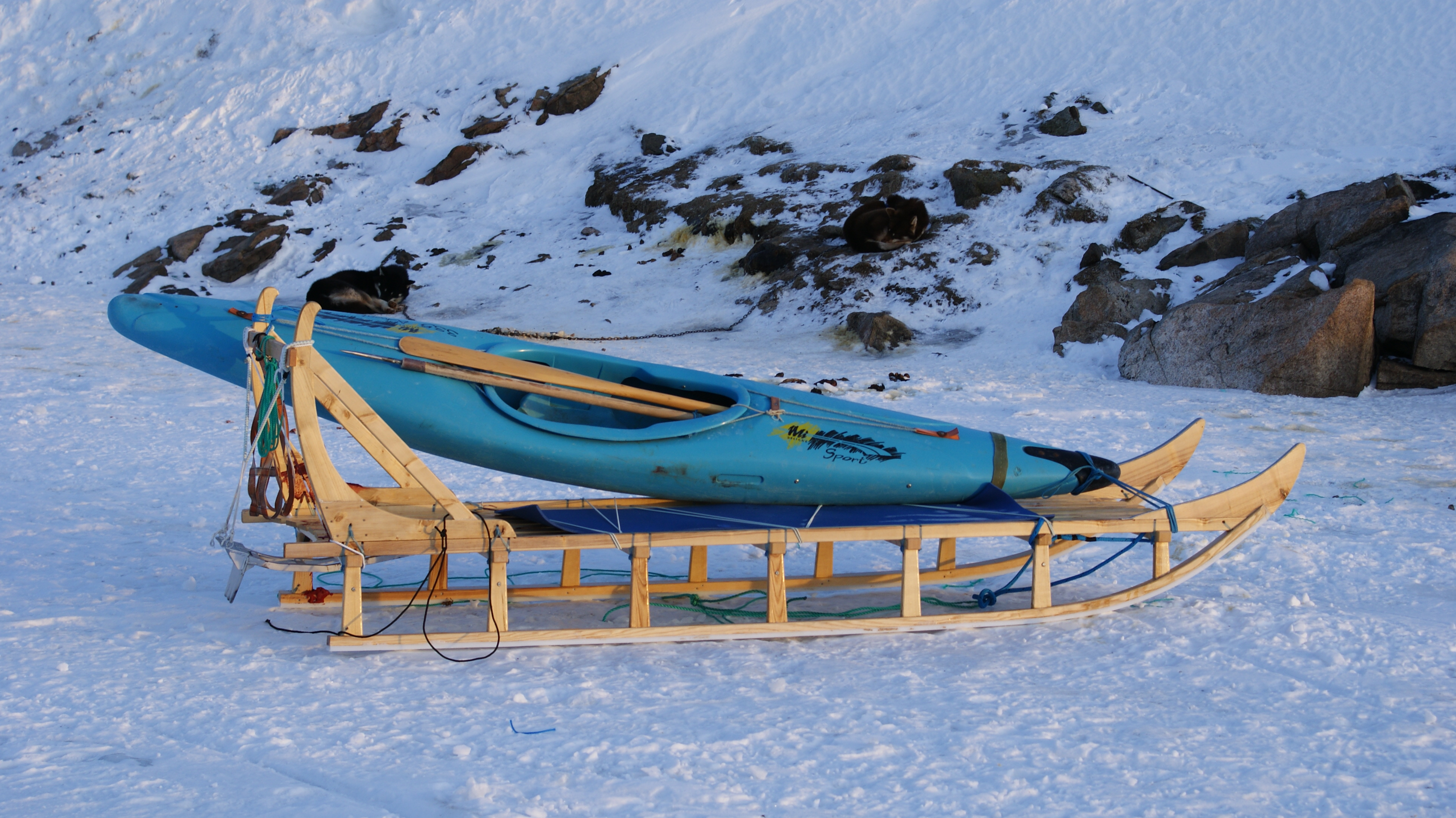
A qamutit carrying a kayak in Greenland, with dogs asleep in background

A qamutiik (Inuktitut: ᖃᒧᑏᒃ; alternate spellings qamutik (single sledge runner), komatik, Greenlandic: qamutit) is a traditional Inuit dog sled designed to travel on snow and ice. It is built using traditional Inuit design techniques and is still used in the 21st century for travel in Arctic regions.

The word "qamutiik" comes from the Inuit languages, which is spoken by Inuit in northern Canada, Alaska and Greenland. Qamutiiks are typically made of wood and are pulled by sled dogs, snowmobiles or other means of transportation. They are adapted to the Arctic sea ice environment and designed to be lightweight and sturdy with a low profile that makes them easier to maneuver over rough terrain. Qamutiiks are an important tool for transportation and hunting in Inuit communities.

== Design ==
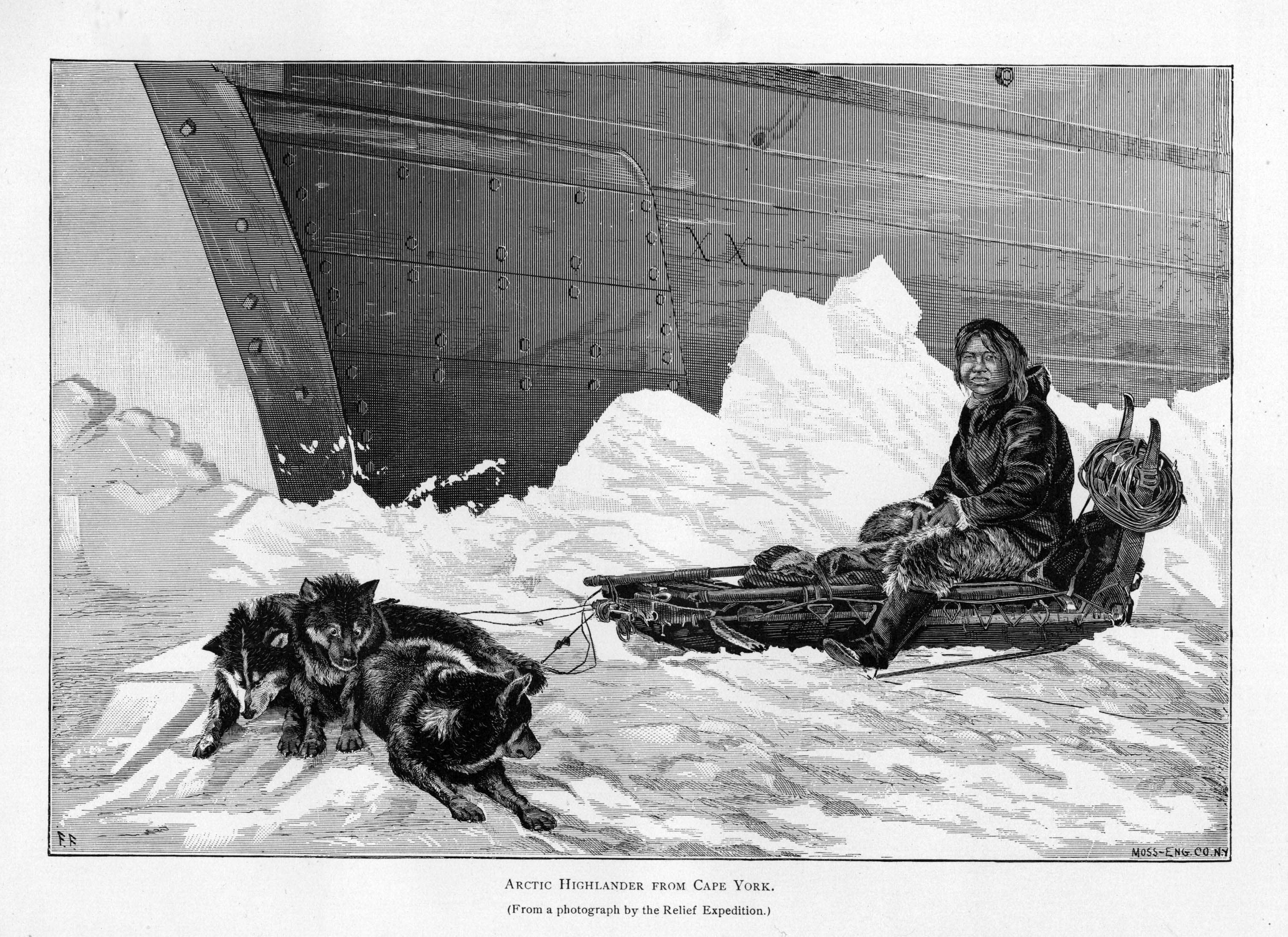
A qamutiik with napooks lashed directly to the runners

The key feature of the qamutiik is that it is not built with nails or pins to hold the runners and cross pieces in place. Each piece is drilled and lashed to the next, providing a flexibility of movement that can endure the pounding of travel on open sea ice, frozen land, ice floes, and across the heavy ice of tidal zones.

The cross pieces are called napooks. Each napook is notched near the ends to take a lashing which is passed through holes drilled through the runners. The first and last napooks are lashed individually to the runners, using a more secure knot using two holes in the runners. For the central napooks, there is a single hole in the runner for each napook and all of the central napooks are lashed in one continuous lashing along each side. The method of lashing forms a self-locking knot. In the early 21st century, the napooks are ideally made of hardwoods such as oak or walnut.

Archival materials and the stories of elders show that the people in areas without access to wood for runners used frozen fish wrapped in skins as runners. Moss and ice were used on the bottom of the runner to reduce drag. They are called pilraaq. In the 21st century wooden runners are universal, using usually either spruce or plywood, typically with a layer of polyurethane or nylon to reduce drag.

British and American diaries and accounts from the 1800 and early 1900s tell how their explorers, determined to use conventional sleds, found that the pounding of the sea-ice jolted the sleds so that nails were expelled, and the sled fell to pieces within several miles of their start point. They adopted Inuit-style sleds.

== Function ==
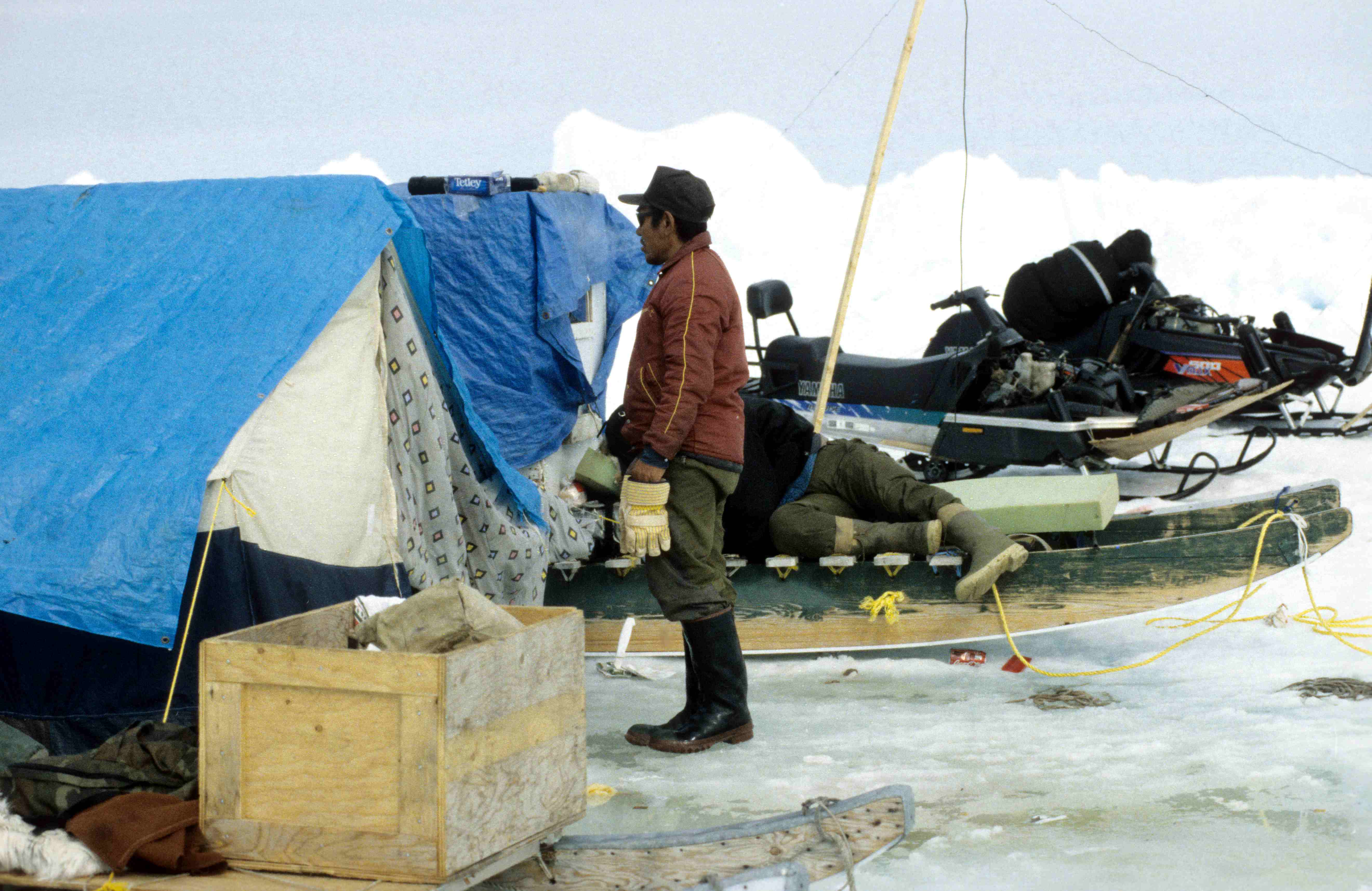
A hunter's camp at a floe edge, qamutiik with tarp-covered boxes. Snowmobiles in background.

Qamutiik are used for diverse travel in the Arctic, from afternoon outings for families going sledding to multi-day hunting trips covering hundreds of miles of terrain. Most qamutiik have space for fuel cans, a camp stove and grub box, positioned for easy access, and to permit quick stops for tea and food. Other gear and belongings are lashed to the sled body, and passengers can either ride atop this load holding on to the lashing ropes, or, in the more modern versions, ride in the comfort of a "box" lashed to the sled, sometimes with a small windbreak or canvas cover.

The packing and lashing of a sled is an art. Weight must be carried low on the sled, to reduce the risk of tipping. Ingenious structures and materials are used to protect the passengers and hunters build small sleek versions to permit fast day trips.

The qamutiik were traditionally hauled by trained dog teams. They can also be pulled by humans or, since the late 20th century, by a snowmobile. Sizes vary by function and the availability of materials.
