= Kangaatsiaq Heliport =

Heliport in Greenland

- IATA: none; ICAO: BGKA

Summary
- Airport type: Public
- Operator: Greenland Airport Authority (Mittarfeqarfiit)
- Serves: Kangaatsiaq, Greenland
- Elevation AMSL: 17 ft / 5 m
- Coordinates: 68°18′46″N 053°27′37″W
- Website: Kangaatsiaq Heliport

Map
- Location in Greenland

Helipads
| Number | Length | | Surface |
| Number | m | ft | Surface |
|---|---|---|---|
| 1 | 30 × 20 | 98 × 66 | Asphalt |
- Source: Danish AIS

Kangaatsiaq Heliport (ICAO: BGKA) is a heliport in Kangaatsiaq, a village in Qeqertalik municipality in western Greenland. The heliport is considered a helistop, and is served by Air Greenland as part of a government contract.

== Airlines and destinations ==
| Airlines | Destinations |
|---|---|
| Air Greenland (settlement flights) | Seasonal: Aasiaat, Attu, Iginniarfik, Ikerasaarsuk, Niaqornaarsuk |
