= Statistics Greenland =

Government statistics organization

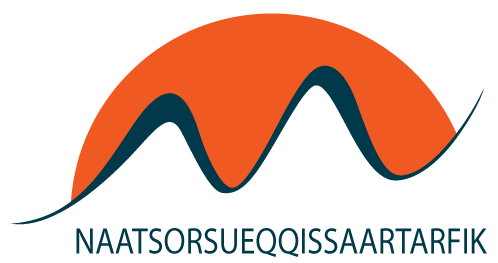

Statistics Greenland (Greenlandic: Kalaallit Nunaanni Naatsorsueqqissaartarfik, Danish: Grønlands Statistik) is a central statistical organization in Greenland, operating under the auspices of the Government of Greenland, working in cooperation with the Ministry for Finance. Based in Nuuk, the capital of Greenland, the organization was founded on 19 July 1989 by the Government of Greenland.

== History ==
Until 1989, Statistics Denmark maintained a dedicated department responsible for collecting data on Greenland. This arrangement changed on July 19, 1989, when Greenland passed its first statistics law. Later that same year, the organization was officially established, granting the territory independent responsibility for managing and compiling its own national statistics.

== Structure ==
Grønlands Statistik is managed by a chief statistician, who is nominated by the supervisory board and officially appointed by the government. The supervisory board itself comprises five members, each selected by the government to serve a three-year term.

== Publication ==
The publication of Greenlandic statistics began in 1905. Data regarding Greenland was regularly featured in the statistical yearbook of Danmarks Statistik. In 1968, the Ministry for Greenland (Grønlandsministeriet) also began incorporating statistical data into its annual reports. Starting in 1994, Grønlands Statistik launched its own official yearbook; it was printed until 2009, transitioned to a strictly digital format in 2010, and was ultimately discontinued after the 2017 edition. Since then, the organization has published an annual summary titled Grønland i tal ("Greenland in Figures"), available in Greenlandic, Danish, and English.

== See also ==
- List of national and international statistical services
