= Aasiaat Airport =

Airport in Aasiaat, Greenland

Aasiaat Airport Mittarfik Aasiaat
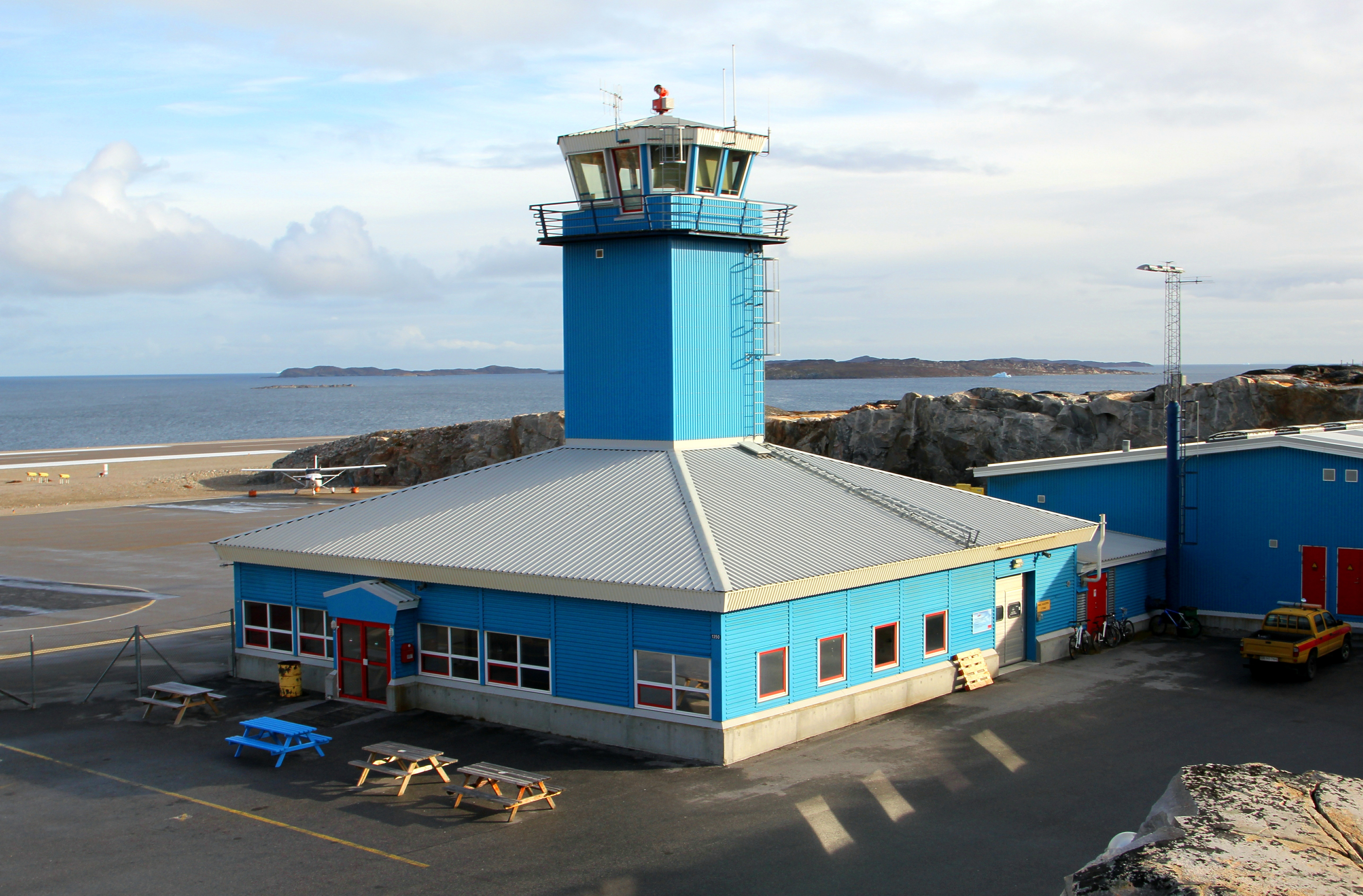
- IATA: JEG; ICAO: BGAA

Summary
- Airport type: Public
- Operator: Greenland Airport Authority (Mittarfeqarfiit)
- Serves: Aasiaat, Greenland
- Opened: 17 October 1998
- Elevation AMSL: 74 ft / 23 m
- Coordinates: 68°43′19″N 052°47′05″W
- Website: Aasiaat Airport

Map
- Location in Greenland

Runways
Direction	Length		Surface
Direction	m	ft	Surface
11/29	799	2,621	Asphalt

Statistics (2012)
- Passengers: 19,427
- Source: Danish AIS

Aasiaat Airport (Greenlandic: Mittarfik Aasiaat) (IATA: JEG, ICAO: BGAA) is an airport located in the Disko Bay, 1 NM (1.9 km; 1.2 mi) northeast of Aasiaat, a town in the Qeqertalik municipality in western Greenland. It can serve STOL aircraft, although there is no aircraft deicing equipment at the airport, which is costly and problematic in Greenlandic winter.

The airport was opened on 17 October 1998, replacing a heliport located in the town at 68.701468°N 52.874457°W.

== Airlines and destinations ==
Airlines	Destinations
Air Greenland	Ilulissat, Nuuk; Seasonal: Akunnaaq, Attu, Kangaatsiaq, Kitsissuarsuit, Niaqornaarsuk, Qasigiannguit, Qeqertarsuaq

== Ground transport ==
There is a road to Aasiaat, around 3 km (1.9 mi) road distance to the town centre. Taxis are available.
