= Aeronautical Information Service =

Service established in support of international civil aviation

The Aeronautical Information Service, or AIS (French: Service de l'Information Aéronautique, SIA) is a service established in support of international civil aviation, whose objective is to ensure the flow of information necessary for the safety, regularity, and efficiency of international air navigation.

The manner in which aeronautical information is gathered and managed is governed by Annex 15 to the Convention on International Civil Aviation (ICAO Annex 15), which defines how an aeronautical information service shall receive and/or originate, collate or assemble, edit, format, publish/store and distribute specified aeronautical information/data. The goal is to satisfy the need for uniformity and consistency in the provision of aeronautical information/data that is required for operational use by international civil aviation.

ICAO Annex 15 specifies that aeronautical information should be published as an integrated aeronautical information package (IAIP), composed of the following elements:

- The Aeronautical Information Publication (AIP), including amendment services
  - AIP supplements
- Aeronautical Information Circulars (AIC)
- NOTAM (Notice to Air Missions)—alerts aircraft pilots of any hazards en route or at a specific location
  - Checklists and lists of valid NOTAM
- Pre-flight Information Bulletins (PIB)

Each element is used to distribute specific types of aeronautical information.

== ICAO Annex 15 ==
The ICAO Council first adopted the original Standards and Recommended Practices in 1953. Annex 15 has its origins in Article 37 of the Chicago Convention.

A total of 42 amendments updated Annex 15 over the years to meet the rapid changes brought about by air travel and associated information technology. In recent years, Annex 15 amendments have reflected the increased need for the timely provision of quality aeronautical information/data and terrain data as they have become critical components of data-dependent on-board navigation systems. The Annex now contains many provisions aimed at preventing corrupt or erroneous aeronautical information/data which can potentially affect the safety of air navigation.

The philosophy underlying Annex 15, which stems from Article 28 of the Convention on International Civil Aviation, is that each State is responsible for making available to civil aviation interests any and all information which is pertinent to and required for the operation of aircraft engaged in international civil aviation within its territory, as well as in areas outside its territory in which the State has air traffic control or other responsibilities.

== Transition from AIS to AIM ==
Despite the age of the Internet, satellite navigation and computer networks, the approach to aeronautical information distribution is still based on paper charts, paper documentation and telex-based text messages. Much of the data is entered more than once in different computers using a keyboard rather than by file transfer or database transactions.

The computer-based navigation systems, and area navigation (RNAV), required navigation performance (RNP) and air traffic management requirements, introduced a need for new corresponding AIS requirements for quality and timeliness of aeronautical information.

The role of present AIS would need to transform to an information management service, changing duties, responsibilities and scope to satisfy these new requirements and to cope with and manage the provision of information. The definition of a future high-level view as to the shape, nature and content of a strategy for the evolution from traditional product-centric AIS to the enlarged scope of data-centric aeronautical information management (AIM) began and ICAO took the lead at the global level with regard to the transition from AIS to AIM.

The aeronautical information services must transition to a broader concept of aeronautical information management, with a different method of information provision and management given its data-centric nature as opposed to the product-centric nature of AIS. The expectations are that the transition to AIM will not involve many changes in terms of the scope of information to be distributed. The major change will be the increased emphasis on data distribution, which should place the future AIM in a position to better serve airspace users and air traffic management in terms of their information management requirements.

== Aeronautical Information Service by Region/Country ==
=== Africa ===
State	Relevant AIS websites
South Africa	CAA Website
Egypt	AIS Webpage, NOTAM

=== Europe ===
State	Relevant AIS websites
Albania	AIS webpage EAD
Armenia	AIS webpage, eAIP, NOTAM EAD
Austria	AIS webpage Homebriefing EAD
Belgium	AIS webpage eAIP
Bulgaria	Bulatsa AIP webpage
Czech Republic	iAIP
Denmark	AIM Webpage
France	SIA
Germany	AIS webpage
Greece	AIS webpage
Hungary	AIS webpage
Netherlands	AIS webpage eAIP Homebriefing EAD
Norway	AIP webpage
Poland	AIS webpage
Portugal	AIS webpage
Romania	AIS webpage
Russia	AIS webpage
Serbia	AIP webpage
Slovakia	AIS webpage
Spain	AIS webpage
Sweden	AIS webpage
Switzerland	AIM services Briefing services EAD
UK	AIS webpage
Ukraine	AIS webpage EAD

=== South America ===
State	Relevant AIS websites
Argentina	AIP, SUP, AIC
Brazil	AIP, SUP, AIC, NOTAM, Charts
Chile	AIP, SUP, AIC, NOTAM, Charts
Colombia	AIP, SUP, AIC, NOTAM, Charts
Ecuador	AIP, SUP, AIC, NOTAM, Charts
Uruguay	AIP, SUP, AIC, NOTAM, Charts

=== Asia ===
State	Relevant AIS websites
Bahrain	AIM portal
Japan	AIP, SUP, AIC, NOTAM
Hong Kong	AIP, SUP, AIC, NOTAM
South Korea	AIP, NOTAM
Kyrgyzstan	AIP, AIC, NOTAMS
Mongolia	AIP, SUP, AIC
Saudi Arabia	ANS webpage
Sri Lanka	AIP, SUP, AIC, NOTAM
Taiwan	AIP, SUP, AIC, NOTAM
Uzbekistan	AIP, SUP, AIC, NOTAM

Not all contracting states of ICAO provide an online Aeronautical Information Service, and the following list may not be complete:

- Brazil
- China
- Curacao
- Finland
- Morocco
- Mongolia
- Norway
- Philippines
- Poland
- Portugal
- Singapore
- Sri Lanka
- Sweden
- Turkey
- United Kingdom
- United States
- Uzbekistan

== See also ==
- Flight service station
