= Qeqertalik =

Municipality of Greenland

Qeqertalik Den Ene med Øerne (Danish)
- Municipality
- Qeqertalik Municipality; Qeqertalik Kommunia (Greenlandic); Qeqertalik Kommune (Danish)
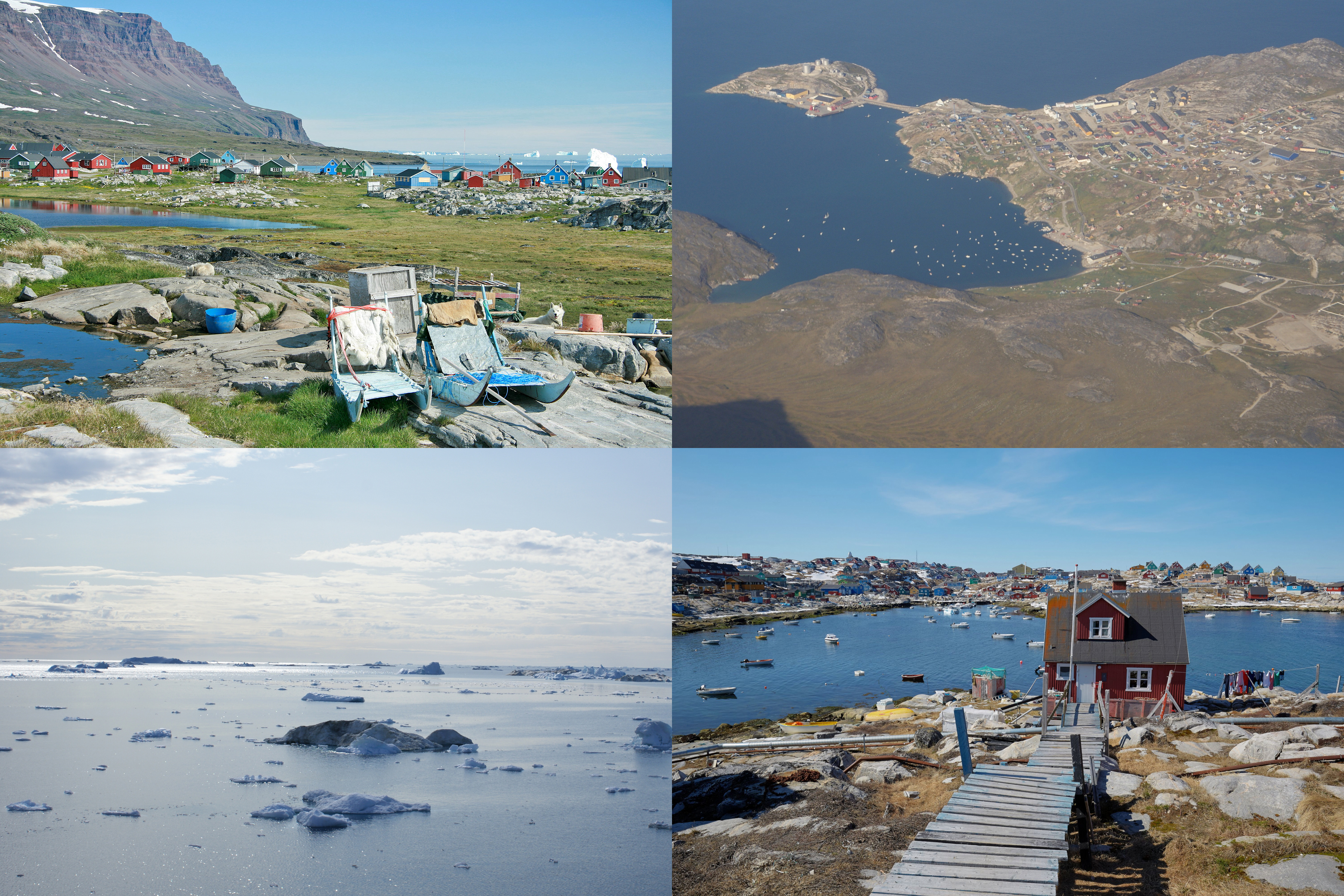
- Clockwise from top left: Qeqertarsuaq, Qasigiannguit, Aasiaat, Disko Bay

- Flag Coat of arms

- Location of Qeqertalik within Greenland
- Coordinates (Qeqertalik Commune): 68°42′N 52°52′W
- Sovereign state: Kingdom of Denmark
- Country: Greenland
- Established: 1 January 2018
- Municipal center: Aasiaat

Government
  - Mayor: Simigaq Heilmann (Demokraatit)

Area
  - Total: 62,400 km^{2} (24,100 sq mi)

Population (1 January 2025)
  - Total: 5,969
  - Density: 0.0957/km^{2} (0.248/sq mi)
- Time zone: UTC-02, UTC-01
- Calling code: +299
- ISO 3166 code: GL-QT
- Website: qeqertalik.gl

Qeqertalik (Greenlandic pronunciation: [qɜqɜtːalik], Danish: Område med øer, lit. 'Area with islands') is a municipality of Greenland created in 2018 from four southern regions of the former Qaasuitsup Municipality. It is the least populated municipality at a population of 5,969, despite this it is the 2nd most densely populated municipality with 0.09 people per square kilometer.

== Geography ==
Qeqertalik Municipality is flanked in the south by the Qeqqata municipality and in the northeast by Avannaata. Over the ice cap, it is bordered in the east by the Sermersooq municipality, however this border runs north–south (45° West meridian) through the center of the Greenland ice sheet (Greenlandic: Sermersuaq), and as such is free of traffic.

Communities of Qeqertalik encircle Disko Bay, an inlet of the larger Baffin Bay, while the northeastern shores and Nuussuaq Peninsula belong to the neighboring municipality of Avannaata.

== Politics ==
Qeqertalik's municipal council consists of 15 members, elected every four years.

=== Municipal council ===
Election	Party					Total seats	Turnout	Elected mayor
Election	A	D	IA	N	S	Total seats	Turnout	Elected mayor
2017	1		7		7	15	68.3%	Ane Hansen (IA)
2021	1	1	9		4	15	70.0%	Ane Hansen (IA)
2025	1	4	3	1	6	15	57.4%	Simigaq Heilmann (D) (D-IA-N coalition)
Data from Valg.gl

== Administrative divisions ==
=== Aasiaat area ===
- Aasiaat (Egedesminde)
- Akunnaaq
- Kitsissuarsuit (Hunde Ejlande, Dog's Island)

=== Kangaatsiaq area ===
- Kangaatsiaq
- Attu
- Iginniarfik
- Ikerasaarsuk
- Niaqornaarsuk

=== Qasigiannguit area ===
- Qasigiannguit (Christianshåb)
- Ikamiut

=== Qeqertarsuaq area ===
- Qeqertarsuaq (Godhavn)
- Kangerluk

== Language ==
Kalaallisut, the West Greenlandic dialect, is spoken in Kommune Qeqertalik; Danish is also spoken in the area.

== See also ==
- KANUKOKA
