= Transport in Greenland =

Transport in Greenland is very unusual in that there are virtually no roads between towns, no railways, and no inland waterways. Historically most transport has been by boat around the coast in summer and, particularly in the north and east, by dog sled in winter. Today, transport by fixed wing aircraft or helicopter is the primary mode of transport, along with sea freight.

== Air transport ==
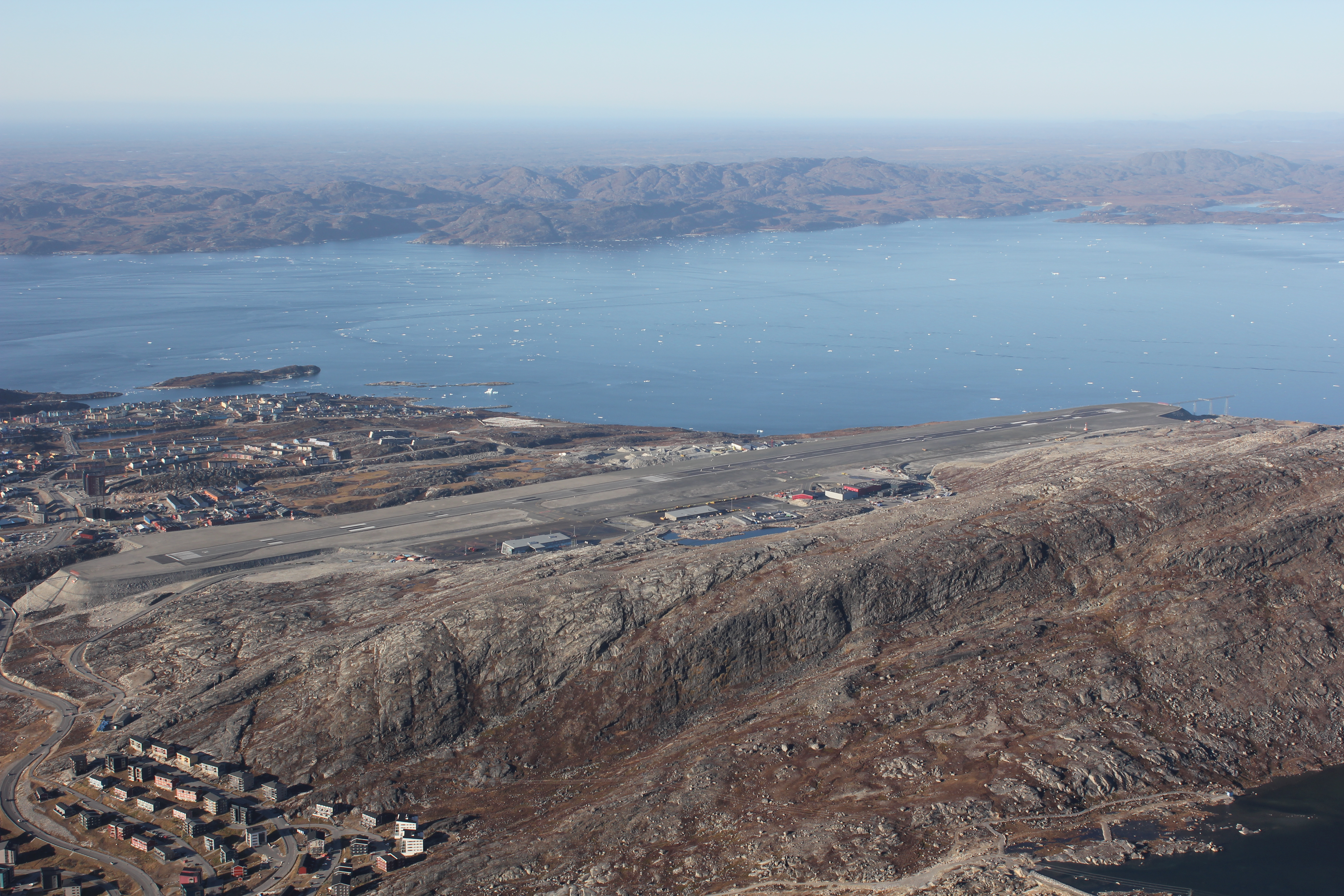
Nuuk Airport

Air transport is the most important method of year-round transport in Greenland. Greenland has 25 airports, 14 of which are paved, supplemented by 47 heliports mostly serving small settlements. 14 airports and 8 heliports have scheduled air services. All domestic flights are operated by Air Greenland, with their hub located in the capital at Nuuk Airport.

All civilian airports are operated by Greenland Airports and are regulated by the Danish Civil Aviation and Railway Authority.

Year-round scheduled International flights are to Copenhagen and Keflavík-Reykjavík Airport, Iceland. Other airlines operate seasonal and charter flights. Icelandair flies from Keflavík-Reykjavík to Nuuk, Kulusuk, Ilulissat and Narsarsuaq. Air Greenland has also operated a route from Iqaluit in Canada to Nuuk during summer during some years.

=== History ===
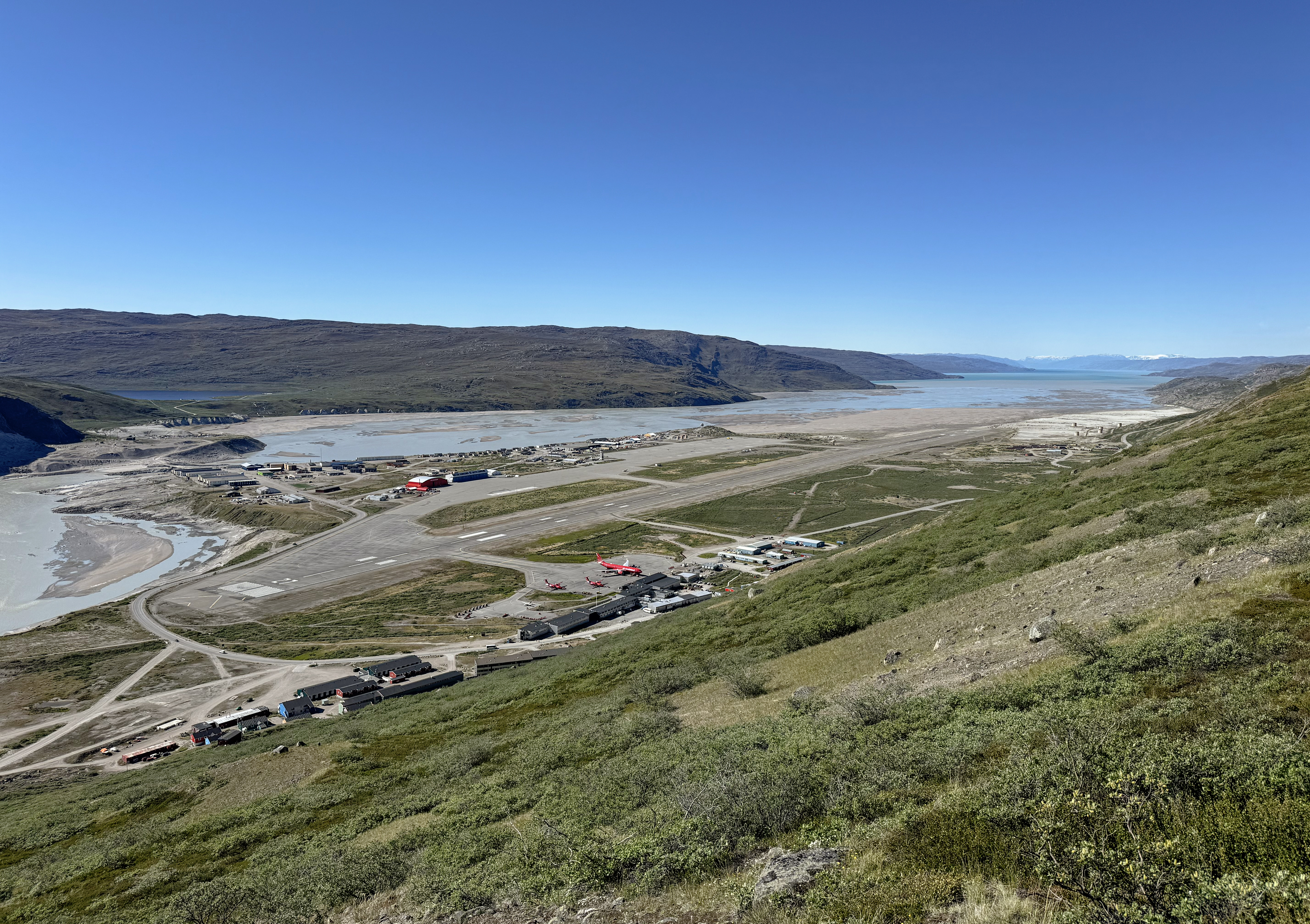
Kangerlussuaq Airport

Aviation in Greenland was historically primarily reliant on airports built for military purposes during World War II by the United States. These air bases were built away from major settlements, as they were intended only to serve military purposes, located in stable weather and in part to downplay U.S. military presence in Greenland. After the war, some remained active for military purposes but as they were the only aviation infrastructure in Greenland, began to serve civilian purposes too, despite their ill-suited locations.

Kangerlussuaq Airport, built as Sondrestrom Air Base (Bluie West Eight), served as Greenland's international and domestic hub from the 1950s as it was the only airport large enough to support larger jet aircraft. As a result, travel to larger towns in Greenland usually required a transfer at Kangerlussuaq. It was handed over to Greenlandic Authorities in 1992 after the closure of the U.S. base, but remains in limited military use by the Joint Arctic Command in addition to its civilian use. Kangerlussuaq remained Greenland's aviation hub until the opening of the rebuilt Nuuk Airport in 2024. It still has the longest runway in Greenland, and is considered to have more stable weather than its coastal airports.

Narsarsuaq Airport, built as Bluie West One, serves as a regional hub in South Greenland. Kulusuk Airport, built to serve DYE-4 is also a regional hub for the area and one of only two civilian airports in East Greenland.

Pituffik Space Base (Thule) was built in 1953 and remains a U.S. military base to this day.

=== New airports ===
In 1979, a STOL airport was constructed in Nuuk followed by Ilulissat in 1984. Fixed-wing flights using smaller aircraft were now possible, reducing transport costs and increasing service. As a result of its success, in 1998-2007, the Greenlandic Government began building a network of STOL airports in 8 major towns in western Greenland to improve transport by moving away from the dependence on helicopters between towns. The airports built by the Greenlandic government were at Ilulissat, Sisimiut, Aasiaat, Maniitsoq, Qaarsut, Qaanaaq, Upernavik and Paamiut.

A major development in Greenlandic aviation occurred in 2016, when it was decided that three new or rebuilt airports would be built in Nuuk, Ilulissat and Qaqortoq. These airports will accommodate larger jet aircraft which can serve international destinations, at a cost of 3.6 billion DKK (approximately $560 million), primarily financed by the Danish state. This will majorly improve access to Greenland's largest towns and end the use of ill-placed prior military bases as aviation hubs. Kangerlussuaq Airport will lose hub status to Nuuk Airport and Ilulissat Airport, while Narsarsuaq Airport will be replaced by Qaqortoq Airport.

The first of the new airports, Nuuk Airport, was opened in 2024 and subsequently most international traffic transitioned there. The other two airports, Ilulissat and Qaqortoq are due to open in 2026.

== Roads ==
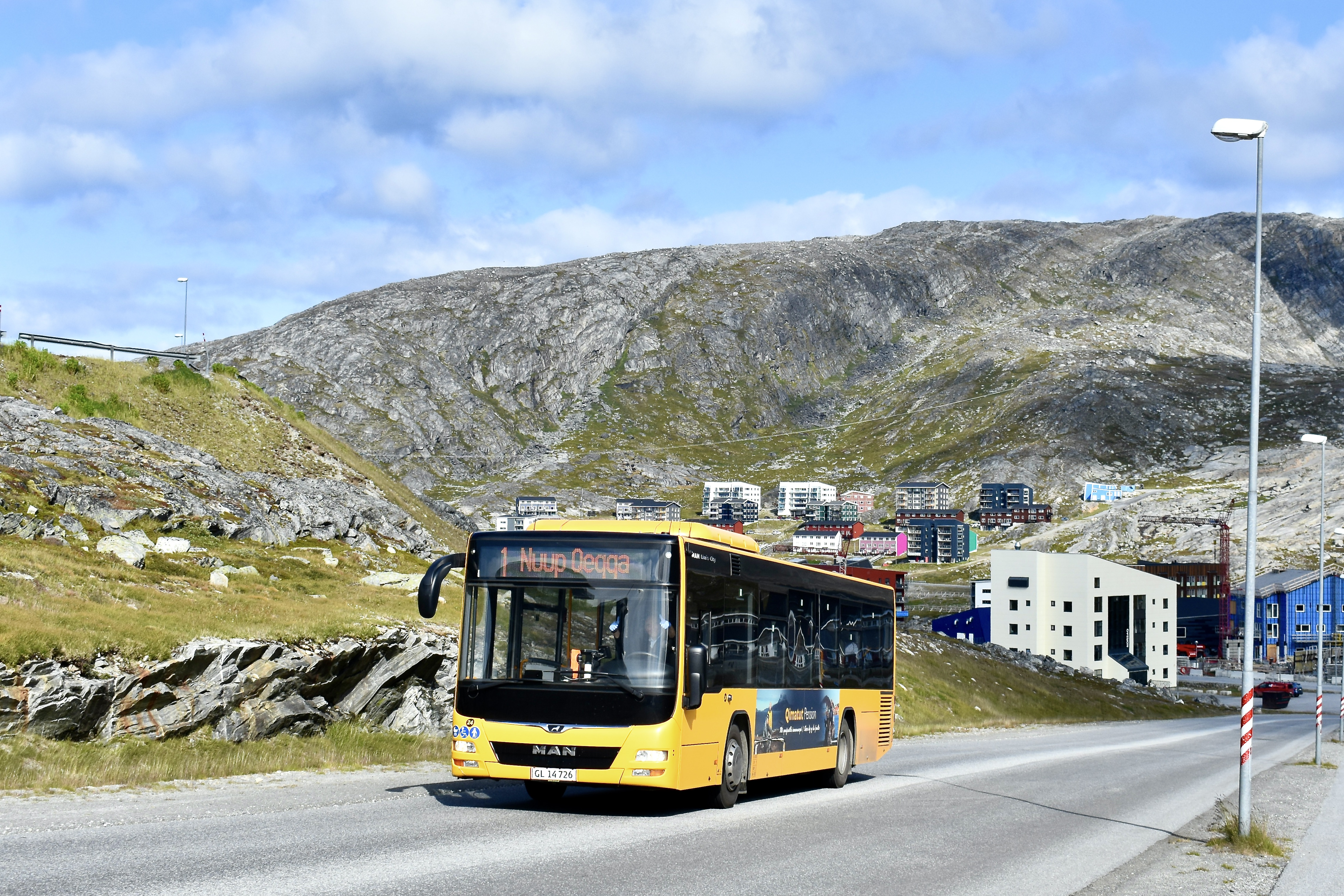
Bus of Nuup Bussii A/S in Nuuk

Generally, there are no roads between settlements in Greenland, only within them and around them. As of 2017, there are 383 kilometres (238 mi) of local roads within towns. Most roads are paved within towns but some sections are unpaved. There are three traffic lights, 12 roundabouts in Greenland and one road tunnel, all located in the capital, Nuuk.

The national speed limit is 40 km/h (25 mph) in the whole of Greenland, except where otherwise signposted up to a maximum 60 km/h (37 mph).

Bus systems operate within the towns of Nuuk, Sisimiut, Ilulissat, Maniitsoq, Qaqortoq and Kangerlussuaq.

=== Interurban roads ===
There are no roads between settlements that are capable of handling normal traffic. Some rudimentary tracks traversable by all-terrain vehicles are present in some areas, mostly sheep farms in the south and in Qeqqata municipality. These roads or tracks are of low quality and not included in the length of the road network, but total approximately 290 km (not included in the above figures).

There are some other short simple gravel roads, such as that leading from the shore to remote hydropower plants and communication sites, but are self-contained. There is a 4.5 km long asphalt road between the abandoned towns of Ivittuut and Kangilinnguit.

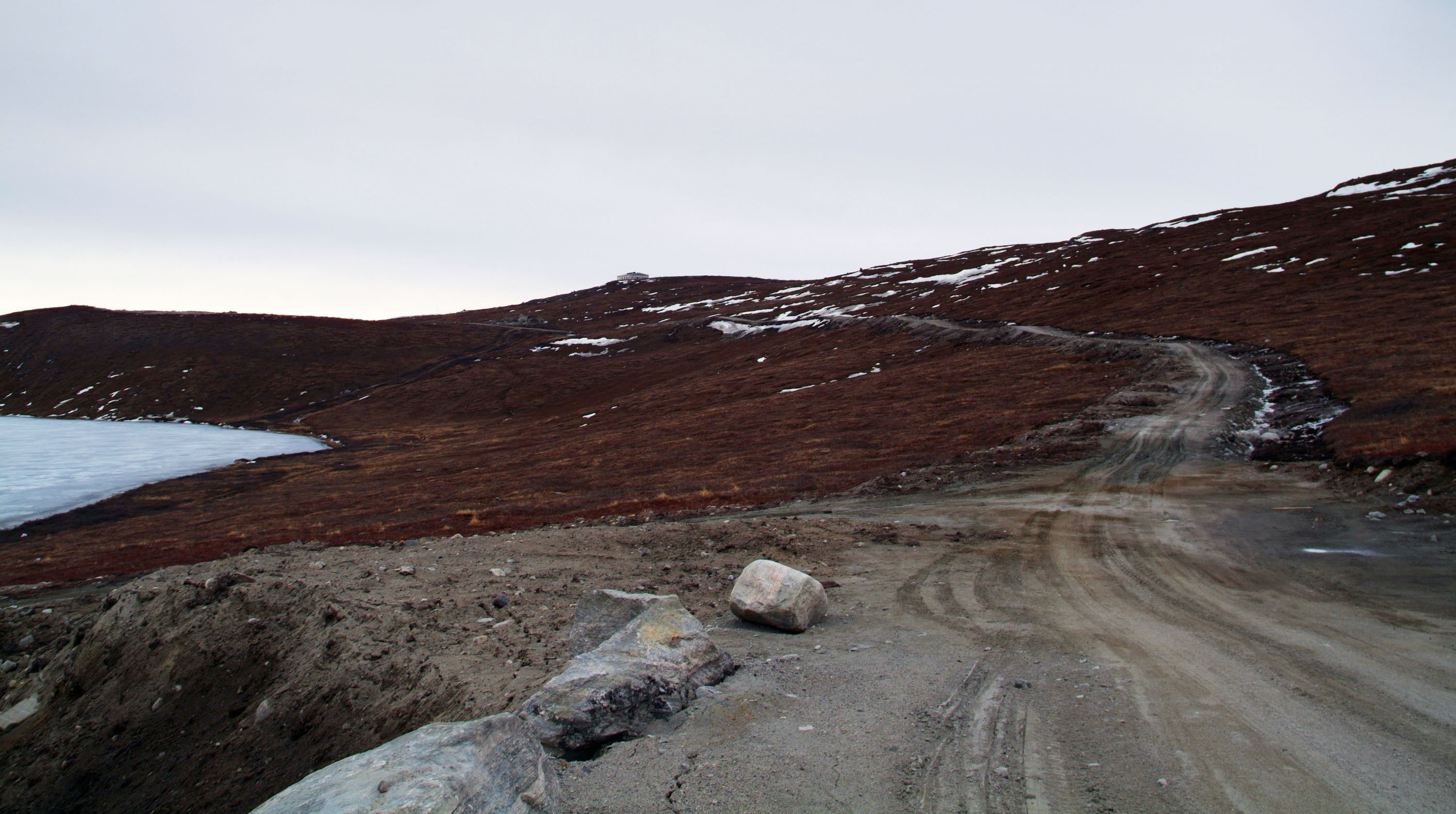
Kangerlussuaq-Sisimiut track

==== Kangerlussuaq road network and ATV track to Sisimiut ====
An existing road network in Kangerlussuaq was built by the U.S. military when it was Sondrestrom Air Base, linking communication sites, the port and the Sondrestrom Upper Atmospheric Research Facility. Additionally, in 1999, Nausta A/S built a 35 km-long road on behalf of Volkswagen to the edge of the Greenland ice sheet, where they conducted winter car testing. Volkswagen left the site in 2005 and the road was returned to the municipality and is now used for tourism and research purposes. These roads in and around Kangerlussuaq total approximately 70 km (43 mi), thereof 15 km (10 mi) paved with asphalt.

A 130 kilometre-long (80 mi) track between the towns of Sisimiut and Kangerlussuaq, traversable by all-terrain vehicles, UTVs and off-road vehicles (Unimog-type vehicles) was opened in 2025. It is dubbed the 'Arctic Circle Track', and follows a similar route to the Arctic Circle Trail. It is the first land based connection between two towns in Greenland, outside of snowmobile and dog-sled transport in winter. The track is very rudimentary in construction and was built in 2021-2025, at a cost of 25 million DKK (€3M). It is envisioned that this track will be upgraded in the future to a proper gravel road, at an estimated cost of 500 million Danish krone (€67M), no timeline is in place.

==== South Greenland road network ====
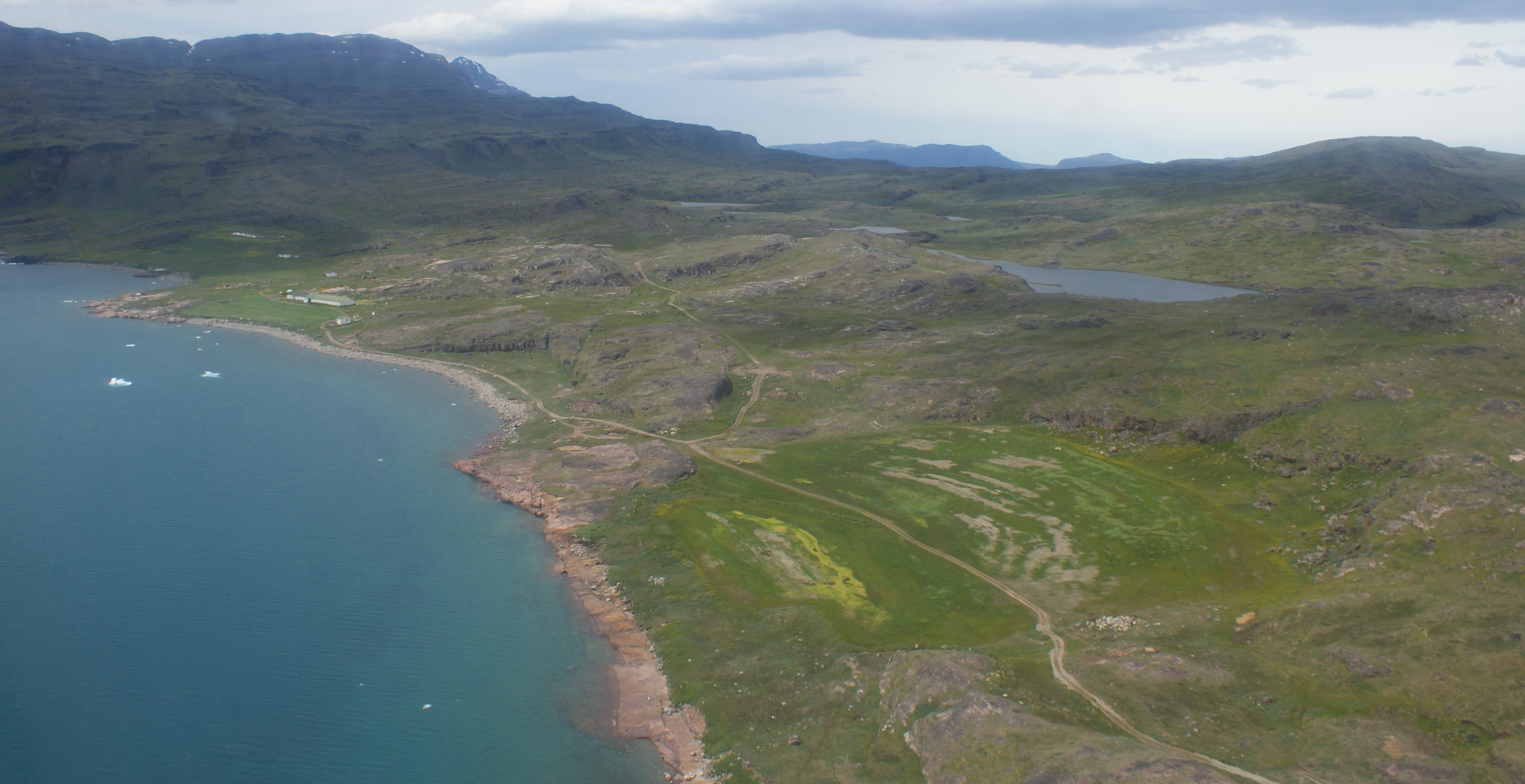
ATV tracks around Qassiarsuk

In the area around Qassiarsuk, a very simple road network suitable for all-terrain vehicles, totalling around 80 km (50 mi) exists connecting a handful of sheep farms with the town. This network reaches a glacial river by Narsarsuaq Airport, which is unbridged and can only be crossed by larger vehicles.

A bridge over the river at Narsarsuaq has been proposed, as well as a 40 km extension of the road network to Narsaq and a general improvement of the currently simple road network. Separately, a road and ferry connection from Narsaq to Qaqortoq has been proposed, with a tunnel being another option. If all these proposals are implemented, this would create a continuous 'South Greenland road network' linking Narsarsuaq, Narsaq and Qaqortoq, although is highly unlikely due to the extreme cost.

== Water transport ==
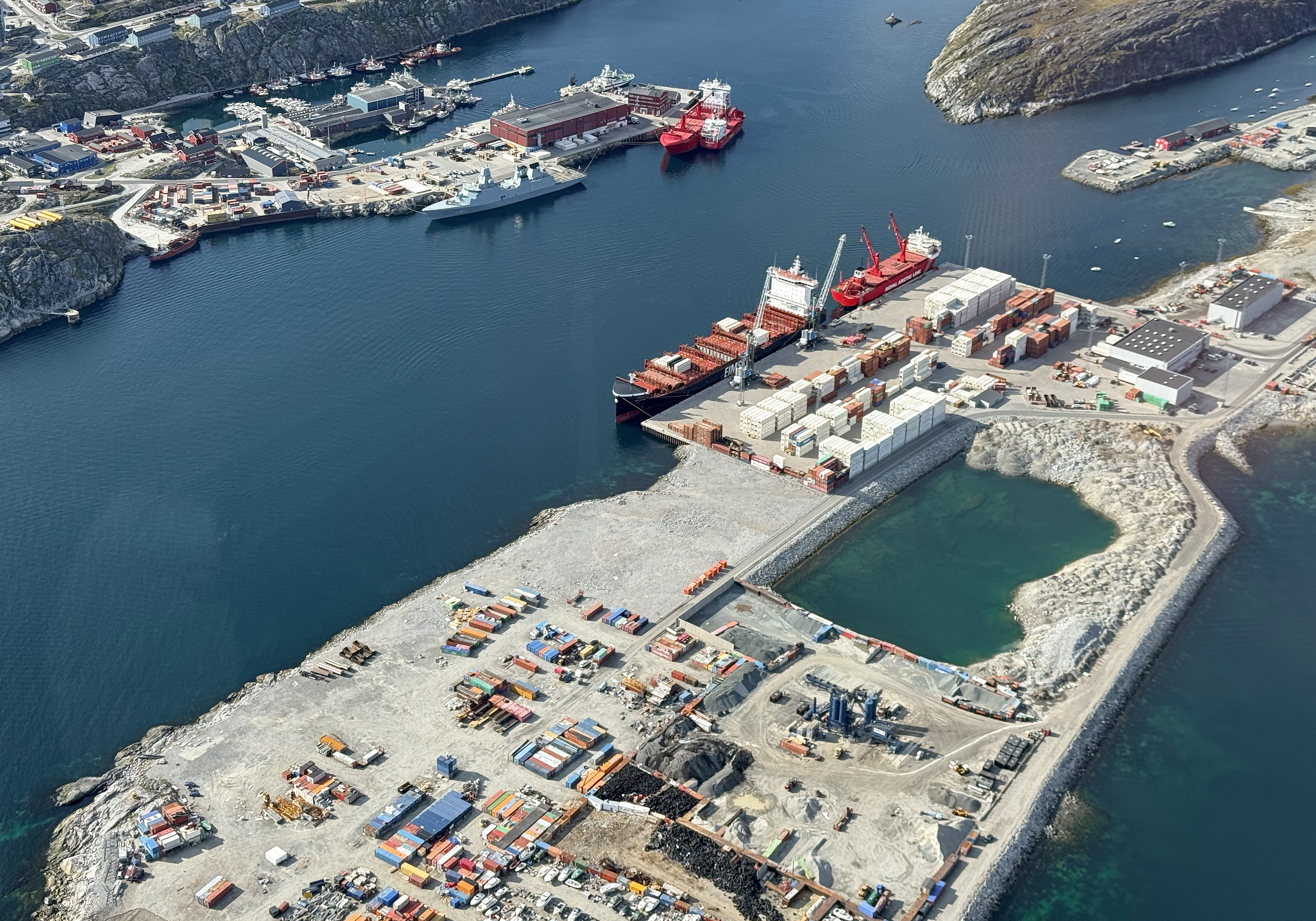
Nuuk Port

There are ports at Ilulissat, Kangerlussuaq, Qaqortoq, Narsaq, Nuuk, Aasiaat and Sisimiut. Several other towns have also small ports. The main users of the harbours are Royal Arctic Line, Arctic Umiaq Line and Eimskip. Royal Arctic Line, in cooperation with Eimskip, organises container shipping with regular sailings from Denmark and Iceland. Arctic Umiaq Line runs a passenger ship which also carries freight. Nuuk is a major international port, and the overwhelming part of domestic transports from Nuuk are by ship. The distance from Denmark to Nuuk by ship is 3,800 kilometres (2,400 mi/2,000 nmi/4 days at 20 knots), so more perishable foodstuff is imported by air.

There are no car ferries in or to Greenland. It is possible to transport cars as container freight with Royal Arctic Line (both domestic and from Denmark). Passengers must travel by another method. This is done mostly when moving or buying a car, not normally when travelling, as there is no large road network anywhere.

Many of the tourists to Greenland arrive by cruise ship.

== Railways ==
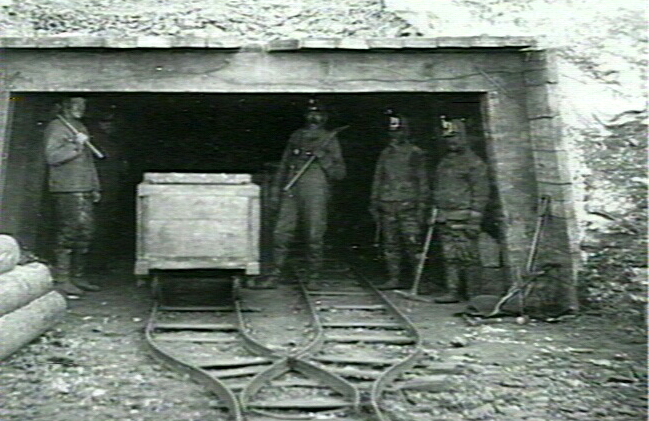
Mine in Qaarsut

Historically, special-purpose narrow gauge railways have operated, for purposes such as fish and mining.

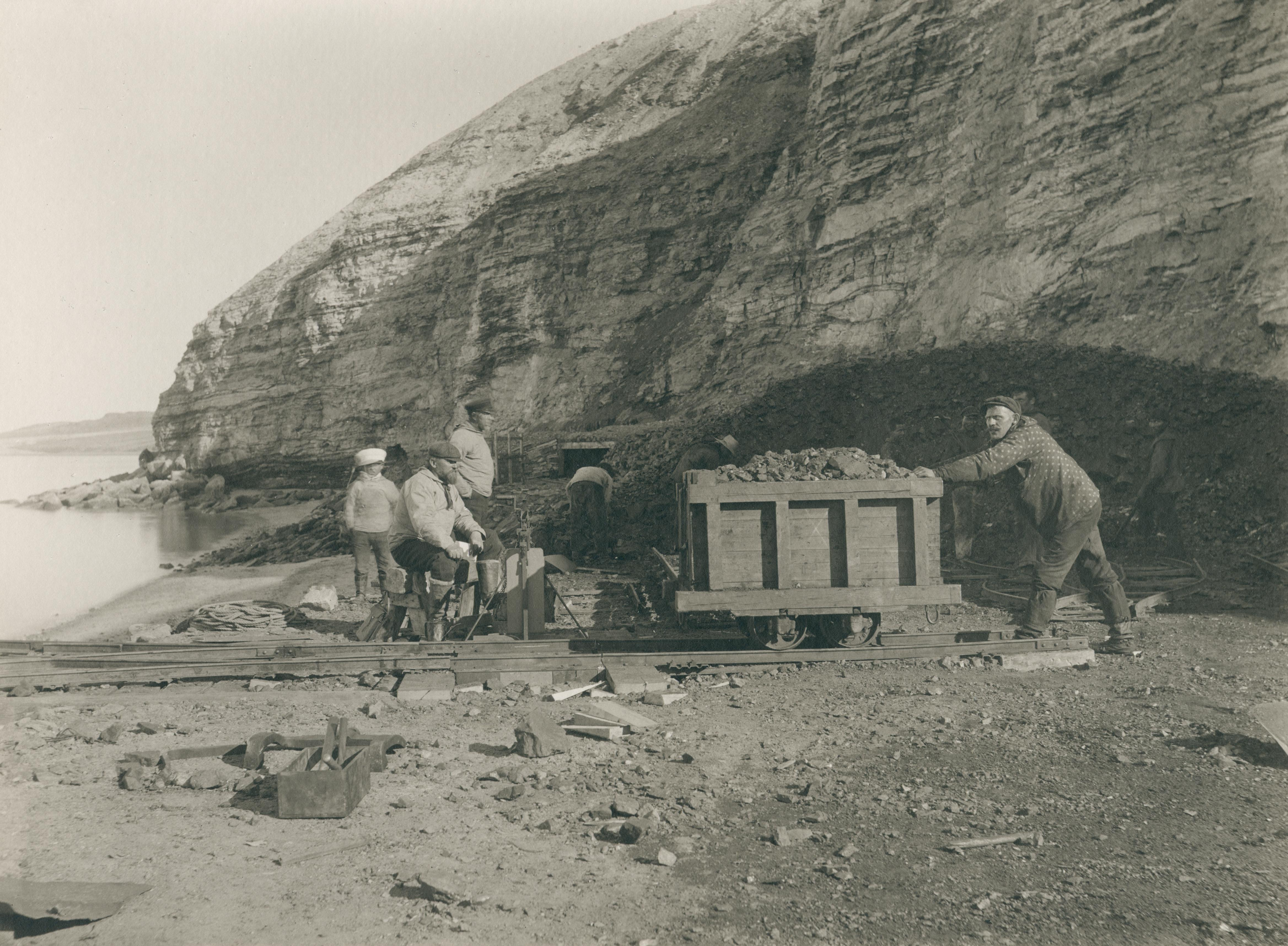
The coal mine at Qaarsuarsuk

- The 600 mm (1 ft 11 5/8 in) "Qoornoq X-press" railway in the village of Qoornoq in the Nuuk fjord was used for transporting fish from the harbour to scaffolds for drying. The railway cars were only flatbed wagon cars with no locomotives to move them. Built in 1955, the railway was abandoned shortly before the village around 1971.
- Malmbjerg
- Mestersvig – From 1956 to 1963, Mestersvig was a zinc and lead mine, where a railway was likely in use.
- Qaqortoq
- Ivigtut – Cryolite quarry that once operated in the community, had locomotives.
- Disko Island near Qullissat
- Maamorilik Ivigtut
