= Nuuk Airport =

Airport in Nuuk, Greenland

Nuuk Airport Mittarfik Nuuk
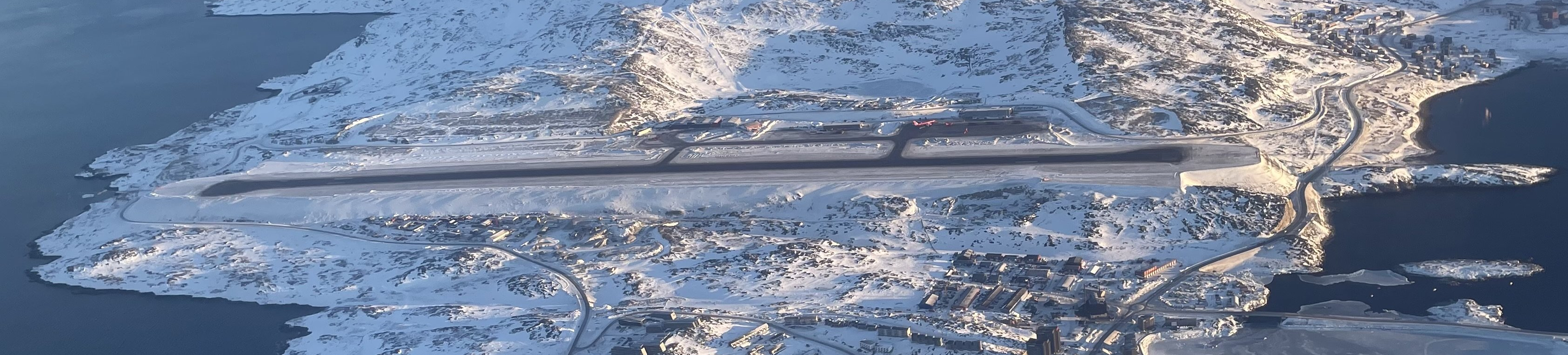
- Nuuk Airport, January 2025
- IATA: GOH; ICAO: BGGH

Summary
- Airport type: Public
- Operator: Greenland Airports
- Serves: Nuuk, Greenland
- Opened: 1 October 1979
- Hub for: Air Greenland
- Elevation AMSL: 283 ft (86 m)
- Coordinates: 64°11′27″N 051°40′41″W
- Website: airports.gl/en/airport/nuuk

Map
- Location in Greenland

Runways
Direction	Length		Surface
Direction	m	ft	Surface
04/22	2,200	7,218	Asphalt

Statistics (2012)
- Passengers: 69,324
- Aircraft movements: 4,162
- Source: Danish AIS; Statistics from airport

Nuuk Airport (Greenlandic: Mittarfik Nuuk, Danish: Nuuk Lufthavn, formerly Godthåb Lufthavn; IATA: GOH, ICAO: BGGH) is an international airport serving Nuuk, the capital of Greenland. The airport is the hub and technical base for Air Greenland, the flag carrier airline of Greenland. International routes are also provided by Icelandair on a year-round basis and United Airlines seasonally.

The airport was originally constructed for STOL-capable aircraft in 1979. In 2019–2024, the airport was comprehensively rebuilt and expanded, including a runway extension and a new terminal, which allows larger jet aircraft to serve more international destinations. Previously, longer-distance jet traffic was operated from Kangerlussuaq Airport, necessitating transfers and longer journey times.

== Geography ==
The airport is located 2 NM (3.7 km; 2.3 mi) northeast of Nuuk Centrum. The former suburbs of Nuuk, such as Nuussuaq, Quassussuup Tungaa, and Qinngorput, incorporated into the town in the last decade, have brought the city closer to the airport.

As of 2010 the airport is within walking distance of the nearest continuously inhabited area, its runway approximately 700 m (2,300 ft) from the University of Greenland campus. There is an alpine ski course only 200 metres (660 ft) from the airport.

== History ==
=== Seaplane era ===
In the early 1960s, after the establishment of Air Greenland on 7 November 1960 as Grønlandsfly, Nuuk was served exclusively by the PBY Catalina flying boat, with the aircraft using the waterways of the Nuuk Port as a landing site. In 1962 a Catalina crashed near the port, killing 15 people on board.

=== Helicopter era ===
On 31 May 1965, a heliport was opened in Nuuk, located close to where the Inussivik sports centre is today (at 64.180275°N 51.730082°W). The heliport had hangar and maintenance facilities for the helicopters.

The 1962 tragedy was one of the factors leading to the decision to invest in a helicopter fleet. The Sikorsky S-61N machines proved to be a more reliable mode of transport for the city, providing exclusive service for the Nuuk city for more than a decade—from the purchase date in 1965 until the late 1970s.

Even in the later era of the fixed-wing, turboprop plane domination, the S-61N helicopters continued to link Nuuk with the smaller town of Paamiut, until the airport was built there in 2007.

=== Regional airport network ===
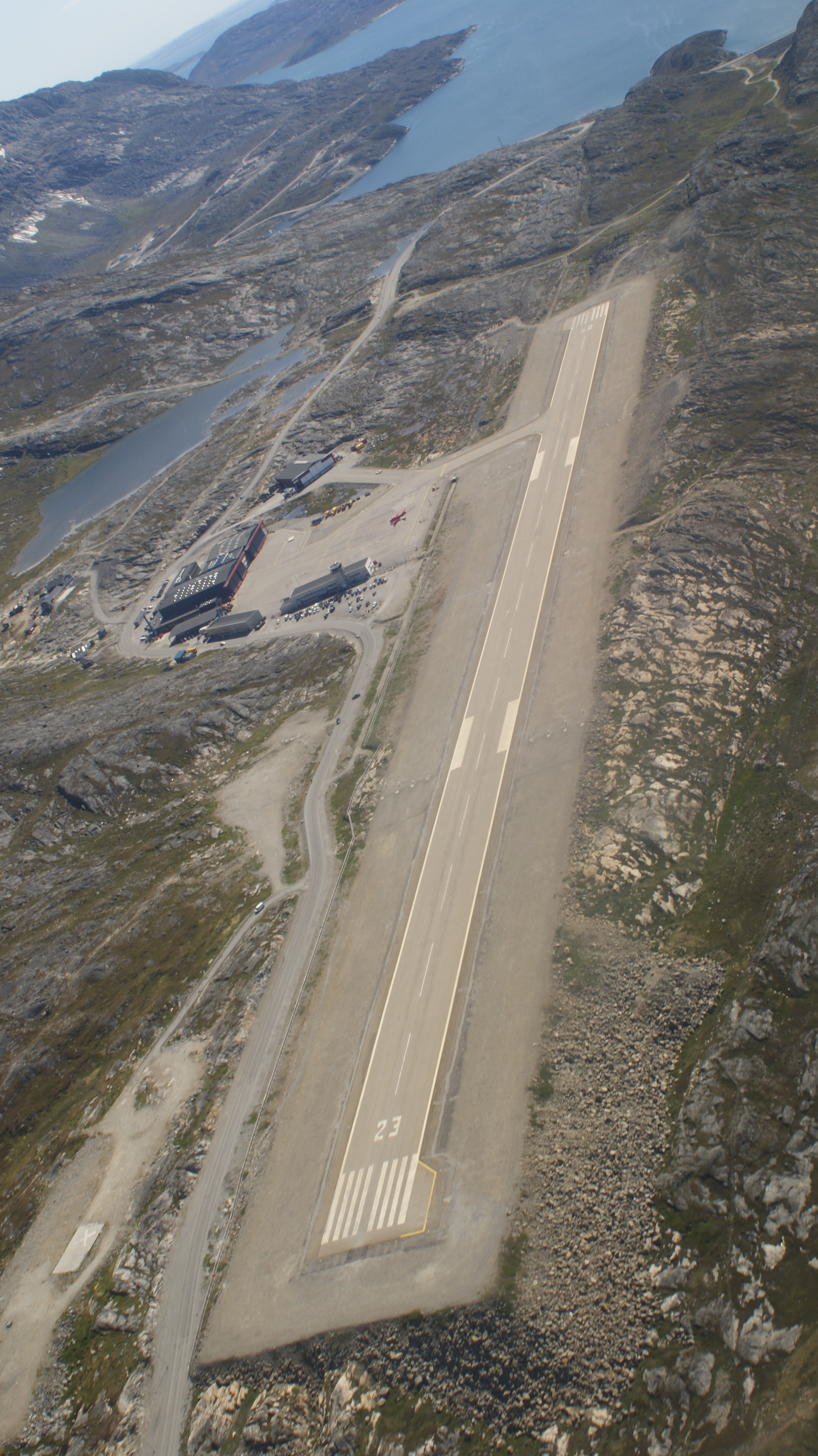
Former runway, as originally built

Nuuk Airport was opened on 1 October 1979, when the then newly formed home rule government decided to create a network of the STOL-capable domestic airports.

Nuuk airport was originally constructed with one asphalt runway (05/23) 950 m × 30 m (3,117 ft × 98 ft), located 283 ft (86 m) above sea level. The airport terminal and apron were built on a levelled platform on an undulating slope under the Quassussuaq mountain, with the runway platform artificially elevated to compensate for the scarp immediately to the west. The runway platform bed was composed of broken rock and rubble, topped with gravel, and was protected by a low, wooden fence.

The airport in Nuuk, the largest city in Greenland, was a priority for the government. A STOLport was subsequently constructed in Ilulissat, the largest town in the Disko Bay region of western Greenland. Kulusuk Airport was also repurposed from its prior military use. This constituted the first such wave of network expansion.

=== Network expansion ===
The first international flights from Nuuk Airport were to Iqaluit in Nunavut, Canada, operated from 1981 until it was discontinued due to commercial unviability in 1994. Flights to Reykjavik, Iceland via Kulusuk also began in 1981.

It was not until the late 1990s to early 2000s that the network experienced another spurt of large-scale growth, when the airports in the remaining larger towns were built: Sisimiut Airport in Sisimiut and Maniitsoq Airport in Maniitsoq in central-western Greenland, Aasiaat Airport in the Disko Bay region, Upernavik Airport in Upernavik in northwestern Greenland, and Qaarsut Airport, an airport in Qaarsut, a settlement in the Uummannaq Fjord region; the airport serving both the village and the larger town of Uummannaq, located on the rocky Uummannaq Island.

=== 2000 onwards ===
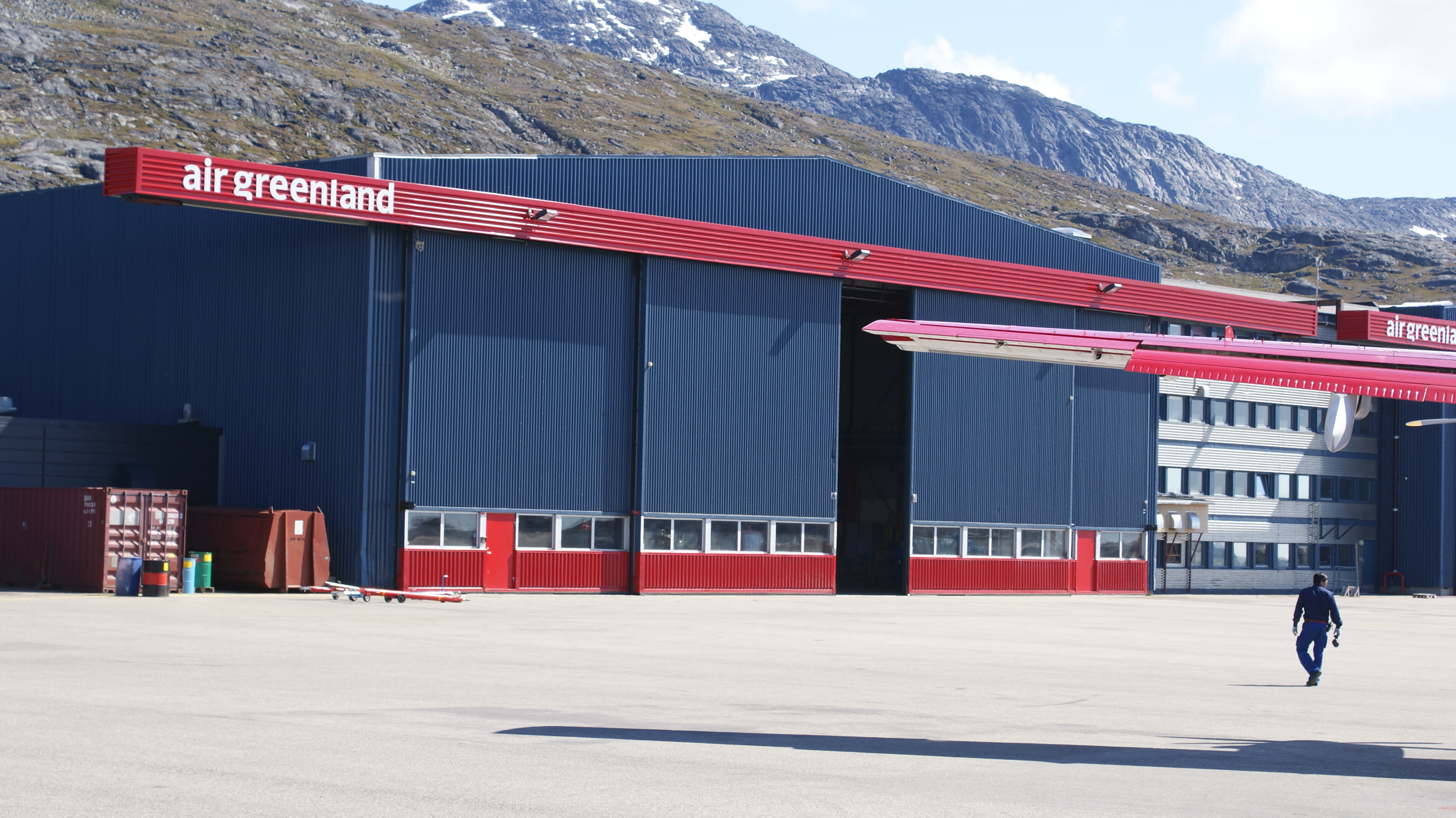
Air Greenland has its technical base at Nuuk Airport (hangars pictured).

Former main apron. The tower and terminal pictured were demolished in 2024

Due to the commercial inviability of international flights to Canada and Iceland using smaller STOL aircraft, for years afterwards international flights to Greenland were limited to Kangerlussuaq Airport in central western Greenland, 319 km (198 mi) to the north of Nuuk, an airport inherited from the U.S. Air Force when the former Sondrestrom Air Base was handed over to the then home rule government on 30 September 1992.

With the airport being limited to serving small planes, the possibilities for international connections remained limited. Icelandair opened a direct route from Reykjavik to Nuuk in 2007. In order to compete with Icelandair, which operates services to Nuuk, Narsarsuaq, Ilulissat, and all airports on the eastern coast, Air Greenland announced opening of new connections with Iceland, linking Nuuk and Narsarsuaq with Keflavík International Airport, later restricting it to Nuuk.

Air Greenland's seasonal flights to Iqaluit in Canada resumed in summer 2012, but ended before summer 2015. Air Greenland relaunched its summer seasonal route between Nuuk and Iqaluit with a once-weekly frequency for the 2024 season using its Dash 8.

The airport is also used for various charter flights, such as airlifts to the summit of the 1,210 m (3,970 ft) Sermitsiaq Mountain, a landmark of Nuuk, located on Sermitsiaq Island north of the airport.

The airport is also used for shuttle flights for events like the 2010 Inuit Circumpolar Council general assembly in Nuuk. and for the 2016 Arctic Winter Games. In general the short runway was a problem for large events in Nuuk. Most, charter, VIP and extra flights from outside Greenland could not land in Nuuk (or any other city of Greenland), so Air Greenland needed to shuttle passengers between Kangerlussuaq and Nuuk, using planes much smaller than the charter planes, often requiring a hotel night in Kangerlussuaq.

=== Proposals for expansion ===
Considering the growth of Nuuk as a commercial and administrative centre in Greenland as well as increasing tourism, there was a need to improve flight connections to the country's capital. More than a third of Greenland's populace resides in Nuuk and the majority of the country's significant institutions are situated in the city. The requirement to change planes in Kangerlussuaq for most international flights proved costly and time-consuming for passengers, particularly for larger groups utilizing long-distance charter planes.

The short runway was highly problematic, as it made the airfield unusable even for regional jet aircraft; for instance, the Bombardier CRJ family with 50–100 seats. It instead required highly-specialised STOL-capable aircraft to be used, which are limited both in size and in numbers. Air Greenland has been using Dash 8-200 aircraft with 37 seats.

The airport expansion issue had been a long-standing topic of controversy in Greenland. Many challenges and issues arose in deciding the future of the airport, including cost, flight safety, commercial effects on Air Greenland and implications on service frequency to other areas of Greenland.

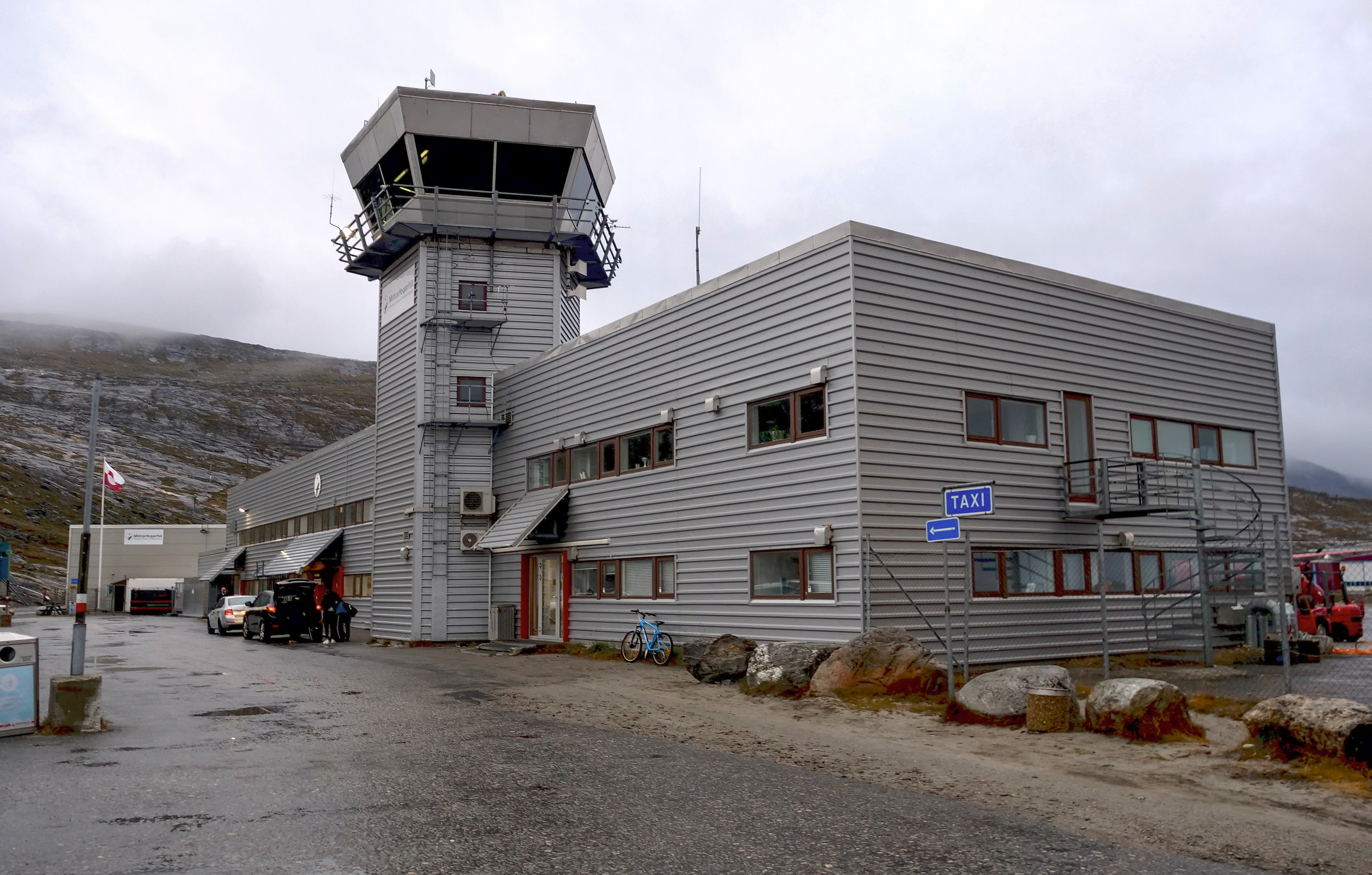
The former terminal building in 2019

Operational challenges for an extended Nuuk Airport included challenging weather and geographical constraints. Rough weather in the region was cited as life-threatening to larger airplanes, given the additional difficulty of approach in a mountainous region. The northern end of the runway was less than 700 m (2,300 ft) from the shore of Nuup Kangerlua fjord. An expansion of the runway in that direction would require relocation of the connecting road, which climbs under the runway scarp. An extension of the runway in the other direction would have brought the endpoint close to Qinngorput, the newest district of Nuuk, which was rapidly expanding in the late 2000s. Also, concerns were raised regarding maintaining air service to Nuuk during construction.

Air Greenland was initially resistant to relocating its hub, pointing out the financial implications of such a move, and highlighting the consistently favourable weather conditions at Kangerlussuaq. Situated deep inland, about 30 km (19 mi) from the fringe of the Greenland ice sheet (known as Greenlandic: Sermersuaq), Kangerlussuaq benefits from excellent infrastructure and unhindered visibility, unlike the coastal fogs, storms, heavy snowfall, and frequent turbulence prevalent near the coastline. However, since 2010 there were few suitable aircraft for purchase having more than 30 seats and able to use short runways like Nuuk's. When the existing Dash-8 200 retire or more aircraft are needed, a longer runway is necessary.

These well-substantiated arguments in favor of maintaining the prior arrangement posed a challenge for the Government of Greenland. Air connections were essential for cruise ship passengers, as staying onboard from Europe or the USA and back is often too time-consuming and expensive. Some cruise ships took the extended route to Kangerlussuaq to facilitate passenger exchange (as there is no suitable port, passengers must transfer to small boats), while others utilize the Nuuk-Kangerlussuaq feeder flights. However, these flights had insufficient capacity for cruise ships. Direct charter flights were desired. Expanding the runway would bolster cruise ship tourism.

Suggestions were to extend it from 950 to 1,199 m (3,117–3,934 ft), to 1,700 m (5,600 ft), or 2,200 m (7,200 ft) (the longest possible) the latter would allow direct flights to Denmark. The terminal building was too small for mid-sized aircraft, so any runway extension for direct Denmark flights would need a new terminal building also. Another suggested alternative was to build a new airport on one of the islands of Angisunnguaq or Qeqertarssuaq, locations having less turbulence, and allowing 2,800 m (9,200 ft) runway needed for the large planes for flights to Denmark. These are located a few kilometres south of Nuuk and would need a bridge or tunnel connection. Such a project could cost somewhere around 2–3 billion DKK (cost calculated 2010).

Another alternative proposed involved making Keflavík Airport (Iceland's primary international airport) the international hub instead of Kangerlussuaq, and slightly expanding the Nuuk Airport runway to accommodate small jet planes. (Icelandair has already established a seasonal network connecting Greenland). This would need flights also from Keflavík to Narsarsuaq and to Ilulissat and reduce the passenger numbers for domestic Greenland and need extra freight flights with the small aircraft able use these airports.

=== New runway and airport construction ===
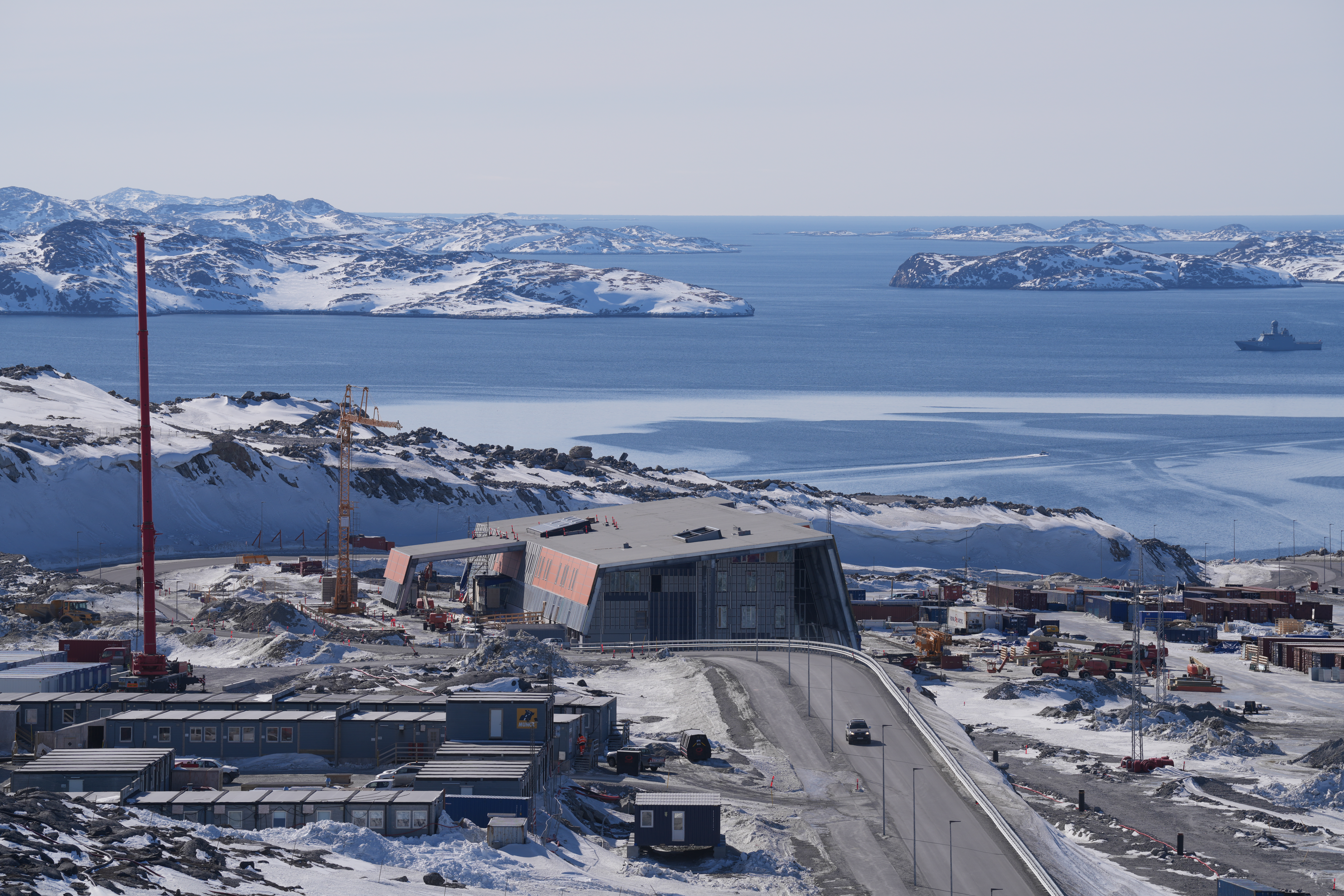
New terminal under construction in 2023

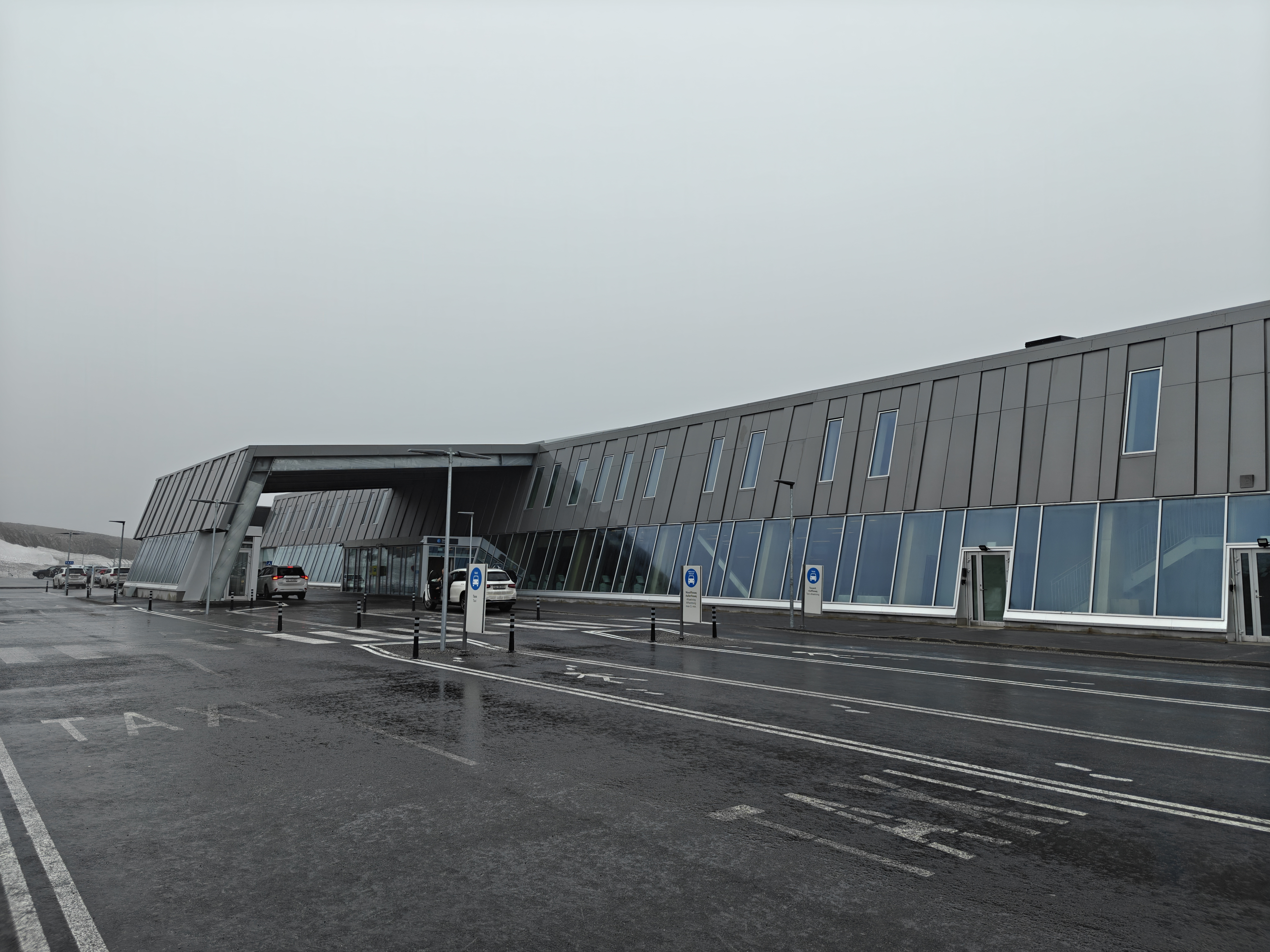
Entrance to the new terminal

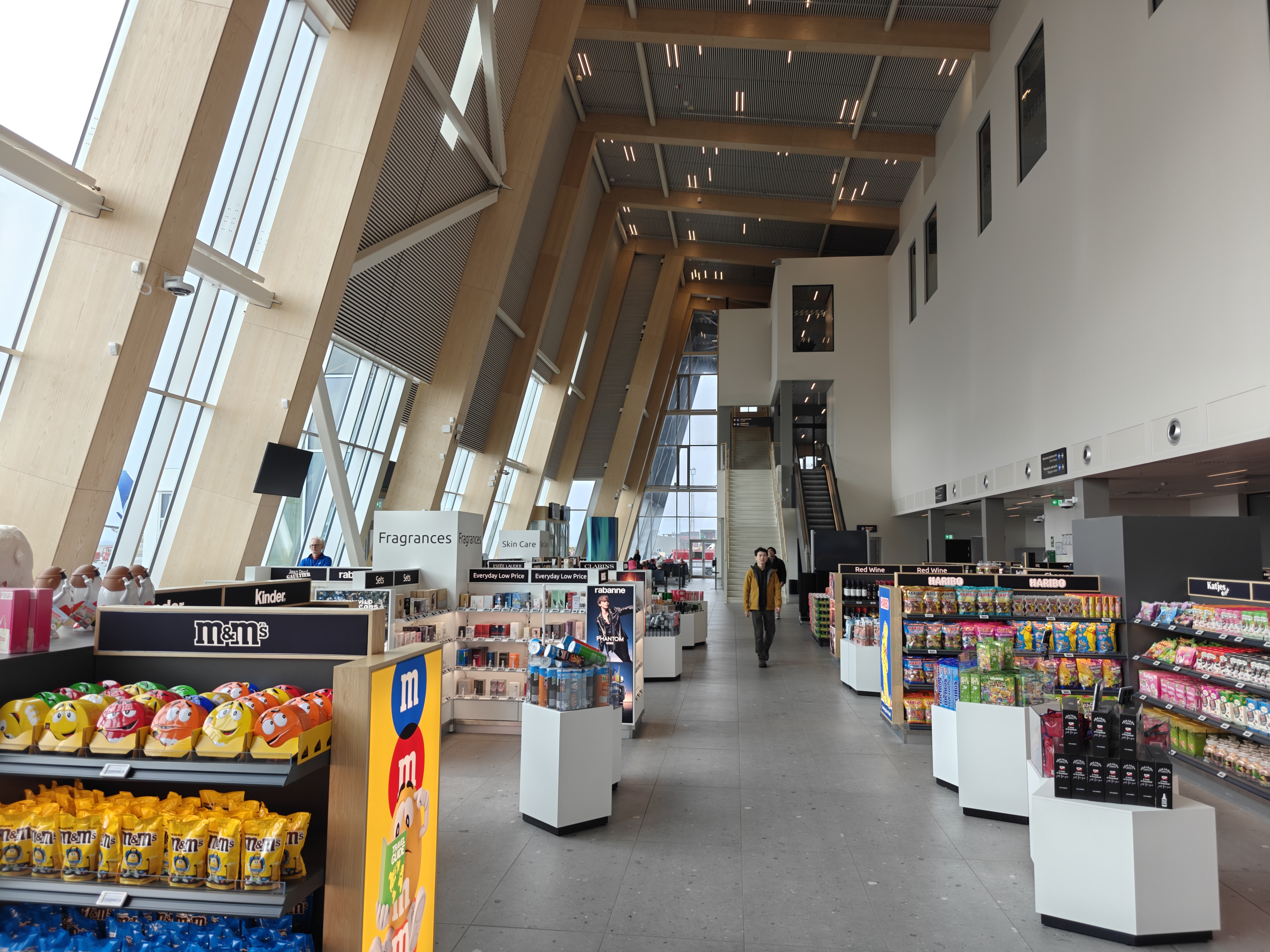
Inside the new terminal

A decision was made to extend the runway to 2,200 m (7,200 ft), build a new terminal, expanded apron and service buildings in 2016. The state-owned company Kalaallit Airports A/S was formed, to manage the airport expansion. It would build or rebuild (extend) the airports in Nuuk, Ilulissat and Qaqortoq, and thereafter own them.

Construction began at Nuuk Airport in November 2019. The airport was kept operational during construction, with the southern part of the new runway being built first and opened in November 2022, with the same declared length of 950 metres. Subsequently, the old runway was then removed and the rest of the new runway was then constructed, while the southern section was still operational. The new runway overlaps the old runway.

The new terminal building and accompanying apron was opened in summer 2024, which introduced security checks for the first time ever at Nuuk Airport. Subsequently, the old terminal and control tower were demolished in September 2024, as they were located too close for the new runway operations. The new control tower was commissioned in the same month. The only parts of the existing airport that exist after the expansion are Air Greenland's maintenance hangars, the airport's old service building and the original apron. The original runway was removed, rebuilt and extended.

=== Rebuilt airport opening ===
Air Greenland Dash 8-200 in Nuuk

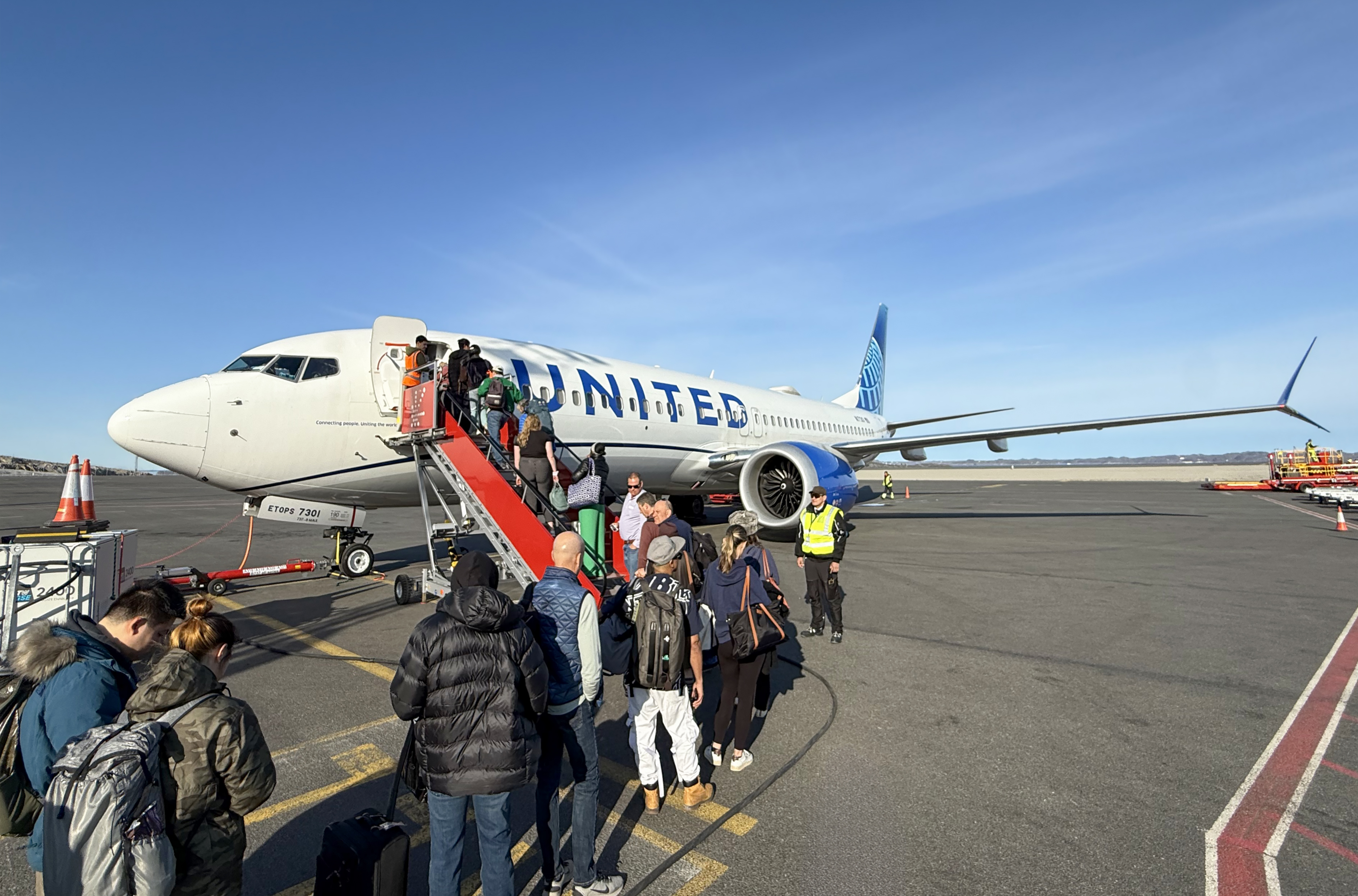
United Airlines 737 MAX 8 in Nuuk

The rebuilt runway was opened on 28 November 2024, when operations on the full extended 2,200m runway began. Subsequently, Air Greenland transitioned its hub from Kangerlussuaq Airport to Nuuk, along with its Copenhagen route operated using its Airbus A330-800. Domestic routes to Kangerlussuaq Airport were cut considerably with the transition of the hub.

==== New routes ====
Air Greenland began operating additional routes in 2025 using leased Boeing 737 aircraft to Billund and Aalborg as well as an additional flight to Copenhagen via Kangerlussaq in cooperation with a local travel agency. The route to from Nuuk to Billund Airport has a stopover at Keflavík International Airport, expanding Air Greenland's capacity to Iceland. The Billund route was dropped in 2026.

Icelandair has also increased service to Reykjavík-Keflavík International Airport with larger aircraft, initially using De Havilland Canada Dash 8-400 and serving Nuuk with Boeing 737 MAX 8 aircraft in summer 2025.

In October 2024, United Airlines announced a new direct flight from Newark to Nuuk operating twice weekly, beginning on 14 June 2025. Also in October, Scandinavian Airlines (SAS) announced a new route from Copenhagen to Nuuk for the summer 2025 season, operating three flights per week. SAS last served Greenland (to Kangerlussuaq) in 2009. SAS later dropped their route in 2026.

==== Initial operational difficulties ====
In the first months of operation, Nuuk Airport encountered several operational difficulties. Prior to the new runway opening, Nuuk Airport was revoked security certification by the Danish Civil Aviation and Railway Authority at the new terminal on 14 August 2024, meaning no international flights could be operated from the airport and passengers had to reroute and clear security at Kangerlussuaq or Kulusuk. At the time this only affected the limited international flights to Iqaluit, Canada and Keflavík, Iceland. This was rectified two months later on 14 October 2024, prior to opening of the new runway.

At the time of opening, a limited approval was granted only for Air Greenland and Icelandair to operate commercial flights. ILS approaches were not operational and increased safety requirements including runway friction restrictions were in place.

Full security approval was not approved at the time of opening, meaning passengers from Nuuk transferring in Copenhagen or Keflavík must undergo a second security check. In January 2025, the Danish Civil Aviation and Railway Authority revoked the approval of cargo operations at Nuuk airport due to operational deficiencies, but were reinstated a few days later.

Adverse weather conditions affecting runway friction minimums led to numerous cancellations of transatlantic Air Greenland flights in December 2024, January 2025 and in the summer. Kangerlussuaq Airport was temporarily reactivated as a hub on at least three occasions in 2025.

During the summer of 2025, there were numerous cancellations and delays, mainly due to security staffing issues and high absenteeism due to understaffing and some staff being unavailable due to the reindeer hunting season starting. Air Greenland reported that there were 59 cancellations in the first half of 2025, compared to three during the same period the year before, when Kangerlussuaq Airport was the hub.

Nuuk Airport was again revoked security certification by the Danish Civil Aviation and Railway Authority on 26 August 2025. This was rectified two days later with security staff being flown in from Denmark. The cancellations and repeated failures at Nuuk Airport caused public controversy and the Greenlandic government replaced four board members of Greenland Airports.

== Facilities ==
Nuuk Airport has a passenger terminal and a cargo terminal operated by Air Greenland. It serves as the hub and technical base for Air Greenland. Navigational aids serving the airport include ILS, GH NDB, LOC instrument approach and distance measuring equipment.

The terminal has four gates, separated for Schengen/Non-Schengen areas and passport control facilities. There are self check-in desks, security control, passport control (for non-Schengen flights), a duty-free store, a café and a seating area in the terminal.

== Airlines and destinations ==
The following airlines operate regular scheduled and charter flights to and from Nuuk:

Airlines	Destinations
Air Greenland	Aasiaat, Copenhagen, Ilulissat, Kangerlussuaq, Kulusuk, Maniitsoq, Paamiut, Qaqortoq, Sisimiut; Seasonal: Aalborg, Iqaluit
Icelandair	Reykjavík–Keflavík
United Airlines	Seasonal: Newark

== Ground transport ==
The airport is connected by road to Nuuk from two routes: one heading around the south end of the runway, and the other following the north end of the runway. There are both short-term and long-term parking for private cars available at the terminal. Taxis and tour operated buses are also available.

=== Bus ===
The Nuuk bus system is connected to the airport by Line 3. It connects the airport with Nuuk Centrum, passing through the Nuussuaq and Quassussuup Tungaa districts on the way. Buses depart from the airport every hour during rush hours Monday to Friday.

== Accidents and incidents ==
- In 1973 a Sikorsky S-61N helicopter operated by Grønlandsfly crashed in waters about 40 km (25 mi) south of Nuuk, due to possible main rotor failure. 15 people were killed, all on board, including passengers.
- On 7 June 2008, a Eurocopter AS350 operated by Air Greenland crashed on the runway at Nuuk Airport. There were no injuries, but the helicopter was damaged beyond repair.
- On 4 March 2011, an Air Iceland Dash 8's landing gear collapsed while landing on the runway. There were no injuries, but the aircraft suffered serious damage.
