= UAK =

UAK may refer to:

- Narsarsuaq Airport, in Narsarsuaq, Greenland, IATA airport code UAK
- Karbovanets, a former national currency of Ukraine, ISO 4217 currency code UAK
