= Kangerlussuaq Airport =

International airport in Greenland

Kangerlussuaq Airport Mittarfik Kangerlussuaq
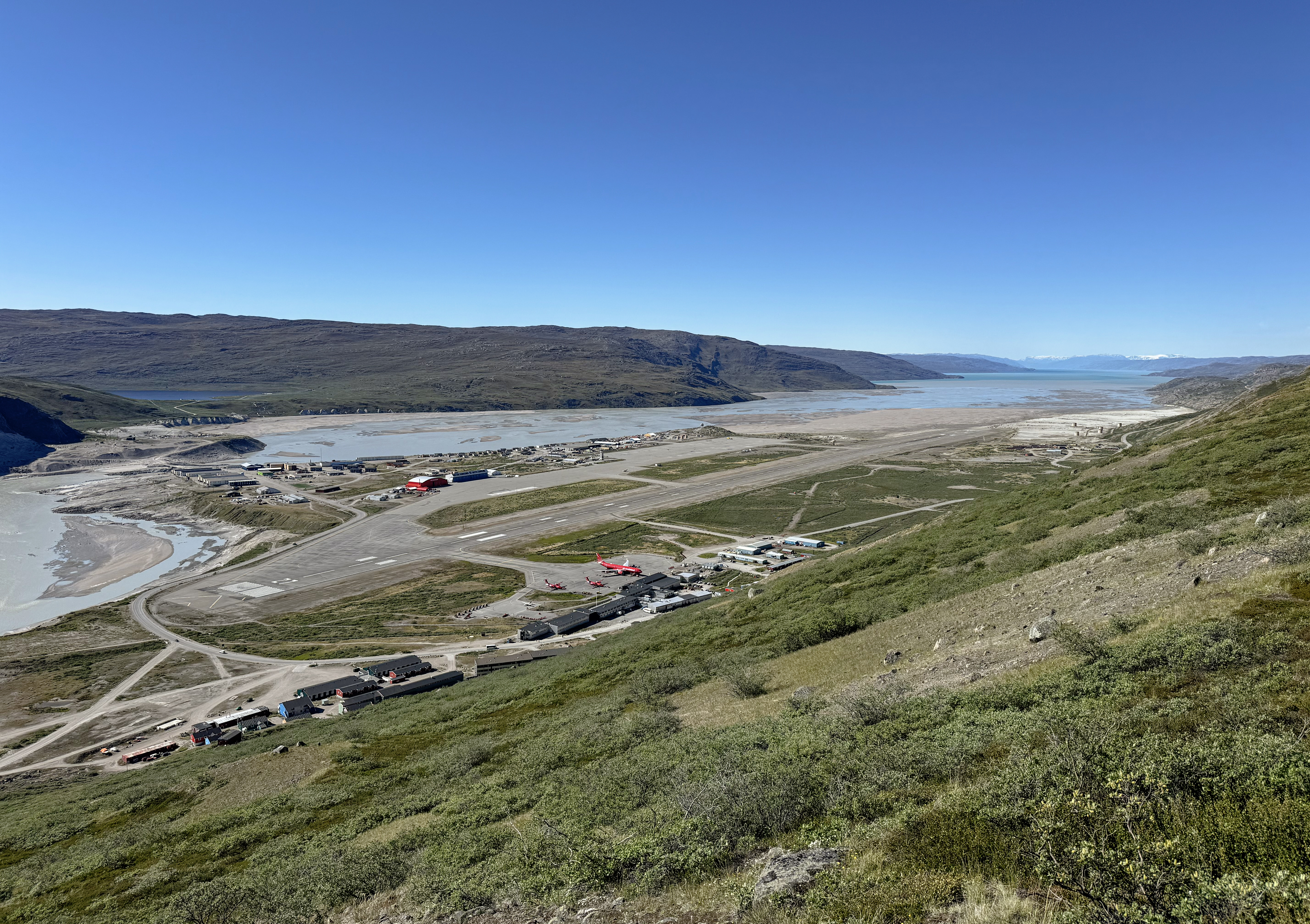
- Kangerlussuaq Airport in 2024
- IATA: SFJ; ICAO: BGSF

Summary
- Airport type: Public
- Operator: Greenland Airport Authority (Mittarfeqarfiit)
- Serves: Kangerlussuaq, Greenland
- Location: Kangerlussuaq, Qeqqata, Greenland, Denmark
- Elevation AMSL: 165 ft (50 m)
- Coordinates: 67°01′01″N 050°41′22″W
- Website: mit.gl

Map
- Location in Greenland

Runways
Direction	Length		Surface
Direction	m	ft	Surface
09/27	2,810	9,219	Asphalt

Statistics (2012)
- Passengers: 133,381
- Aircraft movements: 4,826
- Source: Danish AIS; Statistics from airport.

Kangerlussuaq Airport (Greenlandic: Mittarfik Kangerlussuaq, Danish: Kangerlussuaq Lufthavn, formerly Søndre Strømfjord Lufthavn in Danish; IATA: SFJ, ICAO: BGSF) is an airport in Kangerlussuaq, a settlement in the Qeqqata municipality in central-western Greenland. It was originally built as Sondrestrom Air Base (Bluie West-8) in 1941. It also began to serve a civilian role in the 1950s, which continued after the closure of the base in 1992. It is one of only three civilian airports in Greenland large enough to handle large aircraft, along with Nuuk Airport and Narsarsuaq Airport. It is still used for NATO and Danish Defence purposes.

Kangerlussuaq Airport was the international hub for Air Greenland until most traffic transitioned to Nuuk Airport in November 2024, when its new terminal and lengthened runway opened.

== History ==
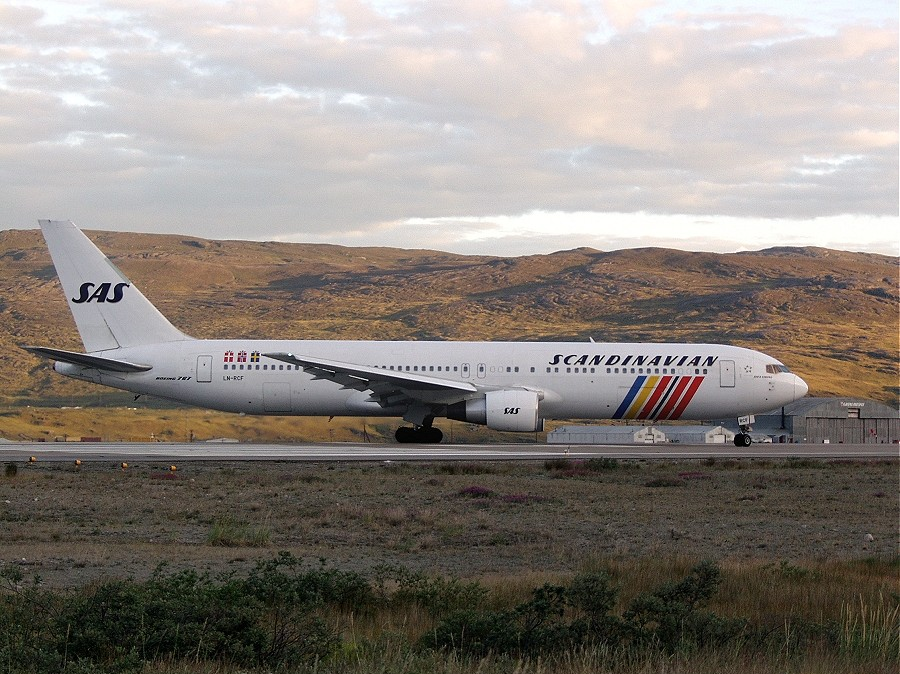
A Scandinavian Airlines Boeing 767-300ER in Kangerlussuaq in 2001

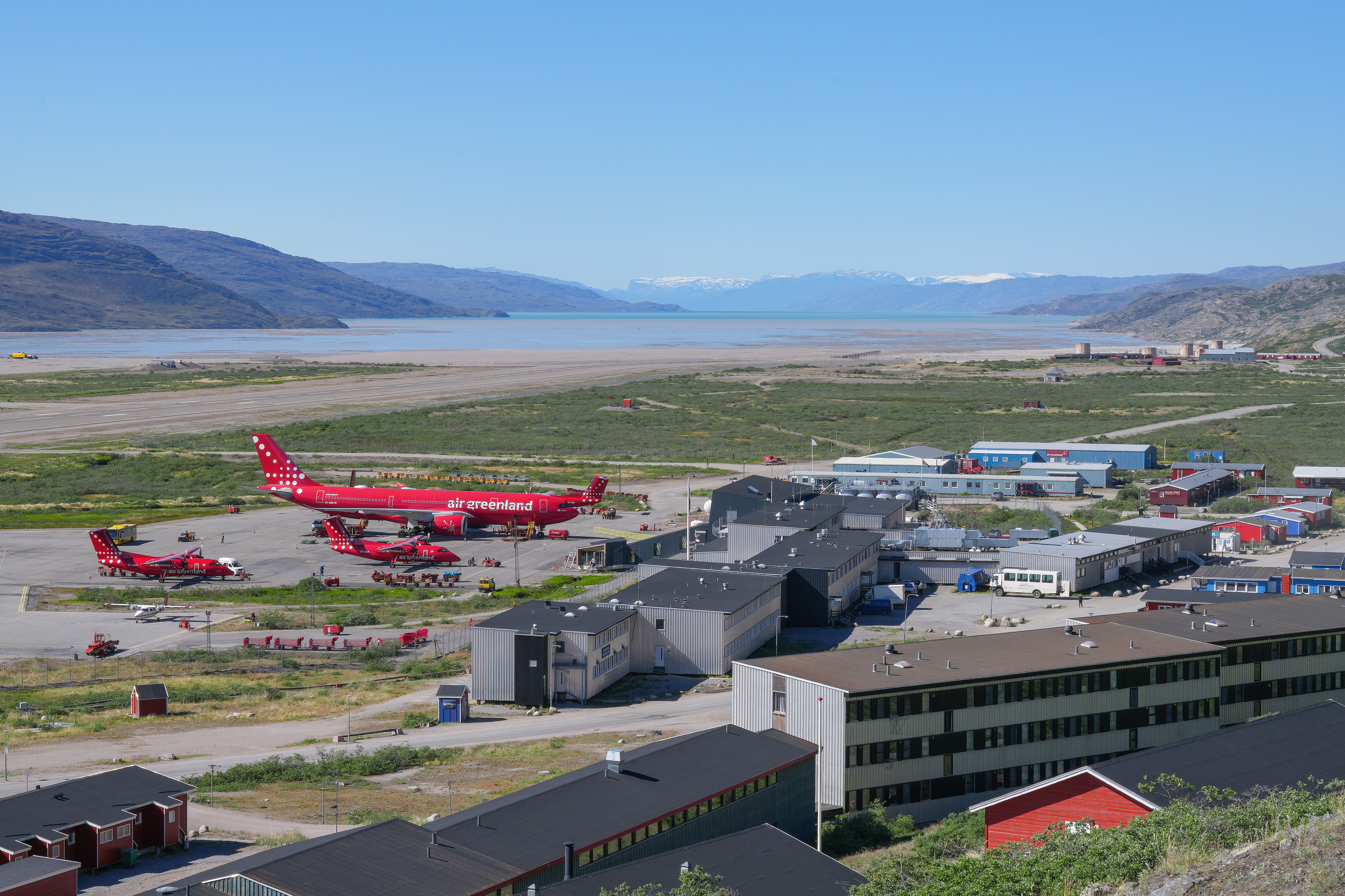
The airport facilities in 2024

=== Foundation and early years ===
The first airport was built here during the US occupation in 1941 under the name of Bluie West-8, and later renamed Sondrestromfjord Air Base and Sondrestrom Air Base. The airport is located away from the coast and hence less prone to fog and wind than other airports in Greenland.

In the mid-1950s, transatlantic civilian flights began using the air base for refuelling. In 1956, Scandinavian Airlines (SAS) was flying "Polar route" service with three round trip flights per week being operated with Douglas DC-6B propliners on a routing of Copenhagen - Sondre Stromfjord (now Kangerlussuaq) - Winnipeg - Los Angeles. This use enabled air travel to Greenland, but fell off in the 1960s as airliners gained greater range. Instead, the base became the hub of Greenland air traffic. The airport was handed over to civilian Greenlandic control under Greenland Airports in 1992.

=== Development during the 2000s ===
Air Greenland introduced seasonal flights to Baltimore in May 2007. The following March, it decided to end the route.

In the past there have been tourist charter flights between Germany and Kangerlussuaq in summer, in connection with cruise ship arrivals to the Kangerlussuaq seaport. Those flights have typically been operated by Air Greenland or airlines from Germany. Other charter flights have also been operated, for example a number of flights from the US and Canada landed in connection with the 2016 Arctic Winter Games in Nuuk and a flight to Canada in connection with the 2023 Arctic Winter Games. Access to several research camps on the Greenland ice sheet, including the Danish field camp North GRIP and the American Summit Camp, have been handled through Kangerlussuaq via the 109th Airlift Wing of the New York Air National Guard.

At a late 2011 Air Greenland meeting, plans to move the main Greenland intercontinental air hub away from Kangerlussuaq were agreed upon. According to the 2011 plan, three 1,199-metre (3,934 ft) airstrips will be built: a new airport at Qaqortoq, as well as extensions at Nuuk and Ilulissat. New airports will probably also be built at Tasiilaq and Ittoqqortoormiit later. Alongside Kangerlussuaq, the airports at Narsarsuaq and Kulusuk (if Tasiilaq is built) will also be closed. Generally, a number of the airstrips have been built by the US military at locations deliberately away from major settlements, partly due to the Danish policy to downplay the presence of the US military in Greenland. There was also a concern for the need to renovate the Kangerlussuaq runway for a fairly high cost, as the permafrost is melting underneath it.

A decision was made in 2016 to extend the runways of both Nuuk and Ilulissat airports to 2,200 m (7,218 ft), allowing them to receive medium size jetliners from Denmark, and also to replace Narsarsuaq with a new airport at Qaqortoq. Construction at Nuuk Airport started late 2019. Due to the runway stability problems at Kangerlussuaq, it was initially thought that this would eventually lead to the closure or restricted use of its runway. However, in 2024 it was clarified that Kangerlussuaq Airport would remain open and there will continue to be unrestricted access for larger civilian aircraft.

Even though most international traffic will move to Nuuk and Ilulissat, Kangerlussuaq will remain important, partly due to its more stable weather and longer runway. Cruise ships want to exchange passengers at Greenland because the long journey time to Greenland and back to home is unsuitable for many passengers. They need a reliable airport with few delays because cruise ships have firm planned schedules with booked ports and land activities. For this reason, in 2018 plans were approved to build a better port near Kangerlussuaq together with a 15 km (9.3 mi) road to the airport. As of 2018, the small port cannot take cruise ships nor large freight ships, so transfer boats are needed.

During its status as the Air Greenland international hub, most air freight including mail, goods and fresh food passed through Kangerlussuaq Airport. Because of the lack of a good port at Kangerlussuaq, most material was transported by air to other destinations. Goods that did not need such quick transport were often freighted by air to Nuuk and then by ship to other places in Greenland. A road to Sisimiut at the coast was planned with this freight in mind. Amenities which were previously present at the airport were a nightclub and a self-service bar open in the daytime. Several tourism outfitters shared an office in the terminal. There are also other more simple accommodations in Kangerlussuaq.

=== Air Greenland hub closure ===
On 27 November 2024, the last regular scheduled Air Greenland service to Copenhagen using their flagship Airbus A330-800 departed the airport. This marked the end of Kangerlussuaq Airport as the hub for Air Greenland's international network, which transitioned to Nuuk Airport following its expansion.

Kangerlussuaq Airport remains a minor international airport and is served by seasonal flights to Copenhagen as a stopover using leased aircraft. Following the loss of its hub status in November 2024, flights from Kangerlussuaq to Aasiaat, Maniitsoq and Narsarsuaq were discontinued, whilst the frequency of flights to Nuuk, Ilulissat and Sisimiut was reduced.

As a result of weather and security related problems at Nuuk Airport, Kangerlussuaq Airport was temporarily reactivated as a hub on at least three occasions in 2025.

== Facilities ==
A passenger terminal accommodates international and domestic flights. Hotel Kangerlussuaq, with 70 rooms and a restaurant, is located within the terminal building of the airport, providing accommodation for visitors to the area. A tourist office is also located in the terminal.

== Airlines and destinations ==
The following airlines operate regular scheduled flights at Kangerlussuaq Airport:

Airlines	Destinations
Air Greenland	Nuuk, Sisimiut; Seasonal: Ilulissat, Copenhagen

== Accidents and incidents ==
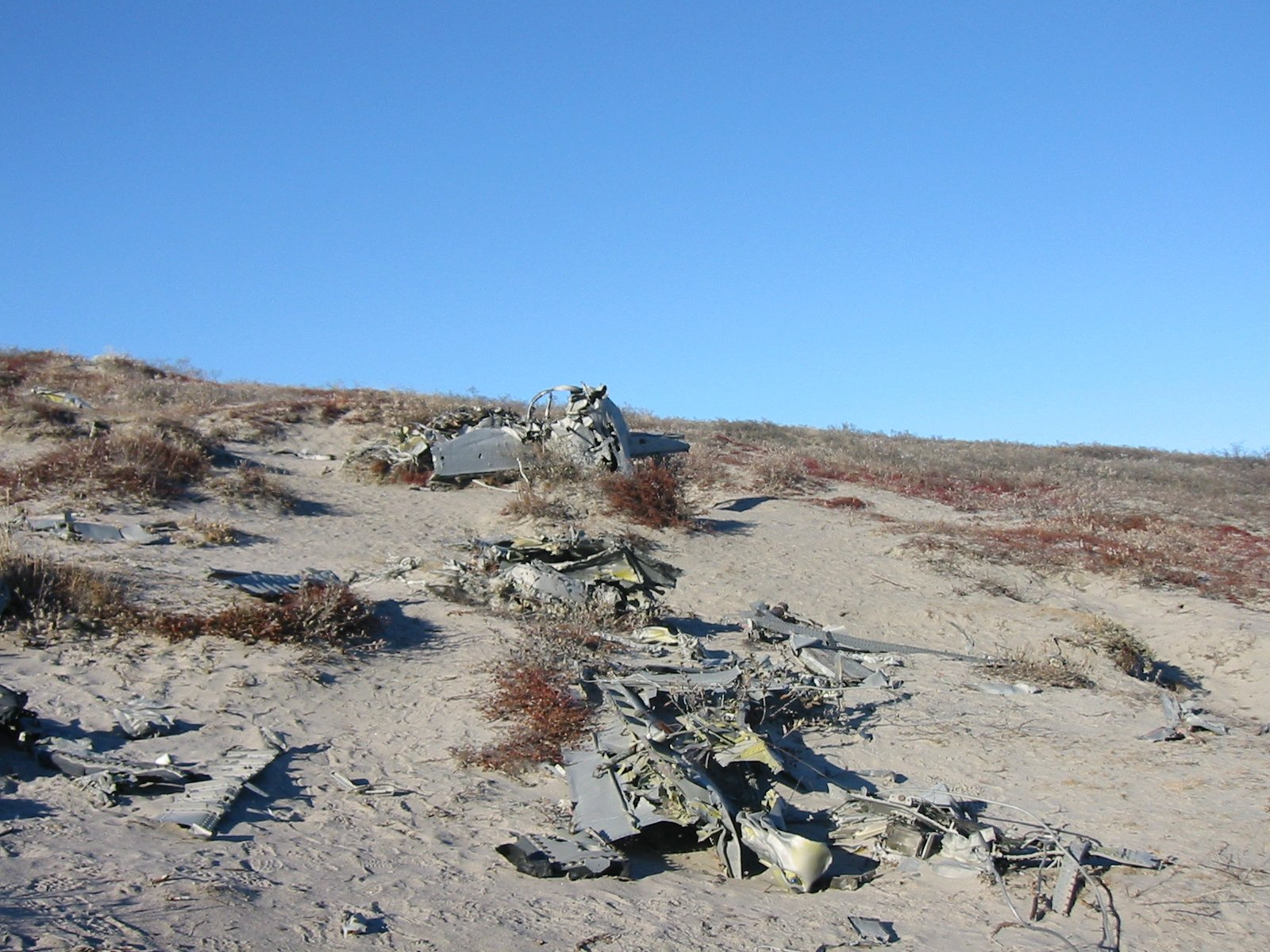
Wreckage of a Lockheed T-33 from the 1968 accident still visible (2007)

- In 1961, a DHC-3 Otter, operated by Greenlandair, crashed at emergency landing in terrain near Kangerlussuaq, because of a fire on board. One crew member was killed. There were two crew and four passengers on board.
- In 1968, three US Lockheed T-33 jet trainers collided and crashed into a nearby mountain. All three pilots parachuted to safety. Debris is located 15.22 km from the airport off dirt road at 67° 03′ 46.4″ N, 50° 23′ 08.5″ W
- In 1976, a US Air Force C-141A cargo plane crashed, killing 23 of 27 passengers and crew on board.

== See also ==
- List of airports in Greenland
- List of the busiest airports in the Nordic countries
