= Qaqortoq Heliport =

Heliport in Greenland

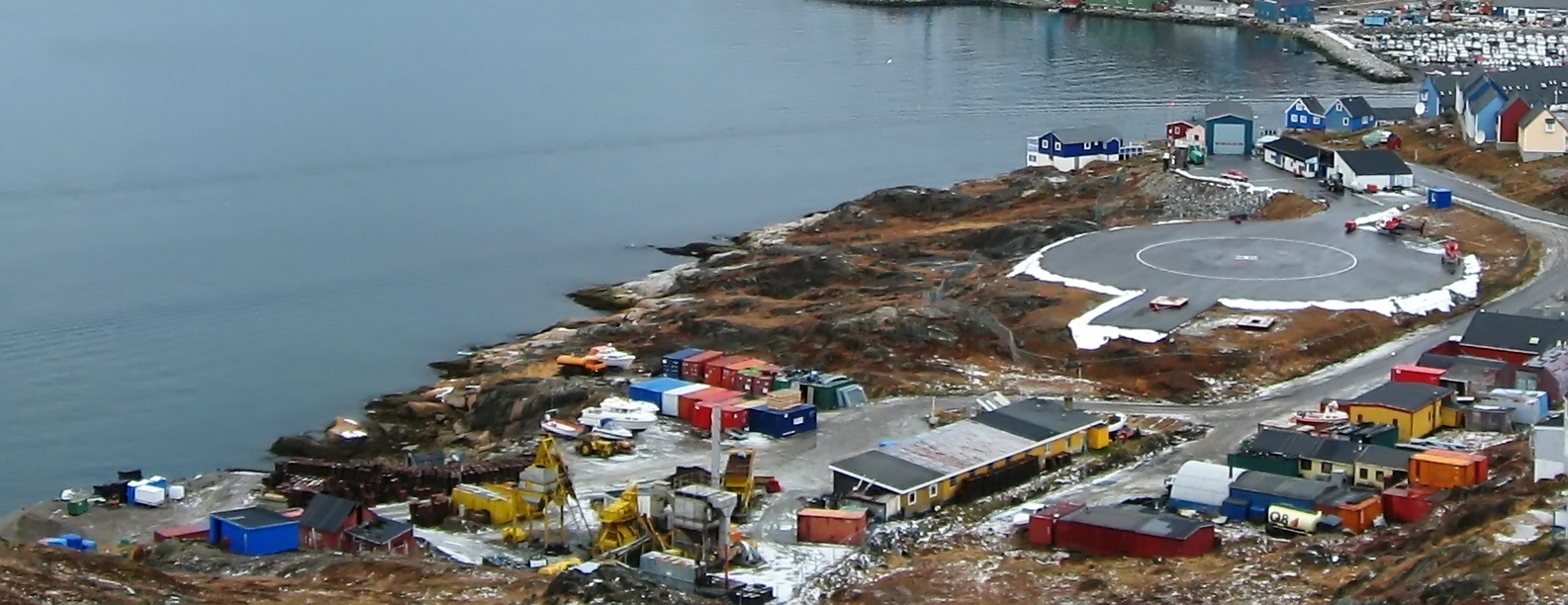
- IATA: JJU; ICAO: BGJH

Summary
- Airport type: Public
- Operator: Greenland Airport Authority (Mittarfeqarfiit)
- Serves: Qaqortoq, Greenland
- Closed: 16 April 2026
- Elevation AMSL: 53 ft / 16 m
- Coordinates: 60°42′57″N 046°01′46″W
- Website: Qaqortoq Heliport

Map
- Location in Greenland

Helipads
Number	Length		Surface
Number	m	ft	Surface
1	11.5 (radius)	38 (radius)	Asphalt

Statistics (2012)
- Passengers: 14,204
- Aircraft movements: 1,897
- Source: Danish AIS; Statistics from airport

Qaqortoq Heliport (IATA: JJU, ICAO: BGJH) was a heliport in the southern part of Qaqortoq, a town in the Kujalleq municipality in southern Greenland. The heliport and fixed-wing flights from Narsarsuaq Airport were replaced by Qaqortoq Airport, which opened in April 2026.

== History ==
Qaqortoq heliport opened in the late 1960s as Air Greenland began using Sikorsky S-61 helicopters to provide service on Greenland's west coast. Passengers were generally transferred by helicopter to Narsarsuaq Airport, 59 kilometres (37 mi) away, and continued their onward journey by fixed-wing aircraft. Qaqortoq Heliport also served as a helicopter hub for smaller towns in the region.

In December 2015 the Greenland government decided to construct Qaqortoq Airport, to be used for fixed-wing aircraft. It is located around 5 km north of the town of Qaqortoq with a 1,500-metre (4,921 ft) runway. The new airport opened on the 16 April 2026 and replaced, in operation, Qaqortoq heliport and Narsarsuaq Airport. The airport assumed the heilport's IATA code of JJU, but has a separate new ICAO code of BGQO. Qaqortoq Heliport was subsequently closed.
