= Qaqortoq Airport =

Qaqortoq Airport Mittarfik Qaqortoq
- IATA: JJU; ICAO: BGQO

Summary
- Airport type: Public
- Operator: Greenland Airports
- Serves: Qaqortoq, Greenland
- Opened: 16 April 2026
- Coordinates: 60°45′57″N 046°03′54″W

Map
- Location in Greenland

Runways
Direction	Length		Surface
Direction	m	ft	Surface
11/29	1,500	4,921	Asphalt

Qaqortoq Airport (Greenlandic: Mittarfik Qaqortoq; IATA: JJU, ICAO: BGQO) is an airport near Qaqortoq, the largest town in southern Greenland. It serves fixed-wing services in southern Greenland, as well as helicopter flights to smaller towns in the region.

The airport opened on 16 April 2026 replacing, in operation, Qaqortoq Heliport and Narsarsuaq Airport. The wider network of air traffic in southern Greenland was previously served by Narsarsuaq Airport, a former U.S. military base, which is about 60 km from Qaqortoq.

== History ==
Many feasibility assessments regarding building a landing strip near Qaqortoq for fixed-wing aircraft had been conducted throughout the 2000s and 2010s. The issue was previously debated in 2007, when the Democrats opposed a Siumut landing strip proposal, citing ecological and environmental concerns. In contrast to the previous debates, presently the Democrats are lobbying for a 1,799-meter (5,902 ft) runway, making passenger flights to continental Europe possible. A shorter, 1,199-meter (3,934 ft) runway, supported by the CEO of Air Greenland, would enable flights with small turboprops to Iceland and eastern Canada. The cost of moving the airport from Narsarsuaq as a 1799-metre runway was estimated at DKK900 million (€120.7m), while a 1199-metre runway was estimated at DKK370 million (€50m). At the time, Narsarsuaq airport was a community of 140 people, depending solely on the airport, but the Kujalleq Municipality supports the plans for moving the airport to the centre of South Greenland, thereby creating economic growth in the region.

Five locations for a possible airport were assessed. Four of these – at Prinsessen, Nunarsuatsiaap Kujalequtaa, Munkebugten, and halfway towards Narsaq – are for a 1,199-meter (3,934 ft) domestic runway. Only one location, northwest of the town between Nuupiluk and Matup Tunua, would be suitable for a runway up to 2,100 meters (6,900 ft), in order to accommodate intercontinental flights. In 2011 its was expected that a new airport would be built before 2020, likely with a 1,499-metre runway behind the mountain of Saqqaarsik, being able to serve flights from Europe, Iceland and other parts of Greenland, thereby moving the air transport centre of South Greenland from Narsarsuaq to the centre of the region.

=== Decision ===
The final political decision on the matter was then pending for years, but an act on the project was finalised by the parliament of Greenland in 2018, and a project began being prepared for an airport with a 1500-metre runway, allowing smaller jets to land during the crucial summer tourist season. The 1500-metre runway is important for developing the nearby Tanbreez REE-mine project.

The decided site for the airport is located at 60°45′51″N 46°3′57″W, 5 km north of Qaqortoq and a runway length of 1500 metres.

The 1500 metre runway was considered the shortest possibility, in terms of future economic development, especially within the tourism sector. This length allows propeller aircraft of near 100 seats (such as DHC-8-Q400) to fly all seats used domestically and to Iceland. There is room for an extension of up to 1,800 metres (5,906 ft), which would allow for larger jet aircraft to use the airport.

=== Construction and opening ===
The access road to the airport site was completed as a gravel road in 2017, later upgraded to an asphalt road. The first rock blasting at the airport site were conducted at a ceremony during early November 2016. A large setback occurred in April 2020 when the procurement of the airport construction was halted because all offers were well above the project budget. A contract with a construction company from Canada was finally signed in February 2022.

In October 2025, Air Greenland commenced sales of flights to Qaqortoq Airport. In the same month, Icelandair announced summer seasonal flights to Qaqortoq operated by a De Havilland Canada Dash 8-400, commencing on 2 June 2026 and replacing their route to Narsarsuaq.

In November 2025, Greenland Airports announced that Qaqortoq Airport will commence operations on 16 April 2026. Qaqortoq assumed the previous heilport's IATA code of JJU, but was assigned a new ICAO code of BGQO.

The airport opened on 16 April 2026 and all fixed-wing flights and regional helicopter services for the region began operating from there. Following the opening of Qaqortoq Airport, Narsarsuaq Airport was downgraded to a heliport and Qaqortoq Heliport was closed.

== Airlines and destinations ==
Airlines	Destinations
Air Greenland	Nanortalik, Narsaq, Narsarsuaq, Nuuk; Seasonal: Alluitsup Paa, Ammassivik, Paamiut
Icelandair	Seasonal: Reykjavík–Keflavík

== See also ==
- Qaqortoq heliport
- Narsarsuaq Airport
- Air Greenland
