= Paamiut Airport =

Airport near Paamiut, Greenland

Paamiut Airport Mittarfik Paamiut
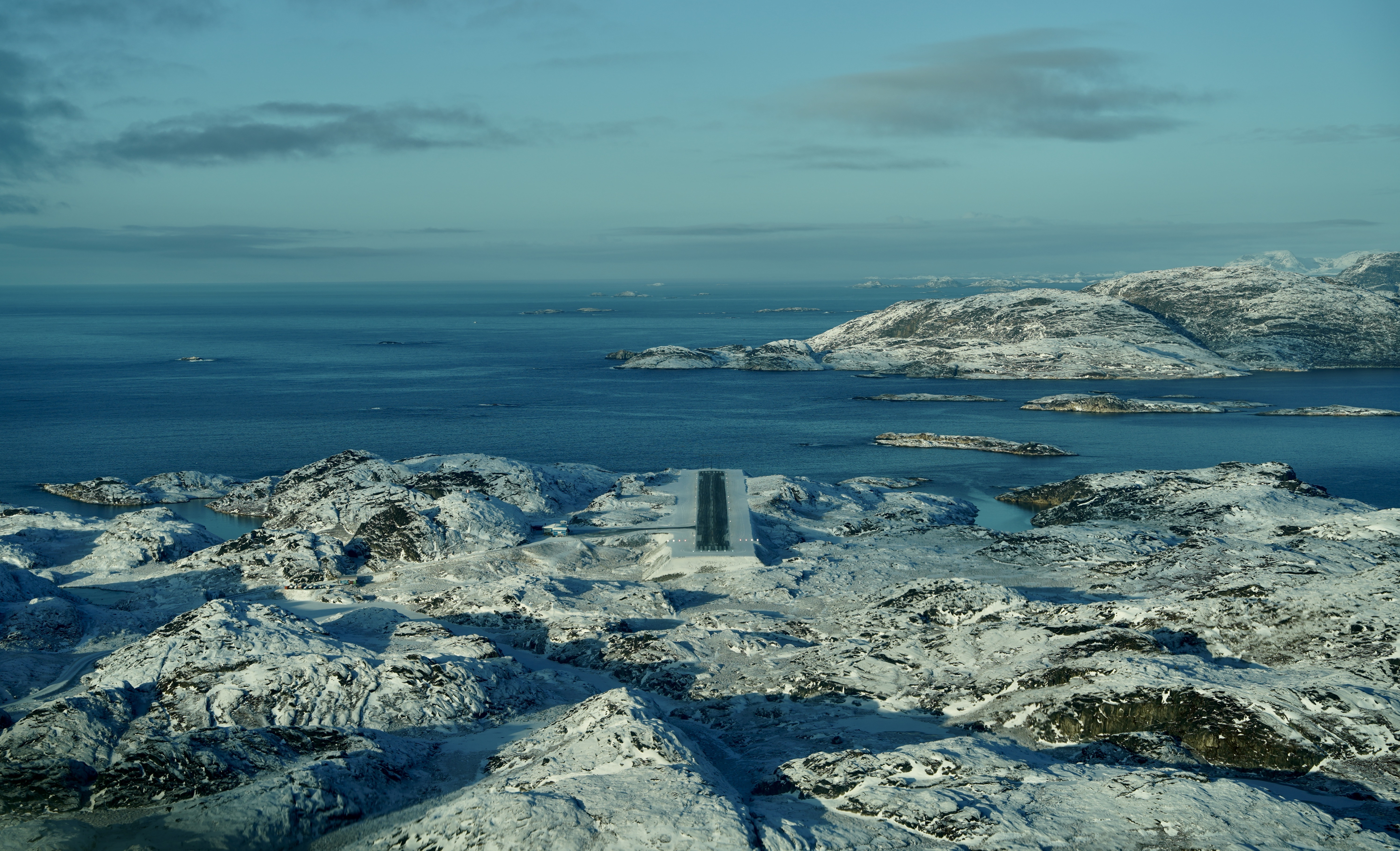
- IATA: JFR; ICAO: BGPT

Summary
- Airport type: Public
- Operator: Greenland Airport Authority (Mittarfeqarfiit)
- Serves: Paamiut, Greenland
- Opened: 1 December 2007
- Elevation AMSL: 120 ft (37 m)
- Coordinates: 62°00′53″N 049°40′15″W
- Website: Paamiut Lufthavne

Map
- Location in Greenland

Runways
Direction	Length		Surface
Direction	m	ft	Surface
17/35	799	2,621	Asphalt

Statistics (2012)
- Passengers: 4,249
- Source: Danish AIS

Paamiut Airport (Greenlandic: Mittarfik Paamiut) (IATA: JFR, ICAO: BGPT) is an airport 1 NM (1.9 km; 1.2 mi) northeast of Paamiut, a town in the Sermersooq municipality in southwestern Greenland. It was opened on 1 December 2007. It replaced an older heliport which was at 61.992472°N 49.661238°W. It is the only airport between Nuuk and Qaqortoq capable of serving STOL aircraft of Air Greenland.

== Airlines and destinations ==
Airlines	Destinations
Air Greenland	Nuuk, Qaqortoq
