= Paamiut =

Town in Greenland

Paamiut Frederikshåb
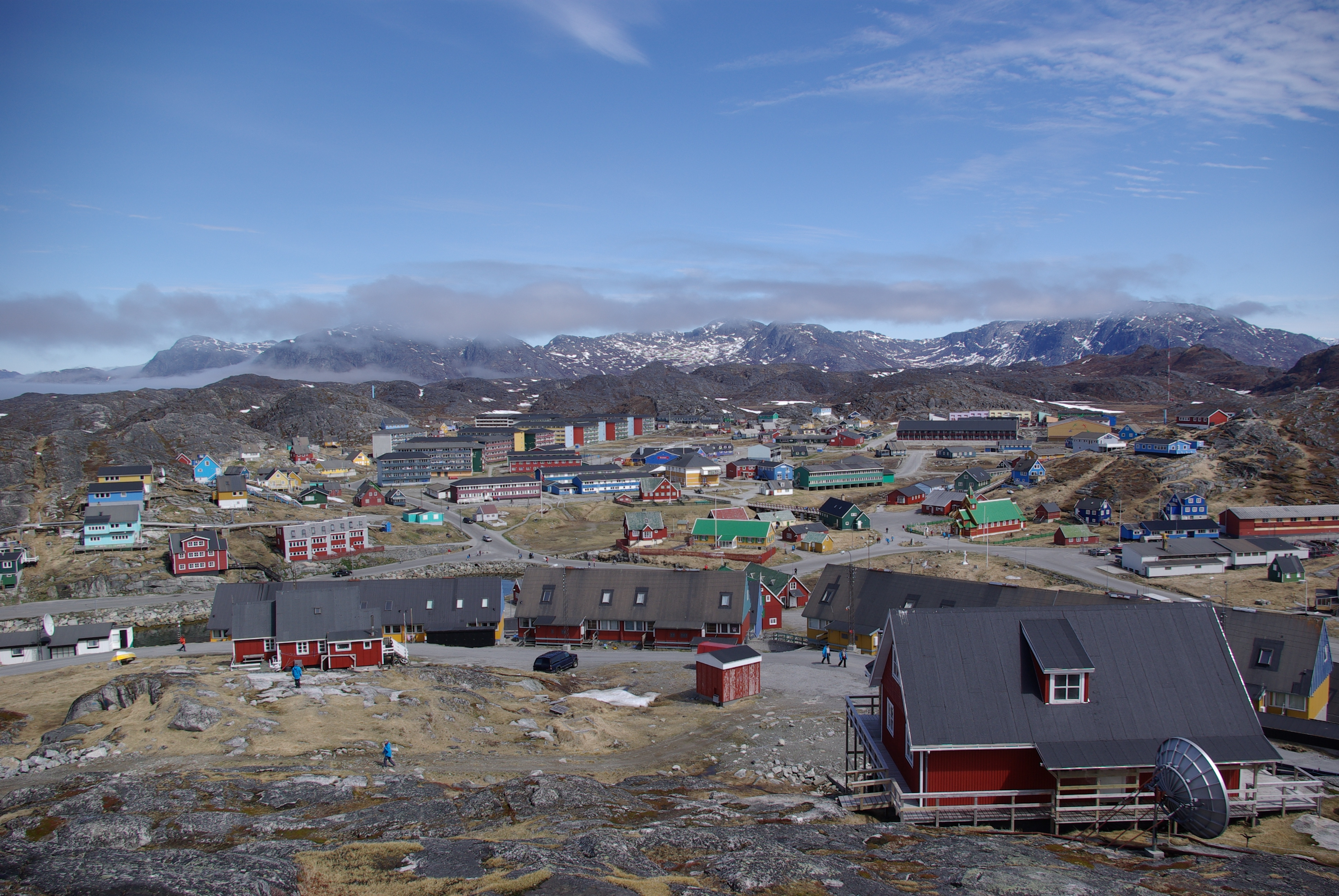
- Central Paamiut in early-June 2011

- Location within Greenland
- Coordinates: 61°59′40″N 49°40′00″W
- State: Kingdom of Denmark
- Constituent country: Greenland
- Municipality: Sermersooq
- First settled: 1500 BC
- Founded: 1742

Population (2020)
  - Total: 1,308
- Time zone: UTC−02:00 (Western Greenland Time)
  - Summer (DST): UTC−01:00 (Western Greenland Summer Time)
- Postal code: 3940
- Website: http://www.paamiut.gl/ (live c. 2000–2007); https://visitgreenland.com/destinations/paamiut/ (live since at least 2020)

Paamiut, also known as Frederikshåb, is a town in southwestern Greenland in the Sermersooq municipality.

== Geography ==
Paamiut is located on the coast of Labrador Sea in the southern end of a small estuary called Kuannersooq ("Inlet").

== History ==
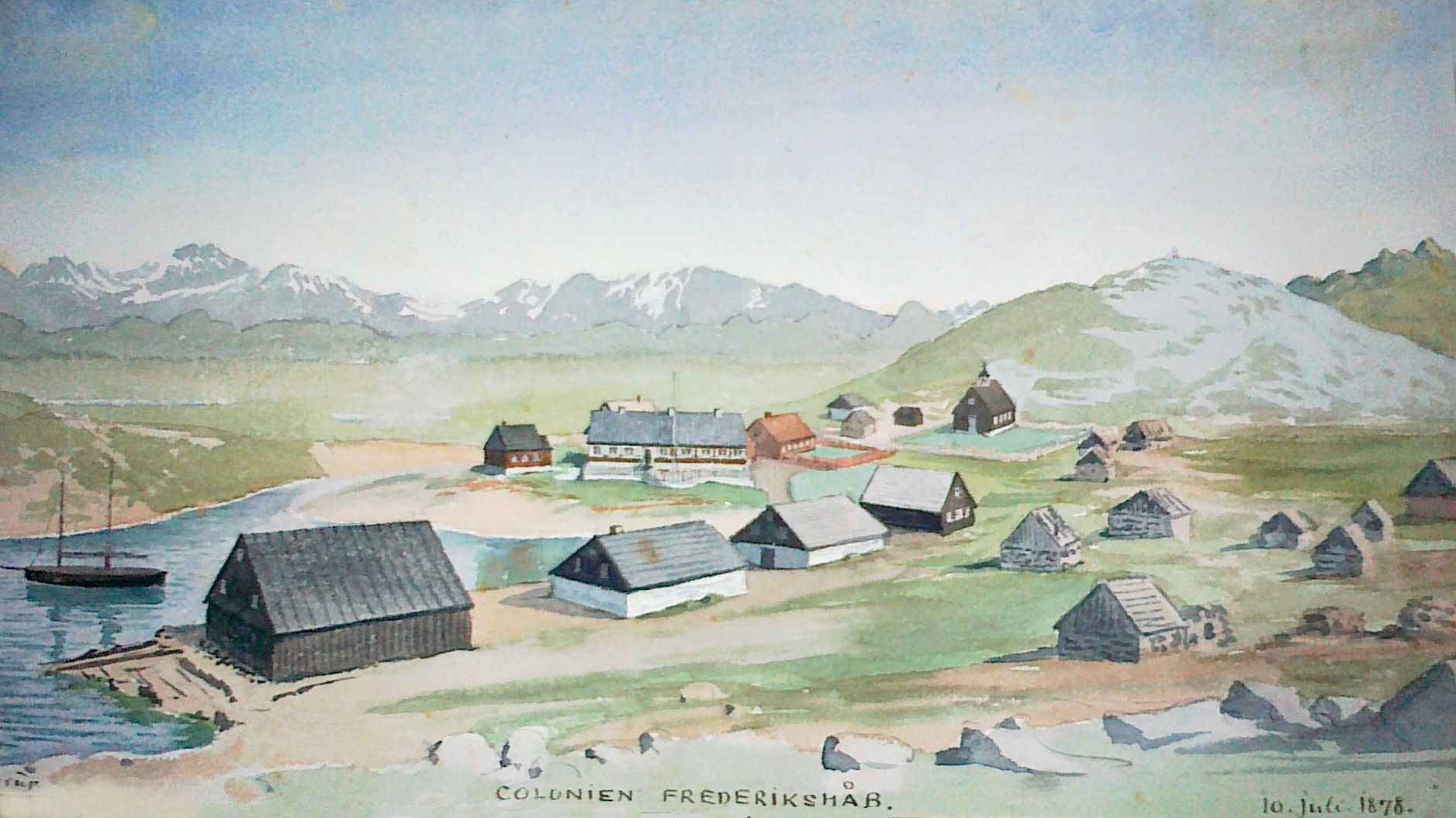
Frederikshåb in 1878

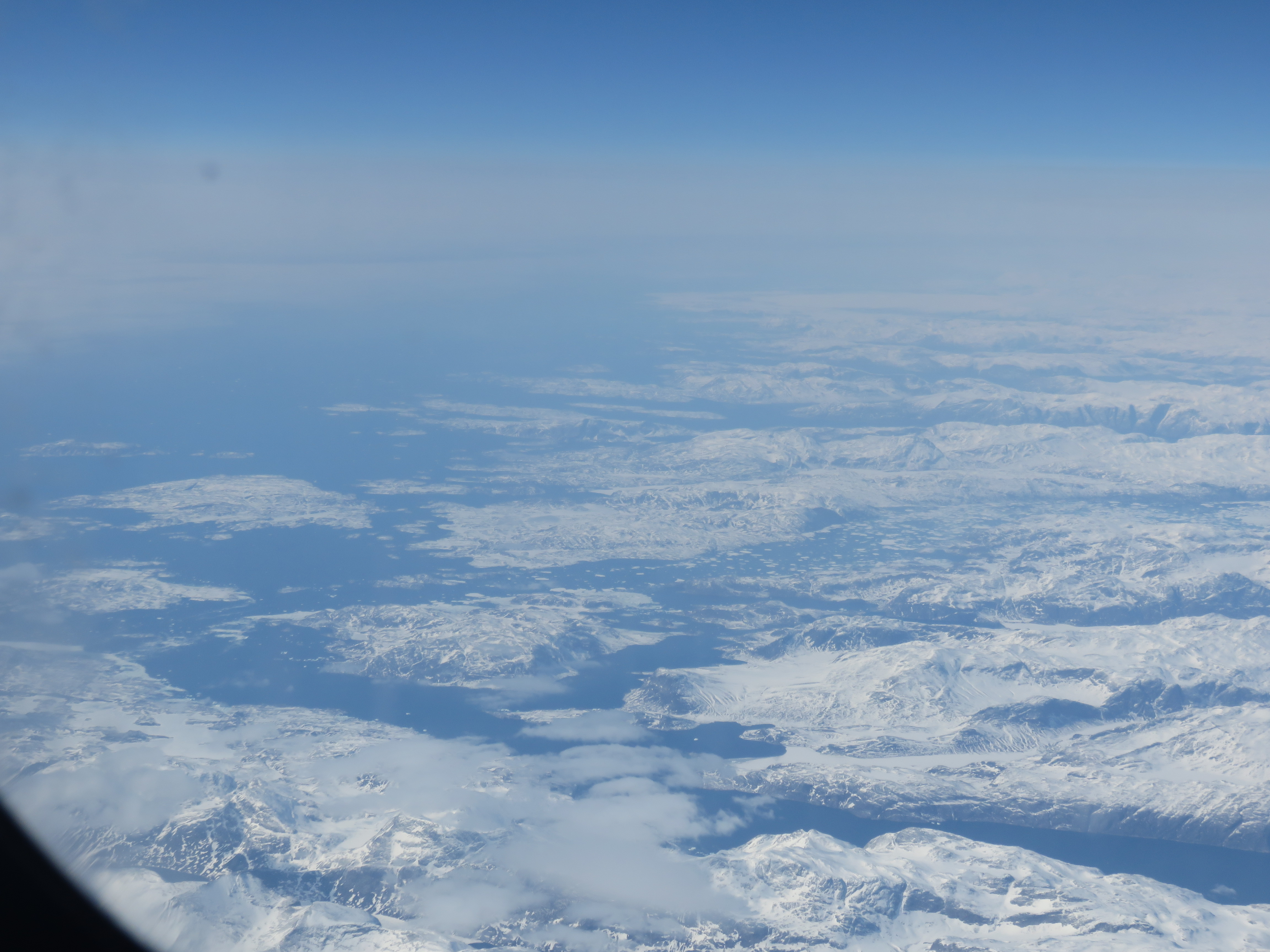
Aerial view of the vicinity of Paamiut

People have lived in the Paamiut area since around 1500 BC. The name Paamiut is Kalaallisut for "Those who Reside by the Mouth (of the fiord)".

The trading post of Frederikshaab (sometimes anglicized as Frederick's Hope) was established by Jacob Severin's company in 1742 and named in honor of the Crown Prince Frederick (later King Frederick V of Denmark).

The community prospered on trading fur and whale products. It also became known for its soapstone artists. The town has one of the finest churches in Greenland, built in 1909 from wood in the Norwegian style.

Following the warming climatic trends since the 1920s, Paamiut developed a booming cod industry between the 1950s and 1989, when the stock dwindled. In connection with a development plan called G60, Paamiut was chosen as the place to live for the entire population of the former Paamiut municipality. Therefore, the number of people living there rose significantly during that period.

There is a local museum downtown in original buildings from the previous century, among them a carpenter workshop and a salt warehouse. The Danish Crown Princely family visited the town as part of an official tour of Greenland in summer 2014.

== Economy ==
As is the case for other towns of western Greenland, the sea is free of ice during the winter, while fishing is the primary occupation of the inhabitants of the region. Icebergs, coming adrift along the east coast of Greenland with the East Greenland Current and continuing up along the west coast with the West Greenland Current normally arrive in the autumn, bringing numerous seals marking this season as a great time for the local hunters.

== Population ==
With 1,308 inhabitants as of 2020, it is the tenth-largest town in Greenland, down from the seventh in 2005. Paamiut has been losing population for almost every year in the last two decades: more than 31% relative to 1990 levels, almost 20% relative to 2000, and more than 16% relative to 2005.

== Transport ==
Paamiut is a port of call for the Arctic Umiaq ferry service. In November 2007, the Paamiut Airport was built by Mittarfeqarfiit. Connections to Nuuk and Narsarsuaq are served by Air Greenland STOL aircraft.

== Climate ==
Like other coastal areas of Greenland, Paamiut has a typical tundra climate (Köppen climate classification ET), with cold winters and cool summers. The average annual high temperature is 2.2 °C (36.0 °F), while the average annual low temperature is −4.0 °C (24.8 °F). July has the highest average high at 8.8 °C (47.8 °F) and the highest average low at 2.8 °C (37.0 °F). January has the lowest average high at −3.4 °C (25.9 °F). February has the lowest average low at −10.2 °C (13.6 °F). The highest temperature recorded in Paamiut is 21.2 °C (70.2 °F) in July, and the lowest is −29.6 °C (−21.3 °F) in February.

Paamiut receives 878 millimetres (34.6 in) of precipitation over 119.9 precipitation days and 87.1 snowy days. Precipitation is evenly distributed throughout the year. August, the wettest month, receives 92 millimetres (3.6 in) of rainfall over 10 precipitation days, although other months have more precipitation days. January has the most snowy days with 12.7 snowy days.

Climate data for Paamiut (1991-2020, extremes 1958-2020)
Month	Jan	Feb	Mar	Apr	May	Jun	Jul	Aug	Sep	Oct	Nov	Dec	Year
Record high °C (°F)	12.9 (55.2)	16.0 (60.8)	22.7 (72.9)	24.8 (76.6)	20.9 (69.6)	23.6 (74.5)	22.7 (72.9)	22.5 (72.5)	20.8 (69.4)	18.5 (65.3)	16.3 (61.3)	14.5 (58.1)	24.8 (76.6)
Mean daily maximum °C (°F)	−3.4 (25.9)	−4.0 (24.8)	−2.3 (27.9)	1.9 (35.4)	4.7 (40.5)	7.7 (45.9)	9.4 (48.9)	9.0 (48.2)	7.1 (44.8)	3.9 (39.0)	0.2 (32.4)	−2.0 (28.4)	2.7 (36.8)
Daily mean °C (°F)	−6.4 (20.5)	−7.2 (19.0)	−5.7 (21.7)	−1.2 (29.8)	2.0 (35.6)	4.7 (40.5)	6.4 (43.5)	6.3 (43.3)	4.5 (40.1)	1.2 (34.2)	−2.7 (27.1)	−4.8 (23.4)	−0.2 (31.6)
Mean daily minimum °C (°F)	−9.8 (14.4)	−10.9 (12.4)	−9.3 (15.3)	−4.4 (24.1)	−0.5 (31.1)	2.2 (36.0)	3.9 (39.0)	3.9 (39.0)	2.0 (35.6)	−1.6 (29.1)	−6.0 (21.2)	−8.3 (17.1)	−3.2 (26.2)
Record low °C (°F)	−28.9 (−20.0)	−29.6 (−21.3)	−30.9 (−23.6)	−18.5 (−1.3)	−14.6 (5.7)	−4.0 (24.8)	−4.0 (24.8)	−2.2 (28.0)	−6.5 (20.3)	−14.1 (6.6)	−20.5 (−4.9)	−25.3 (−13.5)	−30.9 (−23.6)
Average precipitation mm (inches)	66 (2.6)	64 (2.5)	64 (2.5)	58 (2.3)	58 (2.3)	67 (2.6)	91 (3.6)	92 (3.6)	80 (3.1)	71 (2.8)	84 (3.3)	83 (3.3)	878 (34.5)
Average precipitation days (≥ 1.0 mm)	10.1	9.1	10.4	9.2	8.3	9.5	11.2	10.0	10.9	9.5	11.1	10.6	119.9
Average snowy days	12.7	11.3	12.5	9.6	6.7	1.8	0.2	0.1	2.1	7.2	10.8	12.1	87.1
Average relative humidity (%)	62.7	64.2	64.8	69.7	78.0	84.3	85.1	86.4	79.6	67.1	65.6	64.3	72.6
Source: Danish Meteorlogical Institute
