= Danish Civil Aviation and Railway Authority =

Coordinates: 55.6320°N 12.5779°E

The Danish Civil Aviation and Railway Authority (Danish: Trafikstyrelsen) is a government agency responsible for regulating, planning and safety relating to public transport in all of the Kingdom of Denmark.

The agency advises the ministry on policy and strategic development in transport, and is the administrator of the government's procurement of ferry and rail transport through public service obligations. It collects and publishes statistics related to public transport.

The agency was reorganised on 14 April 2010, and was from 2010 to 2021 a part of the larger Danish Transport, Construction and Housing Authority (Danish: Trafik-, Bygge- og Boligstyrelsen). By royal resolution on 23 January 2021, the Ministry of the Interior and Housing was established, and the Authority's areas of responsibility for housing and construction were transferred to the newly established Danish Housing and Planning Authority. The Authority's name was changed to Danish Civil Aviation and Railway Authority.

== Overview ==
The headquarters are in Copenhagen, Denmark. In 2010, annual revenue was +1.4 billion DKK ($235 million USD), and the Authority had approximately 250 employees.

== Objective ==
The role of the Danish Transport Authority includes the following functions:

- The Danish Government's railway authority, responsible for regulation, planning, safety and transport co-ordination nationally and internationally.
- Civil Aviation Authority (CAA) in Denmark, Greenland and the Faroe Isles.
- Regulation, approval and oversight regarding market access for railway, aviation and postal services.
- International relations regarding transport markets including representation in forums within the European Union, intergovernmental organizations and the coordination of EU-matters and –hearings.
- Adviser to the Ministry of Transport on matters relating to transport policy and the strategic development of the transport sector.
- Licensing and transport-related training of personnel in the areas of railway, and aviation.
- Collection of data and publishing statistical information regarding railway safety, punctuality, etc.
