= Narsarsuaq Airport =

Airport located in Narsarsuaq, Kujalleq, Greenland

Narsarsuaq Airport Mittarfik Narsarsuaq
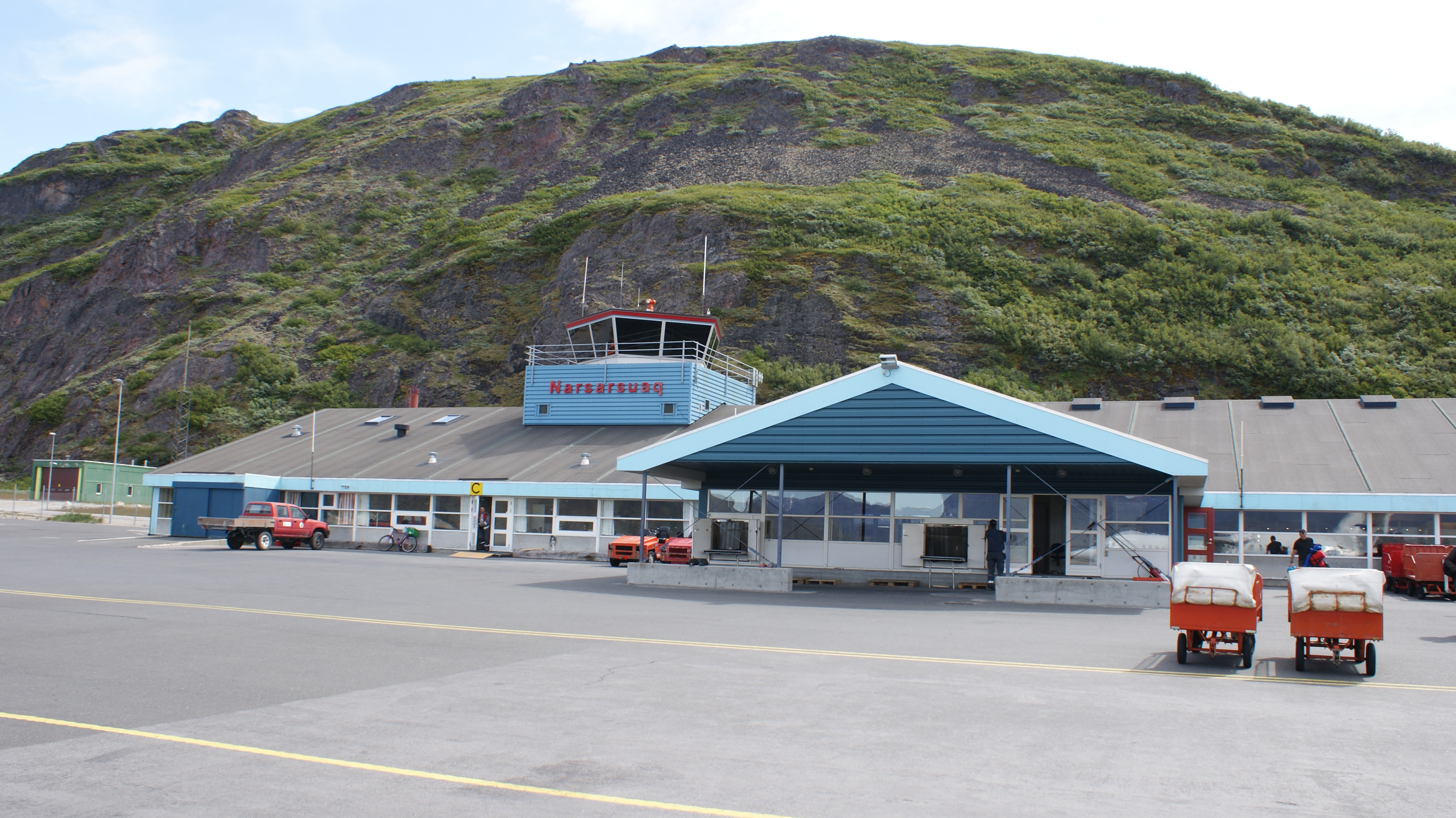
- IATA: UAK; ICAO: BGBW

Summary
- Airport type: Public
- Operator: Greenland Airport Authority (Mittarfeqarfiit)
- Serves: Narsarsuaq
- Elevation AMSL: 112 ft / 34 m
- Coordinates: 61°09′39″N 45°25′32″W
- Website: Narsarsuaq Airport

Map
- Location in Greenland

Runways
Direction	Length		Surface
Direction	m	ft	Surface
06/24	1,830	6,004	Concrete (Closed)

Statistics (2012)
- Passengers: 26,284
- Source: Danish AIS

Narsarsuaq Airport (Greenlandic: Mittarfik Narsarsuaq; Danish: Narsarsuaq Lufthavn; IATA: UAK, ICAO: BGBW) is a heliport and former international airport in Narsarsuaq, Kujalleq, Greenland. Along with Kangerlussuaq Airport, for over 70 years it was one of only two civilian airports in Greenland capable of serving large aircraft. It previously served domestic as well as international destinations including to Denmark and Iceland.

Scheduled fixed-wing services were transferred to the newly built Qaqortoq Airport on 16 April 2026 and Narsarsuaq Airport was subsequently downgraded to a heliport.

The settlement in which it is located in, Narsarsuaq, is small. The airport functioned primarily as a transfer point for passengers arriving by fixed-wing aircraft, connecting onwards by helicopter to larger settlements.

== History ==
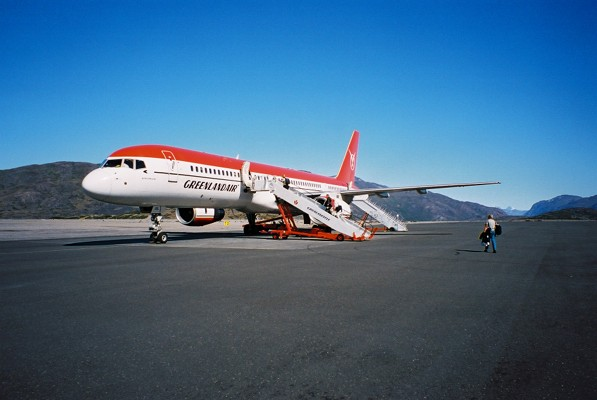
Air Greenland Boeing 757 at Narsarsuaq Airport in 2003

=== World War II ===
The airfield at Narsarsuaq was first built by the United States Department of War (now the Department of Defense) as an army airbase, its construction beginning in July 1941 and the first aircraft landing in January 1942. During World War II, the airbase−codenamed Bluie West One−hosted squadrons of PBY Catalina flying boats and B-25 Mitchell bombers with the assignment to escort allied convoys and track and destroy German submarines.

A military hospital with 250 beds was completed in 1943. Approximately 4,000 people were stationed at the base during the war. It is estimated that, during that time, more than 10,000 aircraft were ferried through the airbase. On 6 July 1942, the supply ship SS Montrose was wrecked on a cliff in the Tunulliarfik Fjord southwest of the airbase. The first aircraft from the Danish Air Force stationed at Narsarsuaq was a PBY Catalina in 1947 and a B-17 Flying Fortress in 1948.

=== After the war ===
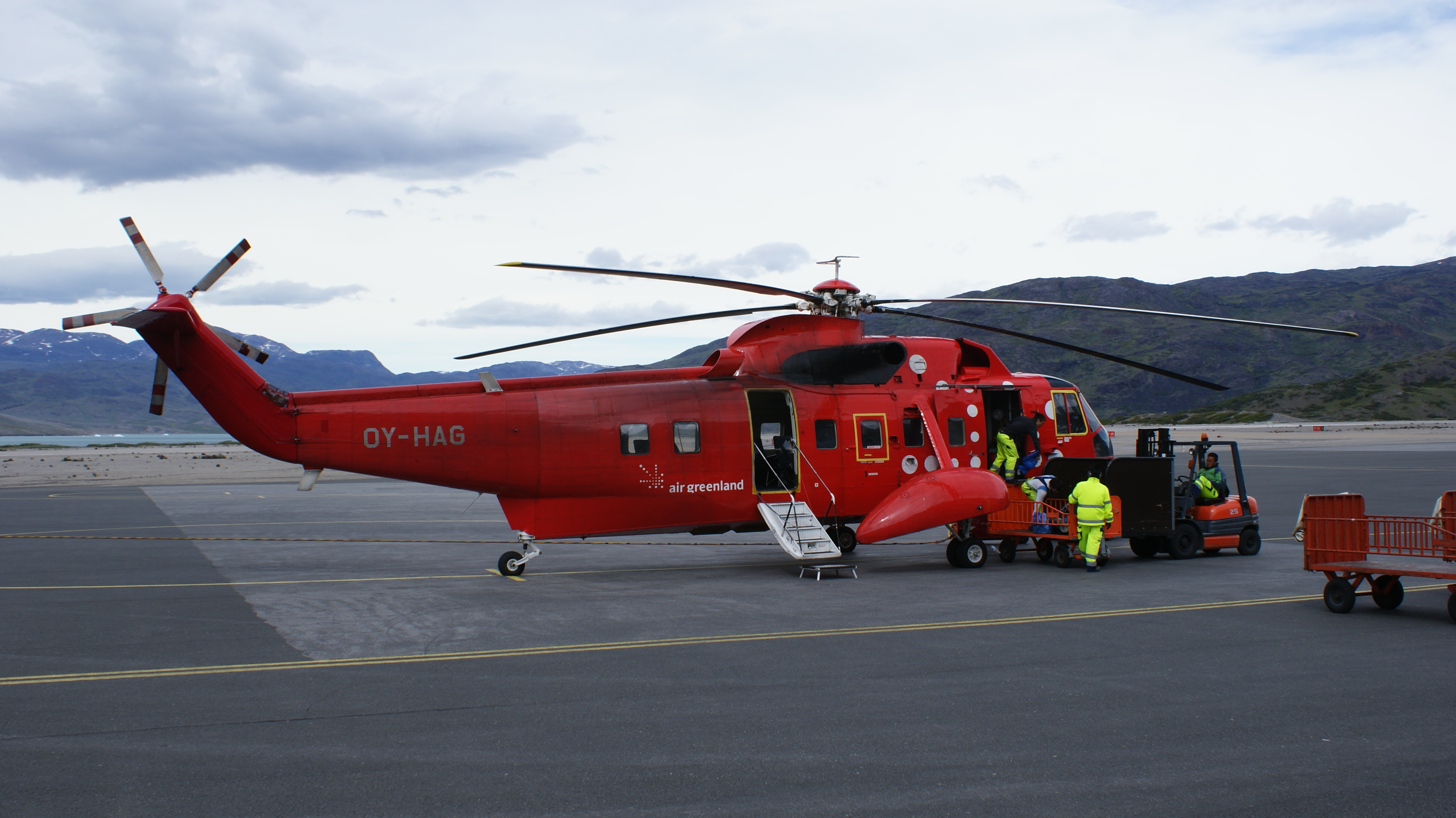
Air Greenland served all primary heliports in southern Greenland with a Sikorsky S-61N helicopter until the mid-2010s.

Civil air traffic began in 1949 with Douglas DC-4 propliners operated by Scandinavian Airlines System (SAS) and Icelandair. US and Denmark signed The Agreement related to the defense of Greenland on 27 April 1951, with both countries agreeing to share the Bluie West One airbase. In 1952, the Danish Air Force stationed Airgroup West with a PBY Catalina at the airport.

The US Air Force left Bluie West One in November 1958, and the airbase was closed. In January 1959, M/S Hans Hedtoft of Denmark and all on board were lost near the southern tip of Greenland. The Danish Authorities decided to reopen the airport soon after. From November 1959, the Danish Air Force had three PBY Catalinas stationed at Narsarsuaq with the assignment to make ice-observations along the coast of Greenland, and these observations were broadcast to ships in the area.

In the 1960s and 1970s, Greenlandair and SAS both served Narsarsuaq with Douglas DC-6 propliners while Icelandair operated Boeing 727 jets. During the 1980s, SAS operated Douglas DC-8 jets at Narsarsuaq. Since 1 January 1988, the airport has been operated by Mittarfeqarfiit, the Greenland Airport Administration. Ice-observations are still based at Narsarsuaq and carried out with the AS350 Eurocopter aircraft.

=== Decline ===
The airport served as a regional focus city for Air Greenland until the late 2000s, when tough economic conditions forced the airline to raise the low season prices several times. In 2009, the airline announced the sale of Kunuunnguaq, a Boeing 757-200, one of two airliners in the fleet, serving the Narsarsuaq-Copenhagen route.

Later in 2009, Air Greenland planned to introduce a triangular route between Narsarsuaq, Nuuk, and Reykjavík-Keflavík, using its newly acquired de Havilland Canada Dash-8 200 turboprops. Air Greenland's route to Reykjavík-Keflavík never materialised due to low ticket sales, adding to resentment amongst businesses and the community of South Greenland.

With Air Greenland's Boeing 757 sold on 26 April 2010, the southern Greenland remained without a direct connection to continental Europe. The 2008 financial crisis and the air travel disruption after the 2010 Eyjafjallajökull eruption both contributed to lower passenger demand, while competition from Air Iceland on the route to Iceland rendered the prospected Air Greenland route to Denmark unprofitable, leading directly to the decline in traffic in southern Greenland. In 2012, flights to/from Copenhagen restarted in the summer by chartering a separate operator, Jettime.

Air Iceland continued to serve seasonal flights to Reykjavík Airport using Fokker 50 aircraft, as it had done in years before. Icelandair (merged branding with Air Iceland Connect in 2021), redirected its flights to Reykjavík-Keflavík Airport (KEF) in 2022, from Reykjavík Airport (RKV). Icelandair had flown Narsarsuaq to Keflavík previously when it operated Boeing 727 jets. The airline began serving Narsarsuaq with Boeing 737 MAX 8 aircraft in 2024, but reverted to using Dash 8 aircraft the following summer.

The first Greenland Air Trophy took place at Narsarsuaq Airport, 30 June 2019. The winning pilot was Rene Petersen of Greenland, second and third places both taken by French pilots.

=== Conversion to heliport and transition to Qaqortoq Airport ===
After decades of discussion, in 2018 a decision was made to construct an airport nearer to Qaqortoq, the largest town in South Greenland. This eliminates the need for Narsarsuaq as a domestic and Iceland-bound gateway to South Greenland. Qaqortoq Airport opened in April 2026.

In 2022, the Greenlandic government decided that Narsarsuaq will be downscaled to a heliport, losing the runway. General aviation and ferry flights crossing the North Atlantic ocean will be redirected to other airports for refuelling, such as Qaqortoq Airport, which will have a similar runway length and operational capability as Narsarsuaq Airport. Narsarsuaq village will remain inhabited, though the future loss of the airport function is already having its toll.

Air Greenland's seasonal route to Copenhagen ceased on 16 September 2025, as from 2026, traffic will transition to Qaqortoq Airport and is unable to support larger transatlantic aircraft. Similarly, the last Icelandair flight to Reykjavík-Keflavík departed on 30 September 2025, as the summer season ended and will move its seasonal route to Qaqortoq Airport beginning in 2026.

In October 2025, Greenland Airport announced layoffs at Narsarsuaq Airport, involving around 70 people, as it begins to transition into a heliport.

Before the airport was downgraded, in the terminal there was a simple cafeteria, a duty-free 'Nanoq' shop, as well as a small tourist office, which helped coordinate general aviation activities at the airport.

On 16 April 2026, Qaqortoq Airport opened and all fixed-wing and connecting helicopter services were transferred there. The last flight departed on 15 April 2026 and Narsarsuaq Airport was subsequently downgraded to a heliport.

== Airlines and destinations ==
Airlines	Destinations
Air Greenland	Qaqortoq

== Accidents and incidents ==
- On 13 May 1957, a DC-4 freight aircraft operated by United States Overseas Airlines hit the icecap on approach to Narsarsuaq. Two were killed, of three on board.
- On 5 August 2001, Dassault Falcon 20C freight aircraft of Naske Air crashed on approach to Narsarsuaq. It planned a fuel stop, going from Poland to the US. All the three people on board were killed, including a passenger.

== Ground transport ==
Transfers to local settlements are normally done by boat or helicopter flights. Diskoline sells tickets to boats to Narsaq and Qaqortoq. Boats require a bus transfer since the port is around 2.5 km (1.5 mi) from the terminal.
