= Simiutaq (Kujalleq) =

Island in Greenland

Simiutak
- Location within Greenland

Geography
- Location: Labrador Sea
- Coordinates: 60°41′N 46°35′W

Administration
- Greenland
- Municipality: Kujalleq

Simiutaq, old spelling Simiutak, is an uninhabited island in the Kujalleq municipality in southwestern Greenland. During the Second World War and after Simiutak was the site of a U.S. Navy facility code-named 'Bluie West 3'.

== Geography ==
Simiutaq is located south of the mouth of the Ikersuaq fjord in the Julianehab Bay, Labrador Sea, North Atlantic Ocean, near Qaqortoq.

Its name is a generic Inuit name for an island at the head of a fjord. It should not be confused with another Simiutak (a.k.a. 'Cruncher Island') in western Greenland that served as a support station for Sondrestrom Air Base, and known as 'Bluie West 9'.

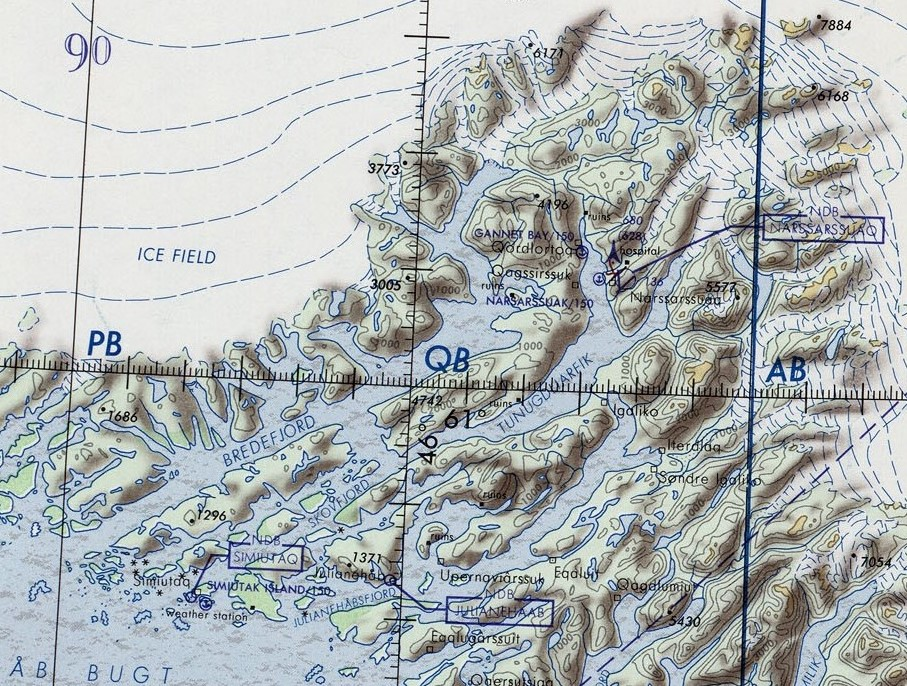
Map of Greenland section showing Simiutak Island

== Radio station ==
The station at Simiutak Island, commonly referred to as Bluie West 3 (BW-3) during the time of American operation, was a major wartime radio communications and meteorological facility on the southwest coast of Greenland, marking the entrance to the fjords that led to Narsarsuaq and Julianehaab. The U.S. Army facility was operational long into the post-war era. Four miles east from Simiutak was the U.S. Navy station Gamatron, which was abandoned after the war.

=== Foundation ===
The U.S. Coast Guard searched for a suitable site for a radio direction finding (RDF) site in the Julianehaab area in July 1941, to serve as an auxiliary for sea traffic and anticipated air traffic associated with the BW-1 base which began construction that month. Coast Guard documents show the ship Algonquin arriving from Boston with a radio beacon for Site A (Gamatron) in November. The cutter North Star searched for a construction site and transported men and equipment there. Construction of Gamatron and Simiutak was carried out simultaneously in November and December 1941 and expanded as needed thereafter. On 13 December, USCGC North Star left having erected supplies and temporary housing. USCGC Raritan supported the construction of nearby BW-3.

=== Operation ===
Gamatron was in partial operation from 10 January 1942 and in full operation from 30 March. On 15 August BW-3 was declared in full operation and simultaneously, nearby aircraft guard station "C" (ship) was abandoned.

Cruncher Island (BW-9) was built June - August 1942. On 4 September the Light and Radio Beacon were declared operational.

BW-3 became an essential navigation aid for ships and aircraft. A non-directional beacon (NDB) was situated there to provide a coastal fix for aircraft attempting the BW-1 approach. A weather station reported aviation weather. A high frequency (HF) communications site was set up to communicate with aircraft over a wide area. Gamatron was listed as having a camp for one officer and forty enlisted men.

After the United States Air Force left BW-3, agencies of the Danish government took over and operated the site for many years. While there is no native population close by, the site was frequently visited by vessels transiting the area.

In 1945, the U.S. State Department defined the Simiutak Defense Area as the entire island of Simiutak situated at the mouth of Skovfjord at approx. 6041N and 4634W and the adjacent waters for a distance of one mile for the shore line. The nearby naval facility of Gamatron was defined similarly as the unnamed (Gamatron) Island lying south of Hollaender Island at approx. 6040N and 4626W and the islands and waters adjacent thereto for a distance of one mile from the shoreline. BW-9 was defined as 66N to 6607N and 5325W to 5348W.

== See also ==
- List of islands of Greenland
