= Bluie East Two =

Ikateq
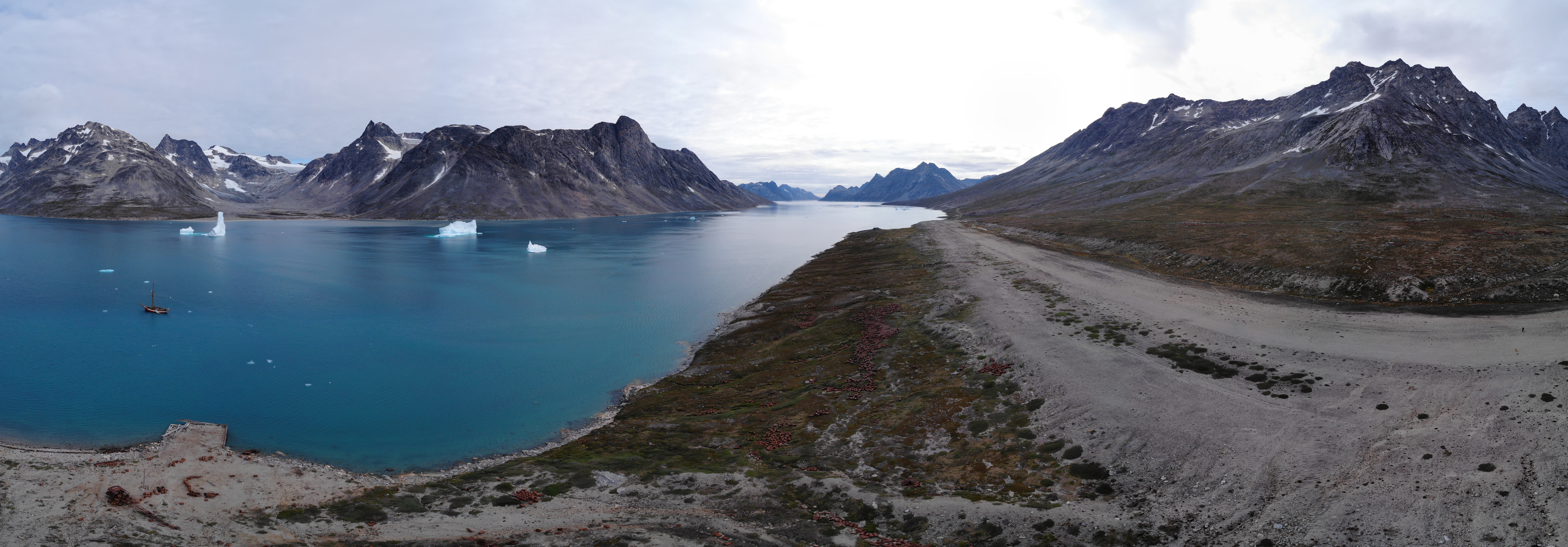
- IATA: none; ICAO: none

Summary
- Location: Ikateq Fjord, Greenland
- In use: 1942–1947
- Coordinates: 65.9415°N 36.6751°W

Map
- Location within Greenland

Bluie East Two was a minor United States Army Air Forces airfield at Ikateq in eastern Greenland. It was operational from 1942 to 1947.

== Founding and construction ==
After the United States assumed responsibility for the defense of Greenland in April 1941, the urgent need for establishing airfields in the area caused the Army to USAAF Captain Elliott Roosevelt performed aerial reconnaissance of the area in a B-24 staging from RAF Reykjavík. Although minor sites were found, no flat area suitable for the desired 5,000 foot runways and clear approaches could be identified.

As a result, the BE-2 expedition in September 1941 was limited to establishing a radio and weather reporting station at the village of Angmagssalik, the only sizable human habitation along the coast. This was an 11-man expedition led by Antarctic veteran, Lt. (j.g.) Frederick E. Crockett, USNR. The team arrived in the area on USCGC North Star and the steamer Lake Ormoc, a merchant marine vessel, on or near 20 September 1941. However, due to a series of delays, Coast Guard records show M/S Lake Ormoc did not depart Reykjavik for the site until 31 October, arriving on 2 November with the Army weather station, and departing 15 November.

Lt. Crockett used dog teams to reconnoitre the area around Angmagssalik. In November 1941, he found an alluvial shelf at the base of high mountains which faced a narrow strait near Eskimo huts named Ikateq. This site was about 57 kilometers (31 nautical miles) northeast of Tasiilaq (formerly Angmagssalik) at 65°56′50″N 36°39′50″W , and was subject to extreme weather. On 26 July 1942, the USCGC Comanche led a supply flotilla bringing the construction crews to complete a 4,000 foot gravel runway and associated facilities. On 1 November, the BE-2 station began reporting weather from the new location. The 5,000 foot runway was completed in 1943.

== Operations ==
Bluie East Two never attained the prominence in trans-Atlantic air traffic originally intended, but it served very well in the alternate airfield, meteorology and navigation, and search-and-rescue support capacities. In 1943, Colonel Bernt Balchen used the field for a bombing raid against a German weather station at Sabine Island, 600 miles north. The raid failed due to weather, and Balchen completed the raid later from Reykjavík. Balchen and Crockett also used BE-2 for support of the epic rescue operations on the ice cap during 1942 and 1943.

The weather and the airways radio detachments regularly exchanged personnel with the station at Cape Dan, Kulusuk, 30 miles away. BE-2 also supported outlying stations at Walrus Bay (Scoresbysund) and Comanche Bay. Transportation was effected by aircraft from Bluie West One, a local Norseman ski aircraft, a station vessel named the Judy How, and occasionally dog sled and ski patrol.

The field was resupplied seasonally by the U.S. Coast Guard, and received regular air supplies and drops when the runway could not be cleared. After 1945, the field declined in importance, and it was evacuated at the end of 1947 along with many other American stations in Greenland.

In July 1945, the U.S. State Department defined the Ikateq Defense Area as 6654N to 6600N and 3630W to 3649W. The associated auxiliary weather station at Cape Dan was defined by a two-mile radius circle centered at 6532N, 3710W. At the same time the claim to the original station at Angmagssalik village was deleted.

== Legacy ==
The Danish government had no interest in the facility, and the equipment, fuel, and any usable items were appropriated by visiting locals. The strip remained useful for ad hoc air operations, and served in a supply role for the construction of the early warning radar station DYE-4 at Kulusuk farther south in 1958. Kulusuk is now Angmagssalik's main airport, although its distance requires further helicopter flights to the village and other nearby settlements. In 2017 the VintageAirRally started using the base to raise awareness of the historical significance of the location, and also to highlight the environmental issues.

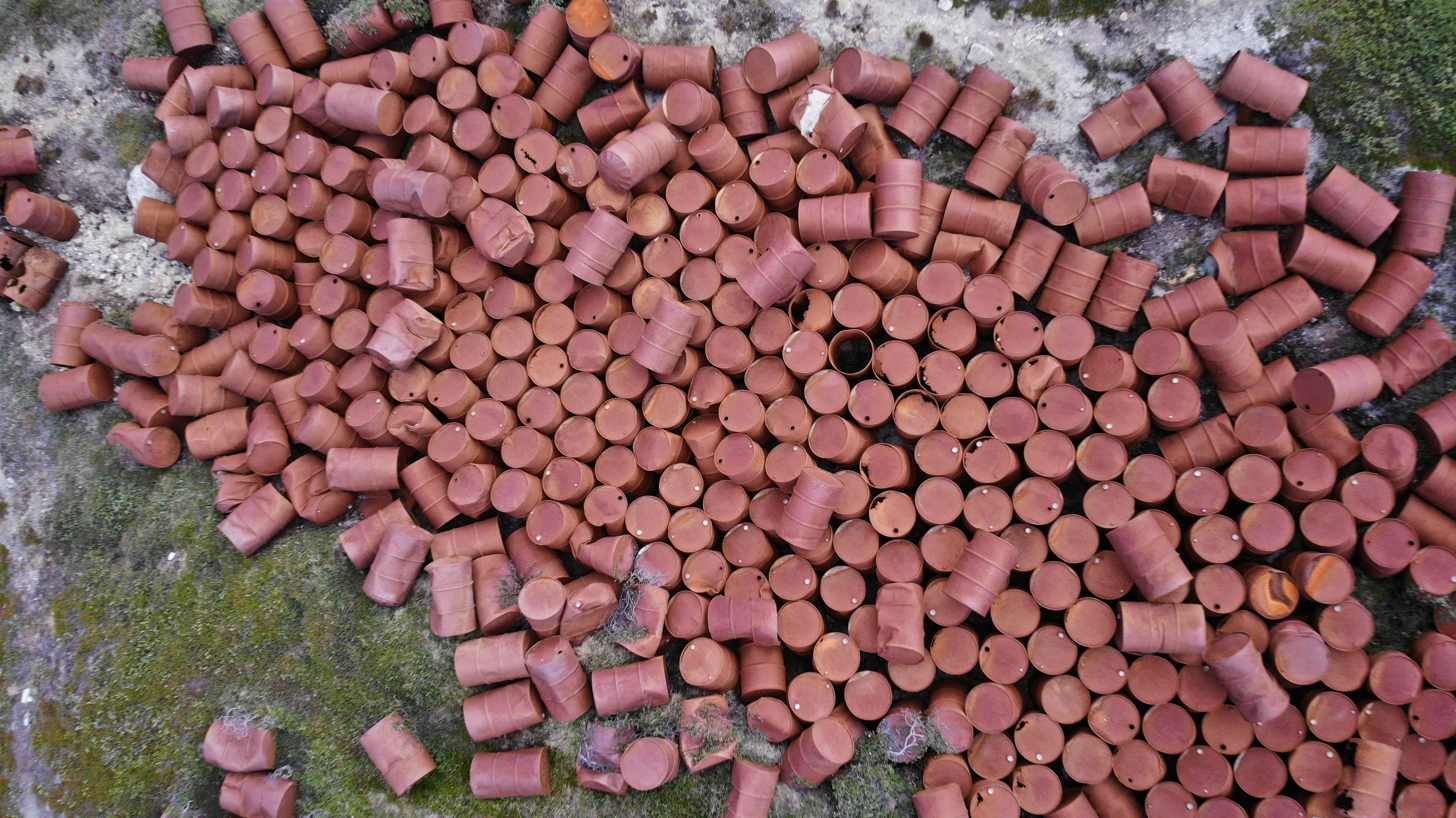
Old fuel drums left at the station

Reports and photographs show Ikateq with considerable rusted fuel drums, vehicles, and ruins. The need for a clean-up has been an occasional political issue - resolved (at least financially) by an agreement mid-2017 between the Danish and Greenland governments. The clean-up was started in summer 2019, and is done by the company 60 North Greenland. It is estimated around 200,000 oil drums are at the site, so cleanup is expected to take significant amount of time, since it can only be done during summer months.

== Name ==
Ikateq means "shallow water". "Bluie West" and "Bluie East" were wartime code-names adopted for the two strings of planned radio stations in Greenland by the USAAC in 1941. BE-2 was frequently referred to as Optimist, perhaps due to the urgent anticipation preceding its discovery. Air Transport Command called the field Curio in coded traffic.

Care must be exercised in affirming the station's location, since BE-2 originally reported from Angmagssalik, and another nearby coastal station at Cape Dan also reported weather during the war. Nearby Kulusuk reported after 1960. BE-2 should not be confused with the abandoned Inuit settlement of Ikkatteq, which was located to the southwest of Angmagssalik.
