= Marrak Point =

- IATA: none; ICAO: none

Summary
- Location: Marraq Peninsula, Greenland
- In use: 1942–1945
- Coordinates: 63°26′04.37″N 51°10′12.27″W

Map
- Location within Greenland

Marrak Point was the location and common name for a minor United States Army Air Forces airfield on the west coast of Greenland. It was operational from 1942 to 1945.

== Name ==
The station was referred to as Bluie West Four (BW-4) in the USAAF, and as "Teague Field" by many. The location was marked as "Teague" on post-war aeronautical maps. State Department documents of 1945 define the U.S. Defense Area there as 6324N to 6327N, 5104W to 5116W.

== History ==
Lt. Teague, a USAAF B-17 pilot, discovered Marrak Point by accident on 5 June 1942. His aircraft was part of a movement of B-17s across the Atlantic via Sondrestrom (BW-8). Unable to find his destination and running out of fuel, his crew searched the west coast for a flat place and set down successfully on the flat, rocky surface at Marrak Point. Assisted and refueled by the USCGC North Star days after, the B-17 returned to Sondrestrom on 11 June and it was decided to turn the landing place into a radio and weather station with an accompanying airstrip. The station, which is midways between BW-8 and BW-1, was then added to the airways system as BW-4. The first intended aircraft movement occurred on 4 October 1942, when a PBY-5A from VP-93 at BW-1 landed there.

Marrak Point was the site of a major air crash in August 1945, when an Army OA-10 Catalina from BW-1 crashed into nearby mountains with the loss of all aboard.

Marrak Point is one of the locations along the route of the Greenland Air Trophy 2019.

== Legacy ==
Despite its advantageous location close to the capital Godthaab (84 km (52 mi)) and other populated areas on the western coast, the Danish government could find no use for the airfield after the USAAF evacuated it after the war. Remaining stores and items were taken or vandalized by locals. Remaining usable, the runway was kept on air navigation charts for many years.
