= Sondrestrom Air Base =

US Air Force base in Greenland (1941–1992)

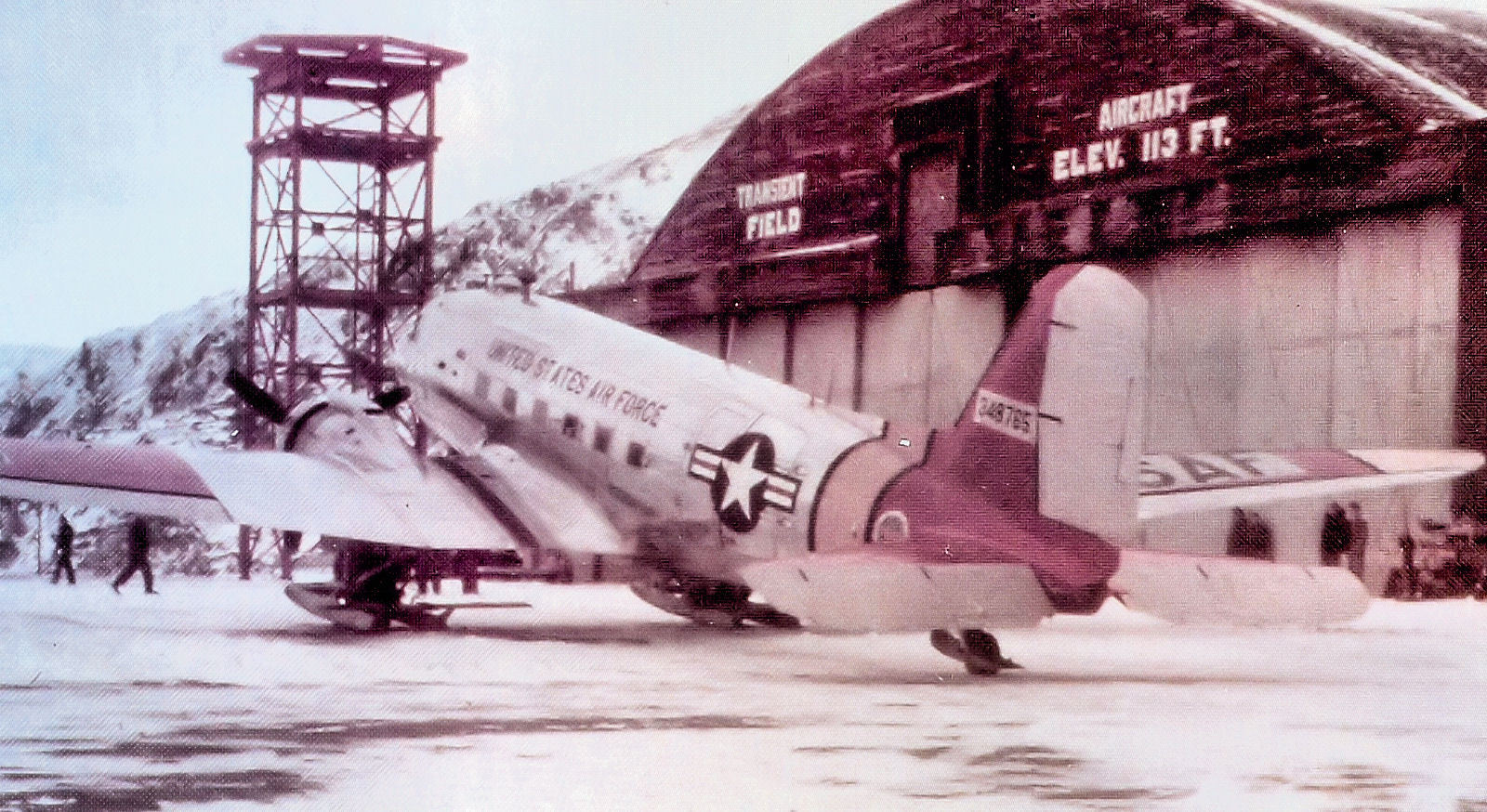
- C-47 at Sondrestrom Air Base, 1950s

Site information
- Type: Military airfield
- Controlled by: United States Air Force

Location
- Location in Greenland
- Coordinates: 67°00′38.00″N 050°42′33.00″W

Site history
- Built: 1941
- In use: 1941–1992

Sondrestrom Air Base, originally Bluie West-8, was a United States Air Force base in central Greenland. It was closed in 1992 and it is now the site of Kangerlussuaq Airport. The site is located 60 mi (97 km) north of the Arctic Circle and 90 mi (140 km) from the northeast end of Kangerlussuaq Fjord (formerly known by its Danish name Søndre Strømfjord). The base is approximately 11 mi (18 km) west-northwest of Ravneklippen and 80 mi (130 km) east of Sisimiut.

Following World War II, the base was briefly returned to Danish control between 9 October 1950 and 20 July 1951. The 1951 Greenland bases treaty led to the return of Sondrestrom to American control.

== History ==
=== Names ===
- Established on 20 October 1941 and named Bluie West Eight (BW-8); codenamed "Bodkin" in communications.

Renamed: Sondrestromfjord Army Air Base, 1945
Renamed: Sondrestromfjord Air Base, 25 October 1947
Renamed: Sondrestrom Air Base, 10 January 1952

=== Base operating units ===
- 417th Base HQ & Air Base Squadron, 26 September 1942
- 1385th Army Air Force Base Unit, 1 October 1945
- 1004th Air Base Squadron (redesignated: 1234th Air Base Squadron, 1 October 1948), 1 June 1948
- Greenland Base Command, 21 June 1949 – 9 October 1950
- 6621st Air Base Squadron, 20 July 1951
- 6621st Air Base Group, 25 September 1955
- 4084th Air Base Group, 1 April 1957
- 4684th Air Base Group, 1 July 1960 – 1 June 1992
- 1015th Air Base Squadron, a subordinate unit to the 1012th Air Base Group at Thule, was the unit designation from at least March, 1985 to closing in September, 1992
- 2004th Airways & Air Communications Squadron(AACS)(MATS)

=== Major commands to which assigned ===
- First United States Army, 15 January 1941
- Eastern Defense Command (U.S. Army), 12 December 1942
- Air Transport Command, 1 January 1946
- Military Air Transport Service, 1 April 1948
- Northeast Air Command, 1–9 October 1950; 20 July 1951
- Strategic Air Command, 1 April 1957
- Air Defense (redesignated: Aerospace Defense) Command, 15 January 1968
- Strategic Air Command, 1 December 1979 – 30 June 1983
- Air Force Space Command from 1 July 1983 to September 1992 closing

=== Founding and construction ===
Following the fall of Denmark to Germany in World War II, responsibility for the security of Greenland passed to the American military under the terms of a 9 April 1941 treaty with the defected Danish ambassador in Washington, Henrik Kauffmann. Military leaders responded by building several bases in Greenland, the largest of which were Bluie West One in Narsarsuaq in southern Greenland and Bluie West Eight along the Kangerlussuaq fjord.

The site of BW-8 had already been contemplated for an airfield, and Professor William Hobbs of the University of Michigan had operated a meteorological station there in 1927–28. That station was named Mount Evans, while the supporting base camp at the site of the present seaport was named Camp Lloyd. A 1,500 foot long dirt airstrip eight miles east was prepared for the expected aircraft of Atlantic flyers Bert Hassell and Parker Cramer. They, however, ran out of fuel and walked the remaining distance to Sondrestrom. The location at the bottom of Sondrestromfjord is about as far from the coast as one can get on land in Greenland, and though the climate is severe, it is much more favorable for aviation than the coast. The approaches are clear, although the runway has a slope.

During August 1940, the U.S. Coast Guard Cutter Duane supported an aerial survey commanded by Army Captain Julius K. Lacey. From Lacey's Curtiss SOC-4, numerous photographs were obtained of promising runway alignments in the area. From 6 to 11 May 1941, the South Greenland Survey Expedition led by Lieutenant Commander William E. Sinton further examined the area from the USCGC Northland, which now carried the same SOC-4 for aerial surveys. Charts and plans were drawn up in expectation of a major construction expedition that fall. The expedition also charted seaplane operating sites at Monroe Bay (Tatsip Ata) and Angujartorfik downfjords from Sondrestrom.

Bluie West-8 was founded on 7 October 1941 by a 31-man expedition commanded by Captain (later Colonel) Bernt Balchen of the United States Army Air Forces (USAAF). A major sealift followed. The airport was ready for operation in the spring of 1942. A road of about ten miles length connected the airfield site with the port location (Camp Lloyd) farther down the fjord. Seasonal access for ships is during late summer and early autumn, but during the early days the fjord ice was broken for a much longer period.

To identify and guide the approach to BW-8, an auxiliary station was placed at Cruncher Island, also known as Simiutak, at the entrance to Sondrestromfjord. This station, operational 4 September 1942, provided meteorological reports, radio communications, radio beacon and lights for air and sea traffic. It was known as BW-9.

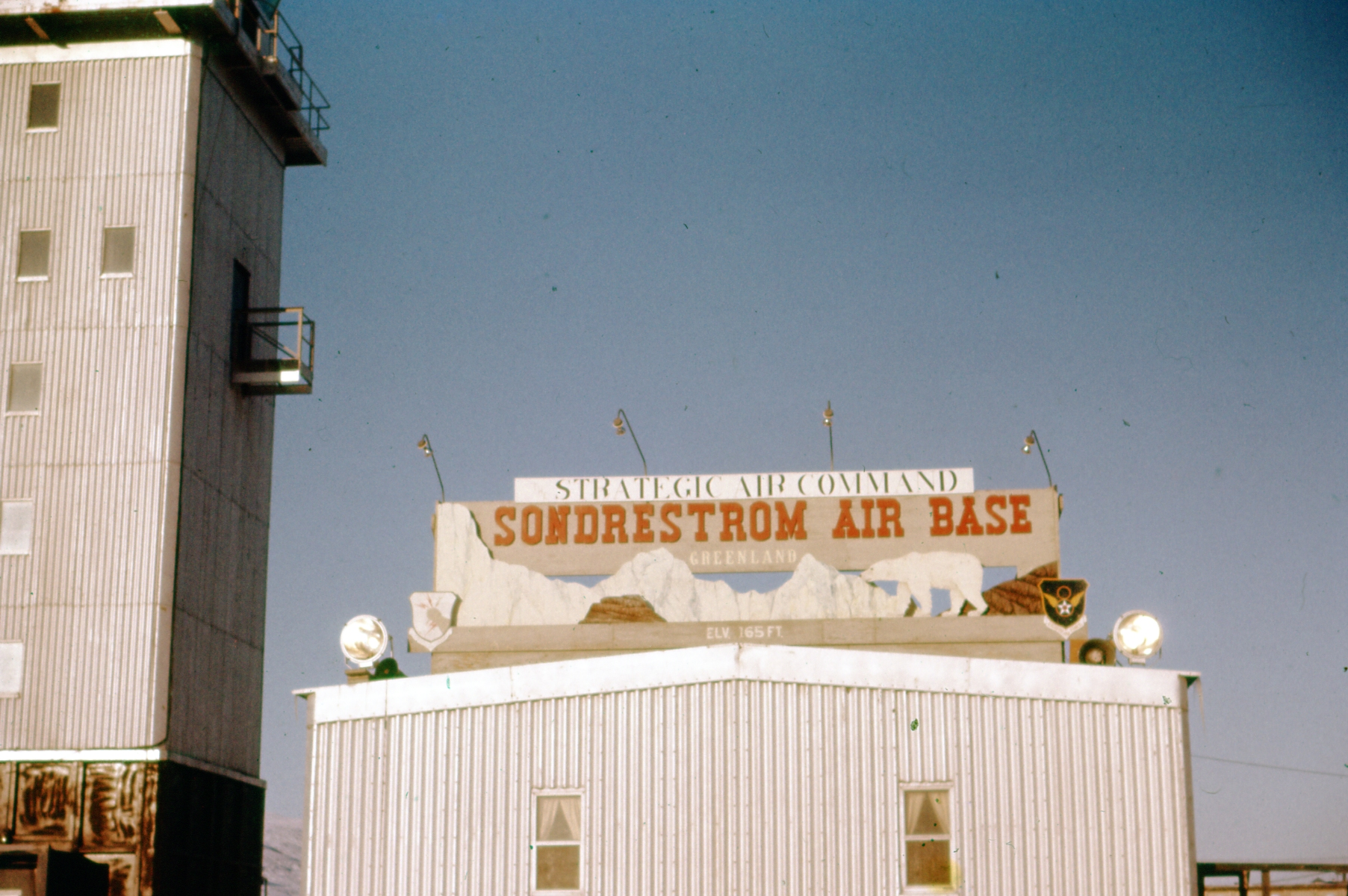
Sondrestrom Air Base in 1958

=== Operations ===
BW-8 was intended as a link in a northern air ferry route known to U.S. planners as the Crimson Route, but it transpired that few aircraft were ferried to Europe through it. Instead, the base earned its keep as an alternate field, a radio and weather reporting station, and as a departure point for search-and-rescue operations elsewhere in Greenland. During the two years Colonel Balchen was in command, he led numerous expeditions throughout the island, primarily in rescue operations for downed aircrew.

As a reliever for the Greenland Command headquarters base in Narsarsuaq, Bluie West One, BW-8 was by late 1942 assisted by small fields at Bluie East Two in East Greenland, and Teague Field on the west coast about midway between BW-8 and BW-1.

The Danish government briefly controlled the base in 1950, but following a renewed base treaty (also resulting in the construction of Thule Air Base), the United States reopened BW-8 under the name of Sondrestrom Air Base on 27 April 1951. Sondrestrom AB then became instrumental in the airlift to build Thule AB, although it had little function of its own, and rarely had permanently stationed aircraft. However, the base also served to support air refueling tankers, and trans-Atlantic ferry flights for short-ranged jet fighters continued to transit in the post-war period.

When the Distant Early Warning Line was constructed in the late 1950s and early 1960s, Sondrestrom AB received a new lease on life. It assisted especially in the building of the four radar stations spanning Greenland (DYE-1 through 4). Sondrestrom was designated as DYE-6 in this regard.

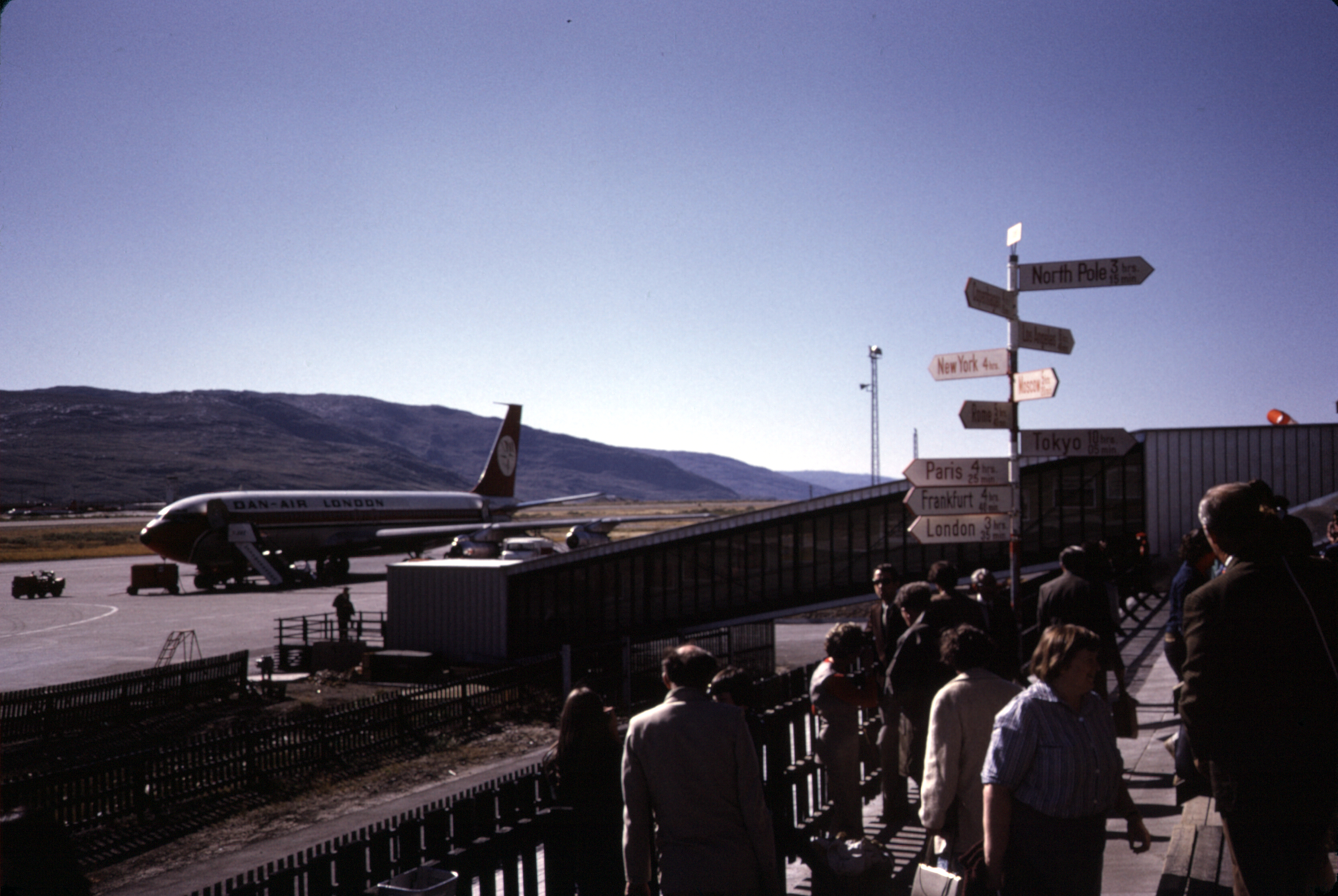
Passenger airplane at Sondrestrom Air Base in August 1974

In the mid-1950s, Scandinavian Airlines System (SAS) began using the base as a refueling station on their then-new "Polar route" between Scandinavia and the United States. In 1956, SAS was operating three round trip flights a week with Douglas DC-6B propliners on a routing of Copenhagen – Sondrestrom – Winnipeg – Los Angeles. In the early 1960's, SAS' new DC-8-33 jets operated a Copenhagen-Sondrestrom-Los Angeles route. This use declined in the mid-1960s, as fan-jet airliners gained greater range. In the 1970s, Boeing 707-320B jetliners operated by Dan-Air between the United Kingdom and Vancouver stopped to refuel. The base also became the hub of Greenland air traffic and was the destination for almost all regular air service from and to Copenhagen. The United States Air Force continued to use the base for occasional traffic, and in particular for the yearly resupply of the DYE stations. It was also a center for seasonal scientific activity.

Following the fall of the Soviet Union and the abandonment of the DYE stations in 1991, the usefulness of the base was greatly diminished. The last US Air Force personnel left the base on 30 September 1992. It then became Kangerlussuaq airport and was the main hub for Greenland air travel, until the opening of the expanded Nuuk Airport in 2024.

== Rocket launches ==
Since 1971, rockets such as the Nike Apache, Petrel, Nike Tomahawk, Black Brant, Terrier Malemute, Taurus Orion, and Taurus Nike Tomahawk TNT have been launched from a site close to Kangerlussuaq (specifically, at 67°01′23″N 050°35′49″W) for examination of the upper atmosphere.

=== Launch list ===
| Date | Vehicle | Mission | Results |
|---|---|---|---|
| 22 August 1971 | Nike-Apache | (DK) | S (225 km) |
| 24 August 1971 | Nike-Apache | (DK) | S (225 km) |
| 10 December 1972 | Nike-Tomahawk | (DK) | S (300 km) |
| 2 July 1974 | Nike-Tomahawk | NASA 18.156IE/UE | S (235 km) |
| 17 December 1974 | Black Brant IV | (GER) MPI | S (595 km) |
| 17 December 1974 | Petrel | (UK) P86G | S (175 km) |
| 17 December 1974 | Petrel | (UK) P87G | S (170 km) |
| 18 December 1974 | Black Brant IV | (GER) MPI | S (550 km) |
| 18 December 1974 | Nike-Tomahawk | (DK) | E (20 km) |
| 18 December 1974 | Petrel | (UK) P166G | S (170 km) |
| 18 December 1974 | Petrel | (UK) P167G | S (170 km) |
| 11 January 1975 | Black Brant IV | (GER) MPI | S (610 km) |
| 22 August 1976 | Nike-Tomahawk | NASA 18.209IE CUSP II | S |
| 27 August 1976 | Nike-Tomahawk | NASA 18.210IE SEC II | S |
| 23 January 1985 | Terrier-Malemute | NASA 29.023UE | S |
| 23 January 1985 | Black Brant X | NASA 35.009UE | S |
| 10 February 1985 | Terrier-Malemute | NASA 29.015UE | S |
| 10 February 1985 | Black Brant X | NASA 35.012UE TOPAZ | S |
| 5 March 1985 | Taurus-Orion | NASA 33.044UE | S |
| 15 March 1985 | Black Brant IX | AFGL A21.426 | S |
| 20 March 1985 | Taurus-Tomahawk | NASA 34.006UE | S |
| 20 March 1985 | Nike-Tomahawk | NASA 18.219UE | S |
| 26 February 1987 | Terrier-Malemute | NASA 29.025UE | S |
| 26 February 1987 | Black Brant IX | AFGL A21.628 | S |
| 5 March 1987 | Terrier-Malemute | NASA 29.026UE | S |
| 5 March 1987 | Taurus-Nike-Tomahawk | NASA 38.012UE | S |
| 21 March 1987 | Taurus-Tomahawk | NASA 34.014UE | S |
| 21 March 1987 | Nike-Tomahawk | NASA 18.220UE | S |
| 21 March 1987 | Black Brant VIII?IX | AFGL A19.426 | S |
| 31 March 1987 | Black Brant IX | NASA 36.014UE COPE II | S (436 km) |
| 31 March 1987 | Taurus-Nike-Tomahawk | NASA 38.010UE COPE II | S (467 km) |
| 31 March 1987 | Taurus-Nike-Tomahawk | NASA 38.011UE COPE II | S (441 km) |

== Popular Culture ==
In Tom Clancy's 1986 techno-thriller Red Storm Rising, the first USAF air raid against the Soviets at NAS Keflavik on Iceland was by B-52 bombers from Barksdale Air Force Base in Louisiana that flew to Sondrestrom AB to refuel and load bombs for the mission.
