= Belinda Kirk =

British explorer and entrepreneur

- Occupations: Explorer, entrepreneur
- Known for: Captaining the first all-female rowing team to circumnavigate Britain non-stop
- Website: http://www.belindakirk.com/

Belinda Kirk (born 1974 or 1975) is a British explorer and entrepreneur. She is the founder of Explorers Connect, a social enterprise that connects people to opportunities for adventures and expeditions. In 2010, she captained the first all-female rowing team to circumnavigate Britain non-stop, completing the journey in 51 days.

== Biography ==
At the age of 18, Kirk went to Tanzania to study monkeys. Afterwards, she travelled across Africa by herself, an experience which she says had a profound impact on her sense of self-confidence and outlook in life. Among her other exploits, she has since traversed Nicaragua on foot, and searched for animal life in the Taklamakan Desert of China.

After working as a TV producer and director, Kirk decided to quit her job, instead focusing on finding ways to help people initiate their own trips and expeditions. “I worry that our society is not set up for adventures," Kirk says, "I’ve realised that we are very disconnected in the modern world from nature and challenge.”

In 2009, Kirk launched Explorers Connect, a social enterprise dedicated to helping people find their own adventures both in the UK and overseas. Composed of both beginner and expert explorers, the enterprise had 25,000 community members by 2016. Kirk has worked with TV adventurers Bear Grylls and Ray Mears.

In 2010, Kirk joined an all-female rowing team that called themselves the Seagals. Kirk acted as skipper, and her teammates included a Royal Navy nurse, an IT support manager, and the former US Marine Angela Madsen. They entered the Virgin GB Row 2010, an event that challenged rowers to circumnavigate Britain. The Seagals spent the full journey on board their boat, which was so small that only two people could sleep in the cabin at one time, and the teammates divided the rowing into two-hour shifts. Kirk and her crew became the first women to row non-stop around Britain, completing the 2,101 mile journey in 51 days and earning a place in the Guinness World Records.

Kirk organized the first Wild Night Out in July 2017, a national day of outdoor adventure, with the aim of encouraging people to try new experiences.

Kirk is a fellow of both the Royal Geographical Society and the British Exploring Society.

== Family ==
Kirk's father Maurice Kirk, nicknamed the "Flying Vet", is a retired veterinary surgeon and amateur aviator. In 2016, he participated in the five-week Vintage Air Rally, where vintage plane enthusiasts flew from Crete to Cape Town. Maurice made international headlines when his plane disappeared over Ethiopia, but he was found safe by search and rescue teams.
