= Bluie =

WWII United States military code name for Greenland

World War II US military bases in Greenland
Air base Airfield Radio and/or weather station Army base
Bluie West Two airfield never built

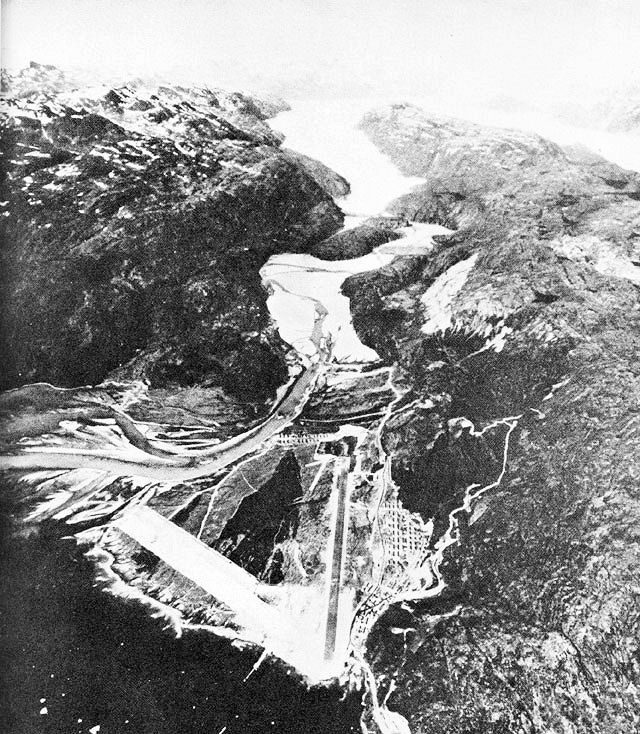
The airfield code-named Bluie West One became the best-known World War II military base on Greenland.

Bluie was the United States military code name for Greenland during World War II. It is remembered by the numbered sequence of base locations identified by the 1941 United States Coast Guard South Greenland Survey Expedition, and subsequently used in radio communications by airmen unfamiliar with pronunciation of the Greenlandic Inuit and Danish names of those locations. These were typically spoken BLUIE (direction) (number), with direction being east or west along the Greenland coast from Cape Farewell.

- Bluie East One: Torgilsbu radio and weather station at 60°9′N 43°53′W near Aqissiat on Prince Christian Sound
- Bluie East Two: Ikateq airfield with radio and weather station at 65°56′43″N 36°39′45″W
- Bluie East Three: Gurreholm radio and weather station at 71°14′43″N 24°35′01″W on Scoresby Sund
- Bluie East Four: Ella Island radio, weather, and sledge patrol station at 72°51′N 25°00′W
- Bluie East Five: Eskimonæs radio and weather station captured by German troops in 1943 and later reestablished at Myggbukta 73°29′28″N 21°32′26″W
- Bluie West One: Narsarsuaq Air Base at 61°10′N 45°26′W
- Bluie West Two: Kipisako unused alternative airfield location on Coppermine Bay
- Bluie West Three: Simiutak HF/DF station at 60°41′N 46°34′W
- Bluie West Four: Marrak Point airfield, radio and weather station at 63°27′N 51°11′W
- Bluie West Five: Aasiaat radio and weather station at 68°42′35″N 52°52′10″W on Disko Island
- Bluie West Six: Thule radio and weather station at 76°31′52″N 068°42′11″W
- Bluie West Seven: Kangilinnguit base at 61°14′00″N 48°05′55″W to defend the Ivittuut cryolite mine
- Bluie West Eight: Sondrestrom Air Base at 67°00′38″N 50°42′33″W
- Bluie West Nine: Cruncher Island light and radio beacon at 66°03′N 53°36′W

== Sources ==
- Morison, Samuel Eliot (1975). History of United States Naval Operations in World War II, Volume 1: The Battle of the Atlantic September 1939 – May 1943. Boston: Little, Brown and Company.
