= Taurus Nike Tomahawk =

Taurus Nike Tomahawk, or TNT for short, is a sounding rocket which was first built in 1983. When it was in operation it was used to explore the upper atmosphere.

The TNT was created by Wallops Flight Facility by combining a Taurus motor (the M6 engine from the Honest John rocket) as a first stage with a Nike Hercules Aerospace M5E1 solid fuel booster as a second stage, and a Tomahawk sounding rocket as the sustainer (these upper stages together are also known as the Nike Tomahawk).

The TNT flew 17 missions from Wallops Island, Poker Flat, Kwajalein and Sonde Stromfjord between 1 September 1983 and 6 December 1991, with only one failure (a success rate of 94%).

== See also ==
- NASA
