= Simiutaq Island =

Island of Greenland

Simiutaq
Nickname: Cruncher Island
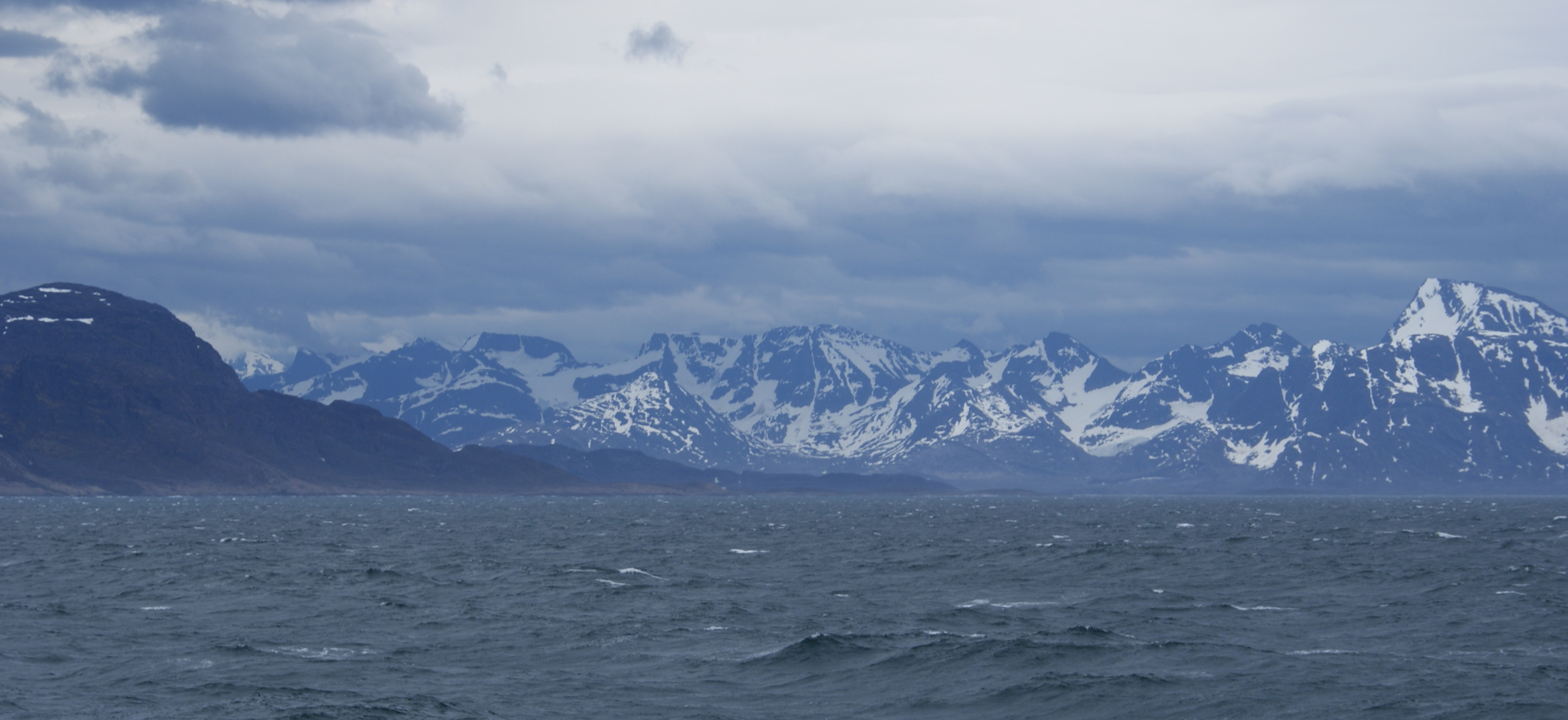
- Southern end of Simiutaq Island at the mouth of Kangerlussuaq Fjord

- Location within Greenland

Geography
- Location: Davis Strait
- Coordinates: 66°04′00″N 53°32′30″W

Administration
- Greenland
- Municipality: Qeqqata

Simiutaq Island is a 13 km × 10 km (8.1 mi × 6.2 mi) uninhabited island in the Qeqqata municipality in western Greenland, located in the mouth of the long Kangerlussuaq Fjord. It was also known informally as Cruncher Island.

Supply ships of Royal Arctic Line and cruise ships, such as Norway's Hurtigruten sail into Kangerlussuaq Fjord south of the island. The fjord is navigable in its entire length, with the ships mooring at the Kangerlussuaq port, west of Kangerlussuaq Airport. There are several small skerries in the mouth of the fjord, at the southern end of Simiutaq Island.

== Geography ==
The island is located on the shores of Davis Strait, separated from the mainland by the Amerluunguaq Strait in the north, and by the main arm of the Kangerlussuaq Fjord in the southeast. Its name is a generic Inuit name for an island at the head of a fjord. It should not be confused with Simiutaq (near Qaqortoq) in southwest Greenland.

Simiutaq is not an outlying island; it would have been a continuation of the landmass in the north were it not for the narrow and shallow Amerlunnguaq Strait, which branches to the west off Kangerlussuaq Fjord near the mouth of the latter. Simiutaq is roughly triangular in shape, mostly hilly, with low undulating plain in the north, and the highest point at 775 m (2,542.7 ft).

== Promontories ==
Direction	Latitude N	Longitude W
Northwestern Cape	66°05′10″	53°40′45″
Eastern Cape	66°04′43″	53°24′13″
Southern Cape	66°01′29″	53°34′00″

== Settlement ==
The closest settlement is Kangaamiut, located on a small island on the shores of Davis Strait, approximately 26 km (16 mi) south of the island.

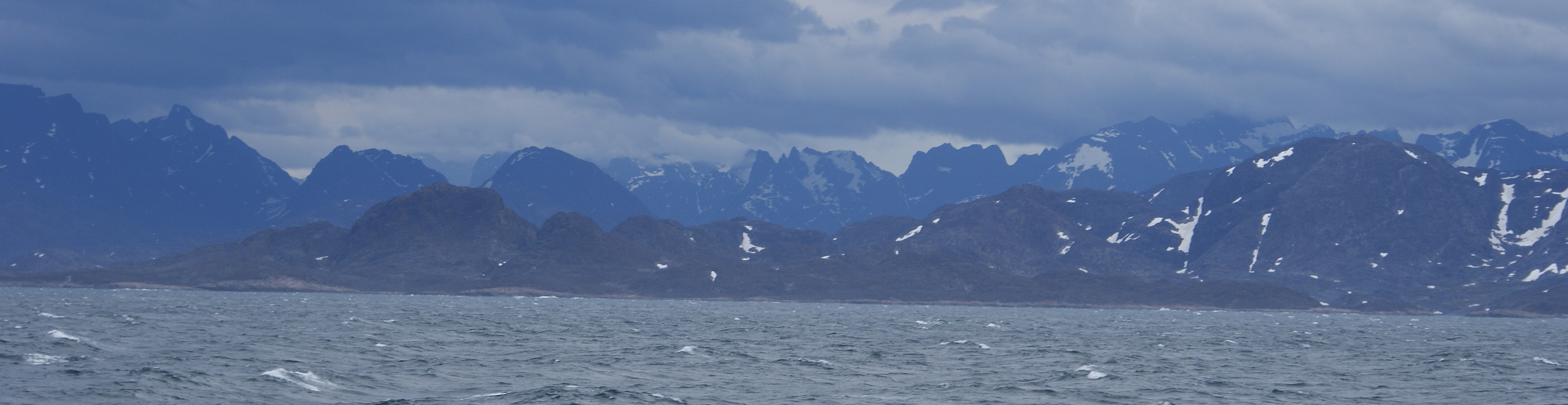
The northern end of Simiutaq Island in the mouth of Kangerlussuaq Fjord, seen in bad weather from the Sarfaq Ittuk ship of Arctic Umiaq Line during the Sisimiut-Kangaamiut voyage alongside the coast of Davis Strait.

== History ==
The "Cruncher Island" light and radio beacon, commonly referred to as Bluie West Nine (BW-9) during the time of American operation in Greenland during World War II, was a wartime radio communications facility located at 66°03′N 53°36′W on Simiutak Island.

== See also ==
- Bluie
- List of islands of Greenland
