= USCGC North Star =

American diesel-powered cutter

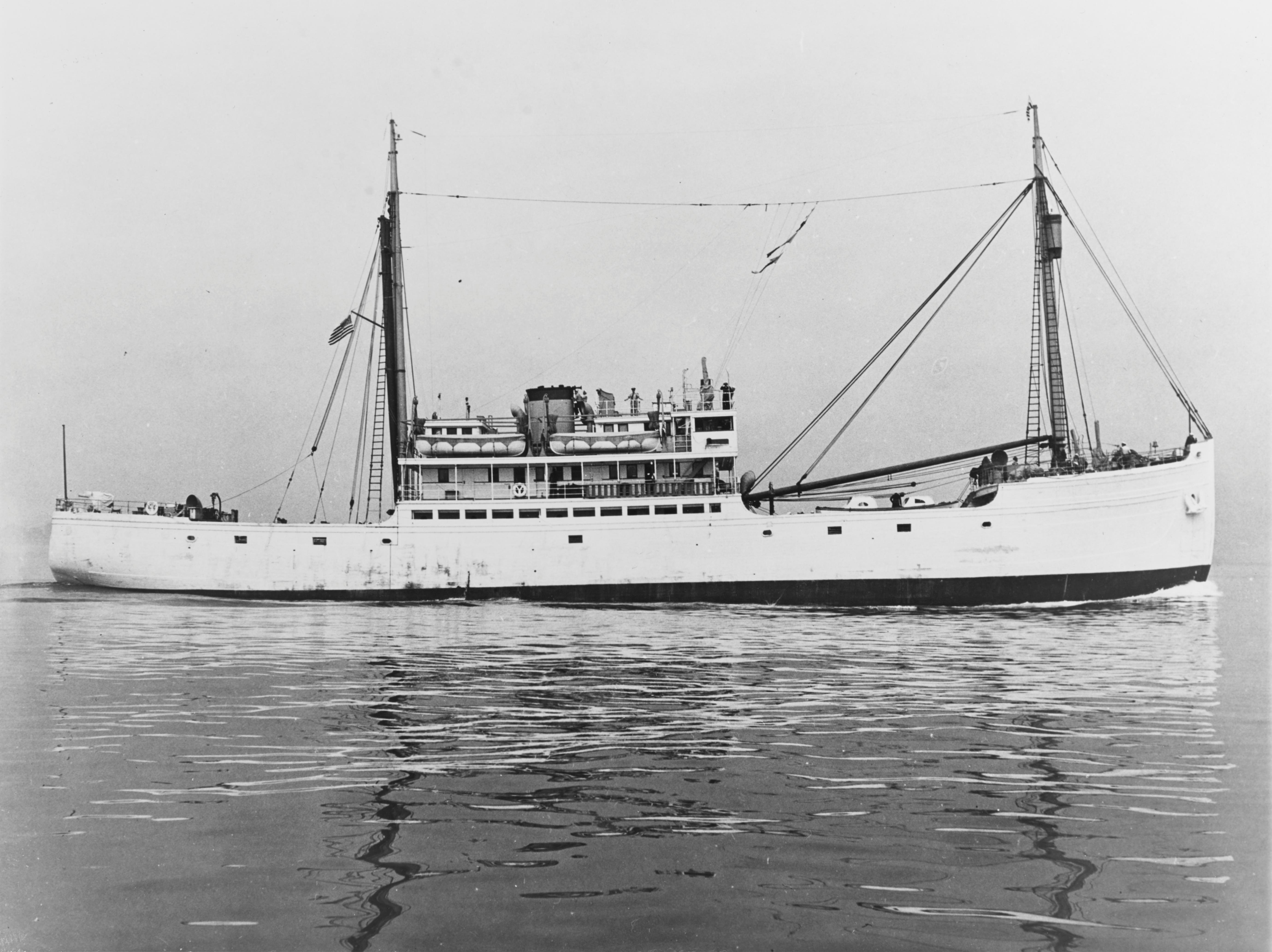
- USCGC North Star in June 1941

History

United States Bureau of Indian Affairs
- Name: USMS North Star
- Builder: Berg Shipbuilding Company
- Cost: $389,390.60
- Launched: 18 January 1932
- Home port: Seattle, Washington
- Fate: Transferred to U.S. Coast Guard

United States Coast Guard
- Name: USCGC North Star
- Commissioned: 14 May 1941
- Decommissioned: 13 January 1944
- Identification: Pennant No. WPG-59
- Fate: Transferred to U.S. Navy

United States Navy
- Name: USS North Star
- Commissioned: 15 January 1944
- Decommissioned: 15 June 1945
- Identification: Pennant No. IX-148
- Fate: Transferred to Bureau of Indian Affairs

United States Bureau of Indian Affairs
- Name: USMS North Star
- Acquired: 18 June 1945
- Home port: Seattle, Washington
- Fate: Sold for $108,000 in March 1951

United States
- Name: North Star
- Owner: Western Boatbuilding Co. (1951-1956); August P. Mardesich (1957-1967)
- Home port: Tacoma, Washington
- Identification: Official Number: 261698

General characteristics
- Displacement: 2,200 long tons (2,200 metric tons; 2,500 short tons)
- Length: 225 ft (68.58 m)
- Beam: 41 ft (12.50 m)
- Draft: 18.6 ft (5.67 m)
- Propulsion: one McIntosh & Seymour Diesel engine; 1,500 shp (1,100 kW)
- Speed: 13 knots (24 km/h; 15 mph)

The USCGC North Star was built for the Bureau of Indian Affairs in 1932 as an Arctic supply ship to bring food, supplies, and personnel to government schools, hospitals, and reindeer stations in Native Alaskan settlements, as far north as Point Barrow. From late-1939 to mid-1941 she was one of two ships that supported Rear Admiral Richard E. Byrd's third Antarctic expedition.

During World War II she became a U.S. Coast Guard cutter and was deployed to Greenland. After her Coast Guard service, in 1944, North Star was transferred to the U.S. Navy and focused on learning how to mothball the ships which would be stored in the National Defense Reserve Fleet. At the end of her naval service in 1945, she was returned to the Bureau of Indian Affairs which resumed using her as an Arctic supply ship.

She was sold by the government in 1951 and became a tender for fishing boats in Alaska. She was laid up in about 1958, and refit as a Mexican coastal freighter in 1968. Her ultimate fate is unknown.

== Construction and characteristics ==
On 6 February 1931 Congress appropriated $400,000 for the Bureau of Indian Affairs, a unit of the Department of the Interior, to construct a new vessel to replace USMS Boxer. On 29 April 1931 twelve bids were received by the Bureau to build the new ship. Berg Shipbuilding Company of Seattle was awarded the contract to build North Star on 15 May 1931. Its bid was $389,390.60.

North Star was designed by naval architect William C. Nickum of Seattle. Her hull was built of wood. She was 225 feet (69 m) long overall, with a beam of 41 feet (12 m), and a light draft of 14 feet (4.3 m). The ship was expected to operate in waters where sea ice was present. To protect her hull from ice it was sheathed with a layer of Australian ironbark, a very dense wood. The ironbark ice belt was 16 feet (4.9 m) wide from bow to stern from her waterline to her bilge keel.

North Star had a single 10-cylinder McIntosh & Seymour Diesel engine which produced 1,500 horsepower. This drove a single propeller which gave the ship a maximum speed of 13 knots. Her fuel tanks had capacity for 60,000 US gallons (230,000 L). At her cruising speed of 11 knots, she had an unrefueled range of 9,000 miles (14,000 km). She had port and starboard generators which provided electrical power aboard.

She had two masts which were used as derricks to load and unload the ship. The cargo winches, anchor windlass, and steering gear aboard were all electric. With her forward and aft holds, plus a deck load, North Star could carry about 2,000 tons of freight. Her freezer hold totaled 12,000 cubic feet.

When launched, North Star had accommodations for a crew of twenty, thirty-eight passengers connected with the schools, hospitals, and other government facilities she served, and twenty Alaskan natives. By 1937 her crew had grown to 10 officers and 16 men.

In 1952, her first year as a commercial vessel, her gross register tonnage was 1,642, and her net register tonnage was 1,116.

North Star was launched from Berg Shipbuilding's Ballard shipyard on 18 January 1932. While over 1,000 people watched, the ship was christened by Miss Elizabeth Pullen. Pullen was born in Alaska, where the ship was to serve, and living in Seattle to attend the University of Washington. Since Prohibition was in force, she christened the ship not with the traditional champagne, but with a bottle of water brought from Point Barrow. That gallon of Arctic Ocean was brought to Seattle aboard Boxer, the ship North Star was to replace. Alaska Governor George A. Parks, and Charles H. Hawksworth, Chief of the Alaska Division of the Bureau of Indian Affairs spoke at the launch event.

North Star's namesake was the North Star. The name was selected from 30 names submitted by Alaska residents. She was the first ship of three of that name to serve the Alaska native community for the United States Government. North Star II, which took over the job in 1949 was launched as the freighter Coastal Rider. North Star III, originally the Victory Ship Emory Victory, was converted to the Alaska service in 1961.

== U.S. Bureau of Indian Affairs (1932–1941) ==
North Star made as many as five trips per year from Seattle to Alaska. She visited some of the most remote settlements in the United States. In a single trip she visited as many as 95 communities along the Alaskan Coast. Her ports of call included Point Barrow, Cape Prince of Wales, Elim, Golovin, Juneau, Ketchikan, King Island, Kivalina, Klawock, Kotzebue, Little Diomede Island, Nelson Island, Nome, Point Hope, Point Lay, Seward, Shaktoolik, Shishmaref, Solomon, St. Lawrence Island, St Michael, Unalakleet, Wainwright and Wrangell. Many of these communities were inaccessible in the winter due to sea ice, so North Star's last trip of the year was their last connection to the rest of the world for months.

She carried a wide-variety of cargoes for these communities. They included school supplies, diesel oil, coal, 21,000 ties for the Alaska Railroad, lumber, stoves, even a prefabricated house. In 1936 she carried a school bus to Seward. Her freezer hold was used to transport reindeer carcasses to market. On her southbound trips, she carried whale bone, walrus ivory, furs, fossils for the Smithsonian Institution, and in 1934, $400,000 in gold bullion from Seward Peninsula diggings.

The ship routinely carried nurses, teachers, and other employees of the Bureau of Indian Affairs. She also transported personnel from the Alaska Railroad, the Army Signal Corps, the U.S. Biological Survey, and the Coast and Geodetic Survey, among others.

In the spring of 1935, in the depths of the Great Depression, North Star was chartered by the California State Emergency Relief Administration to take unemployed workers to the Matanuska Valley in Alaska. With extra berthing installed in the aft hold at the Todd Shipyard, North Star carried 118 preliminary workers to begin the Matanuska Valley Colony in May 1935. Accompanying them were 1,900 tons of freight including tractors, horses, trucks, tents, and other supplies to support the establishment of the new farming area. She made a second supply run in June 1935 carrying 60 horses, 80 cattle, and 50 hogs, plus lumber, machinery, and food.

North Star was designed to contend with sea ice and frequently did. In September 1933, the four-masted schooner C. S. Holmes was trapped in sea ice for three weeks 70 miles south of Point Barrow. North Star was able to work through the ice and tow her to Barrow, where both vessels discharged winter supplies for the community. North Star and her crew earned a letter of commendation from Secretary of the Interior Harold Ickes for the rescue.

=== U.S. Antarctic Service Expedition (1939–1941) ===
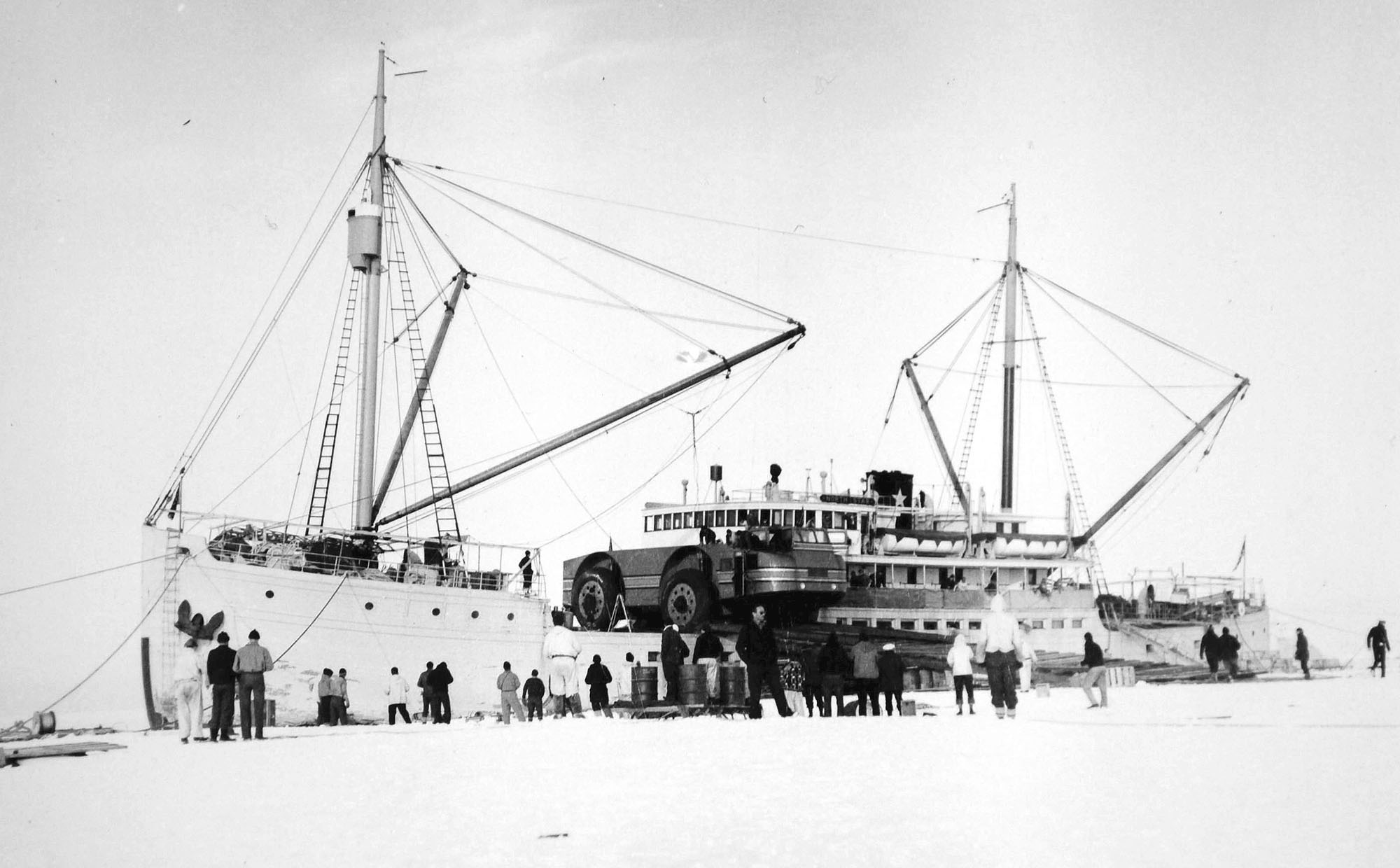
Antarctic snow cruiser driving off North Star

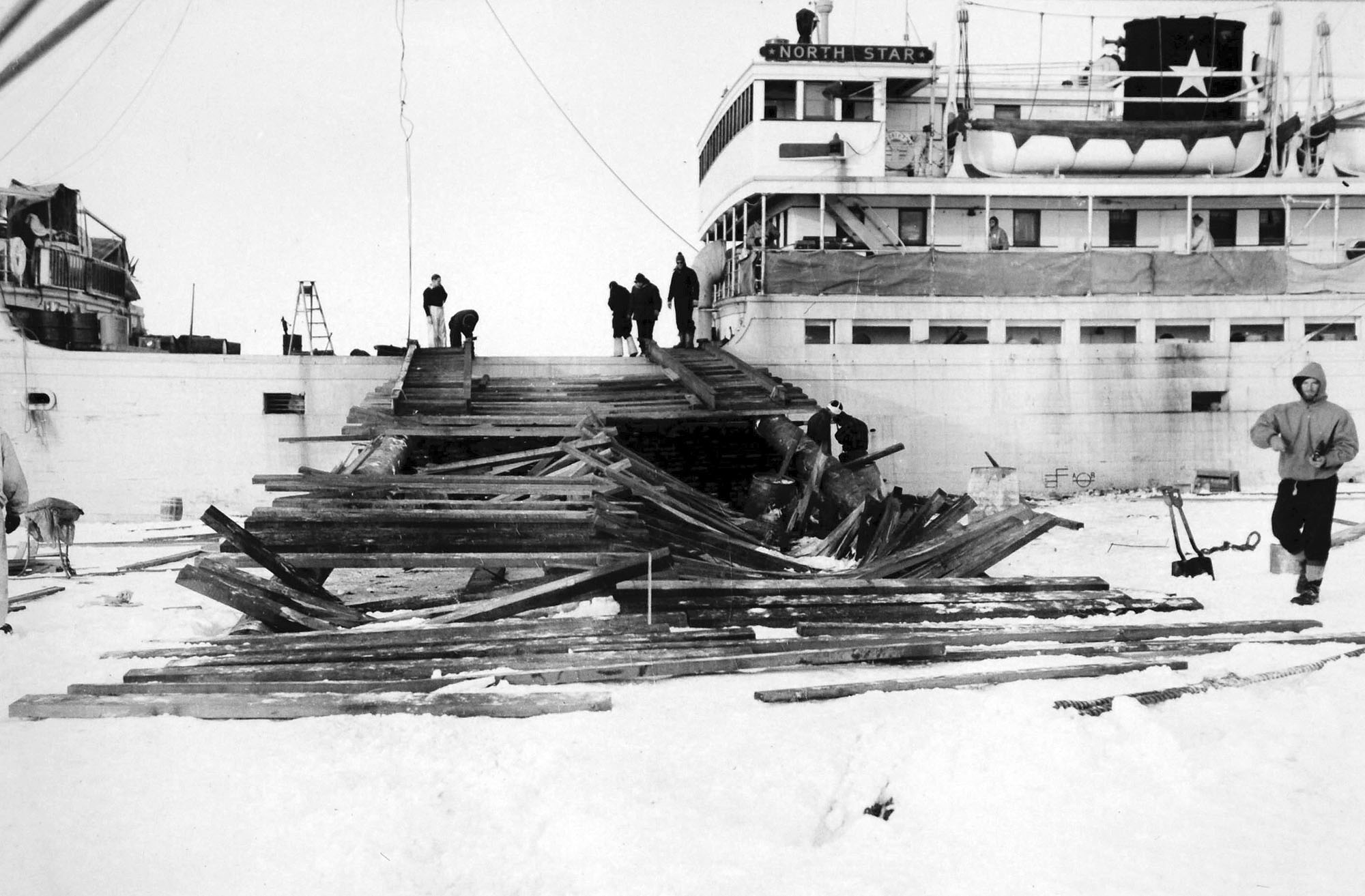
The Antarctic snow cruiser crushed its loading ramp while debarking North Star.

In 1939 Rear Admiral Richard E. Byrd mounted the United States Antarctic Service Expedition. The Department of the Interior was a cosponsor of the expedition, and contributed the use of North Star to the effort. The Bureau of Indian Affairs temporarily assigned the ship to the Division of Territories and Island Possessions, another unit of the Department of the Interior, on 15 September 1939. North Star's regular supply trips to the Arctic were taken over by commercial vessels, but at a cost roughly double that of North Star.

North Star sailed from Seattle on 20 September 1939, bound for Boston via the Panama Canal. She sailed with 44 malamute sled dogs which she had earlier carried from Alaska. The ship arrived in Boston on 16 October 1939. Given her regular service in the Arctic, North Star required comparatively little modification for the Antarctic. She was equipped with a gyrocompass, since at the extreme southern latitude of her destination her magnetic compass would not work. She was fitted with heavier cargo booms to handle some of Byrd's bulkier machines. She was also given awnings to protect her men and the dogs on deck from the tropical heat on her trip south.

On 15 November 1939 North Star sailed from Boston fully laden. She had on her deck the 27-ton Antarctic snow cruiser. Her freezer hold was packed with 11 tons of meat. Her cargo included 14 tons of sugar, 15.5 tons of flour, and 4 tons of lard. She stopped in Philadelphia to pick up yet more cargo and sailed off on 22 November 1939. She arrived at Cristobal, on the Atlantic side of the Panama Canal on 29 November 1939. Admiral Byrd went aboard North Star in Panama and sailed to Pitcairn Island, Wellington, and Dunedin, New Zealand. After refueling in New Zealand, Byrd and North Star went on to Antarctica, arriving at the Bay of Wales on 29 January 1940 after fighting through 600 miles of ice.

The ship was moored to a low spot on the Ross Ice Shelf. Several times during the ten days required to unload the ship, the ice to which she was moored broke off, forcing her to remoor at a different spot. The Antarctic snow cruiser crushed its loading ramp while driving off North Star's deck, but managed to reach the ice safely after full power was applied. After the unloading was complete, North Star sailed to Valparaiso, Chile, arriving there on 16 February 1940. She refueled, and took on 400 tons of supplies, a twin-engine airplane, and additional personnel. She sailed back to Antarctica on 23 February 1940. Instead of returning to "West Base" at the Bay of Wales, she sailed to "East Base" on Stonington Island. After unloading the supplies for the men intending to winter over, North Star sailed for the United States on 23 March 1940. She arrived in Seattle on 29 April 1940.

During the summer of 1940, North Star returned to her Bureau of Indian Affairs mission, and sailed north to Alaska on 8 June 1940. She was not done with Antarctic, however, for the men Byrd had left there to over winter had to be brought home. The ship sailed south from Seattle again on 10 December 1940. She stopped at Honolulu, and Dunedin, arriving back at the Bay of Wales on 24 January 1941. North Star embarked 24 men while USS Bear, Byrd's flagship, picked up 9. The two ships were blocked by ice from reaching the East Base, so the men had to be evacuated by air. North Star arrived in Punta Arenas, Chile on 25 March 1941. She docked in Boston with 35 men from the expedition, via Valparaiso and the Panama Canal, on 5 May 1941.

== U.S. Coast Guard (1941–1944) ==
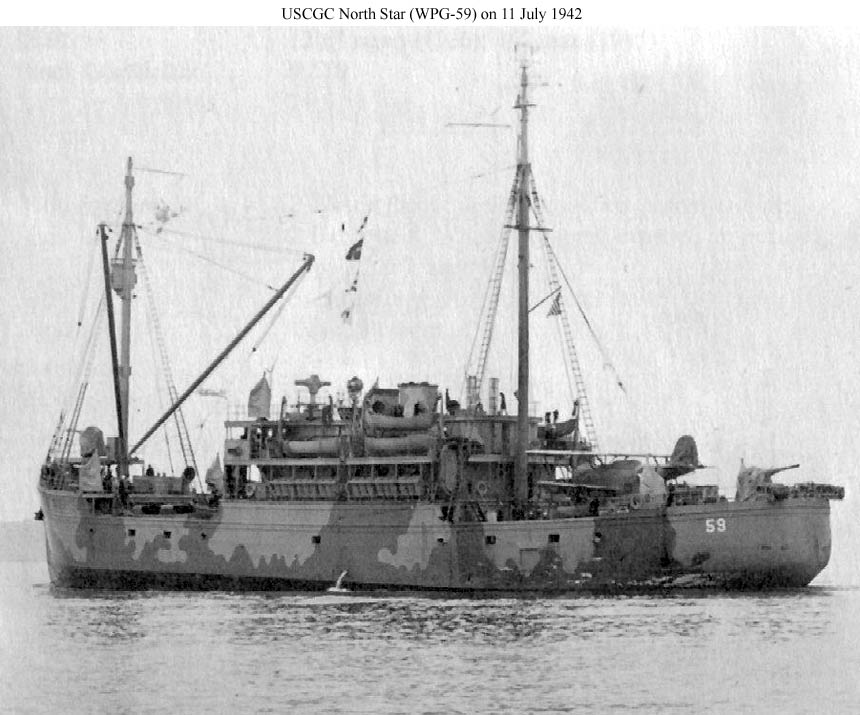
North Star in July 1942, at anchor at Boston

President Franklin D. Roosevelt declared America's neutrality in the growing European war on 5 September 1939. This was immediately followed by the creation of the "neutrality patrol," by air and naval forces off the U.S. coast. Its announced purpose was to safeguard shipping in the Western Hemisphere. By April 1941, Roosevelt had extended the patrol to 1,000 miles (1,600 km) offshore and publicly speculated that Nazi forces were already in Greenland.

In this environment of increased tension in northern waters, Admiral Byrd advocated transferring North Star to the military. The ship was reassigned from the Bureau of Indian Affairs to the United States Coast Guard. She was commissioned USCGC North Star on 14 May 1941, and given the pennant number WPG-59. Workers began her conversion into a warship, and her Coast Guard crew began reporting aboard that day.

North Star was dry-docked, overhauled, and degaussed at the Boston Navy Yard immediately after her commissioning. She took on a Grumman J2F-4 Duck floatplane (BuNo 1667). She was equipped with .50 caliber and .30 caliber machine guns, and two 3"/50 guns, one on the bow and one on the stern. Her crew was dramatically increased with as many as 17 officers and 116 men aboard at one time. On 1 July 1941 she unmoored from the Navy Yard and sailed into the Atlantic to join the neutrality patrol.

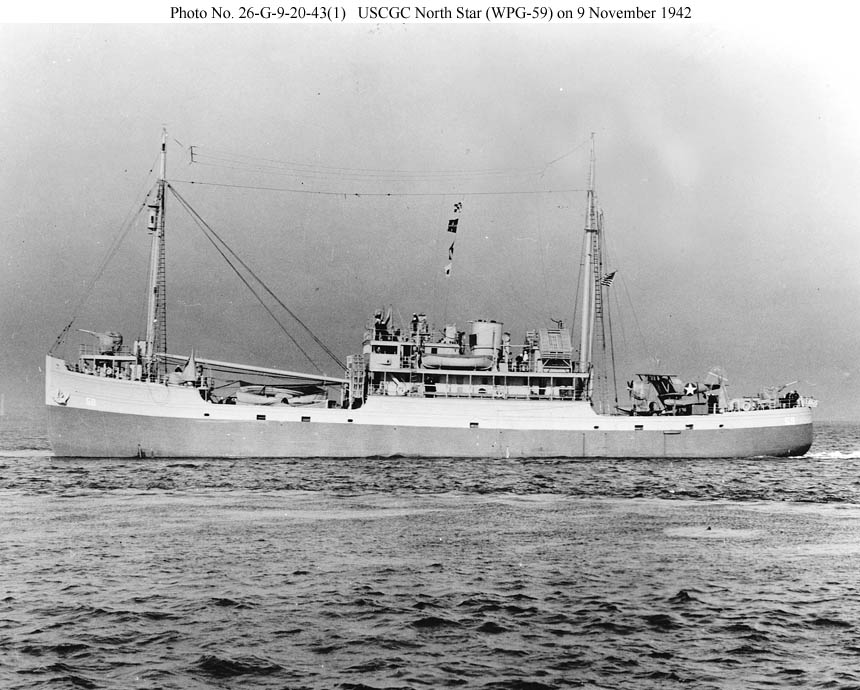
North Star in November 1942, just after leaving the Boston Navy Yard

On 9 July 1941, the same day the Nazis invaded Denmark, the United States-Greenland agreement was signed, in accordance with understandings reached at the 1940 Havana Conference. This provided for the defense of the island by American forces. North Star was assigned to the Northeast Greenland Patrol, which was consolidated with the South Greenland Parol into the Greenland Patrol in October 1941. Based in Boston, the Greenland Patrol was designated Task Force 24.8 of the U.S. Atlantic Fleet. North Star patrolled along the east coast of Greenland transporting people, mail, fuel, and supplies among the isolated bases and settlements. She sent armed detachments ashore to examine potential Nazi bases. She launched her float plane to patrol over the coast. North Star challenged any aircraft or ship that she sighted, but there were very few in this remote area. The ship escorted merchantmen and provided light ice-breaking for them.

North Star reached Ivigtut, Greenland on 10 July 1941. The Governor of North Greenland, Eske Brun, joined her at Godthaab and sailed to Julieanehaab in July 1941. The ship motored on to Videnskabelig Station, on Ella Island, a U.S. Navy radio and weather station on the east coast of Greenland. In August 1941, North Star sailed to Reykjavik, Iceland, which had also been occupied by the United States. There she was able to refuel and take on aviation gas from USS Sagamon. North Star sailed back to Greenland, anchoring in Kaiser Franz Joseph Fjord.

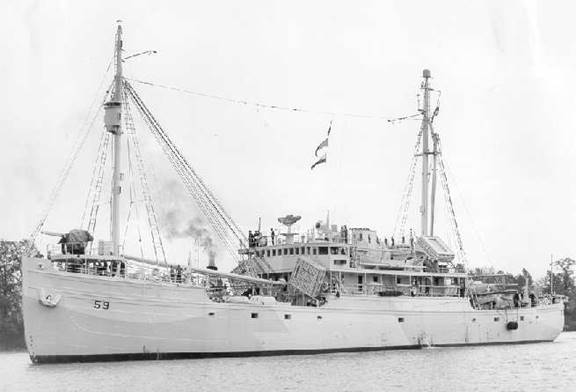
North Star in May 1943, just after her refit at the Coast Guard Yard

In September 1941, North Star landing parties seized a number of Norwegians and their equipment. Since Norway had been occupied by the Nazis the previous year, there was concern that these might be sending weather information to Germany. She encountered the Norwegian steamer Buskø, which was dispatched to the Norwegian hunting stations along the coast by the Nazi government in control of Norway, and cooperated with USCGC Northland to seize the vessel. North Star ended September 1941 back in Reykjavik where she received mail and provisions from USS Tarazed, and fuel and water from the Anglo-Saxon Petroleum Company tanker MV Cliona. In early August, mechanics from USS Vulcan installed a depth charge rack on the stern of the vessel which held 300-pound depth charges. Vulcan mechanics also repaired the ship's anchor windlass and gyrocompass. At the beginning of October 1941 she sailed back to Greenland, escorting S.S. Alcedo to Angmagssalik. She spent the rest of the fall along the coast of Greenland, finally sailing for the United States in December. She moored at the Boston Navy Yard on 23 December 1941.

In January and February 1942 North Star was dry-docked and overhauled at the Boston Navy Yard. She got underway for Greenland again on 14 March 1942. She stopped in Casco Bay, Maine, and Placentia Sound, Newfoundland, arriving at Narsarsuaq Army Base on 3 April 1942. She patrolled the coast of Greenland continuously in early 1942, surveying, transporting people, and delivering supplies. A persistent leak in her lower chain locker, caused by collisions with ice, required pumping every watch. North Star returned to Boston on 20 June 1942 and entered dry-dock at the Boston Navy Yard that same day to repair her hull. She sailed from Boston again on 12 July 1942 and encountered what she thought was a submarine, which she attacked with no obvious result. On her way back to Greenland, where she arrived on 26 July 1942, she stopped at Casco Bay and Sydney, Nova Scotia. After patrolling the coast of Greenland, she returned to Boston on 17 October 1942, stopping at Sydney enroute. Once again at the Boston Navy Yard, the ship was dry-docked and underwent extensive repairs to her engines, rudder, rudder post, propeller, wiring, bilge keel, plumbing, and other systems. During one of her yard visits in 1942, she had 20 mm guns installed, replacing some of her machine guns. After her maintenance was complete, North Star sailed back to Greenland via Casco Bay and Sydney, arriving in late November. She spent Christmas Day 1942 moored at the Army dock at Bluie West One, in Narsarsuaq.

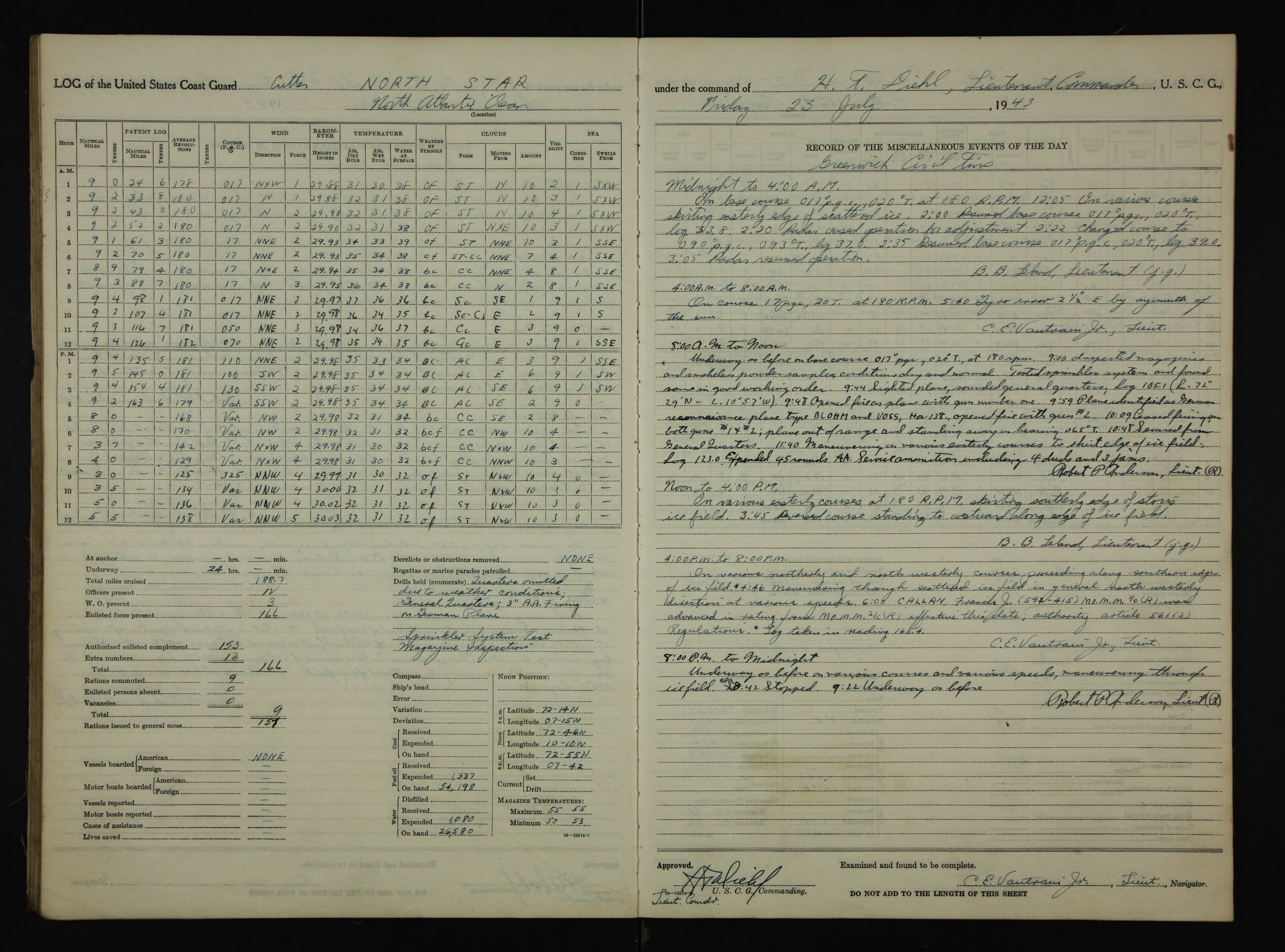
Log from 23 July 1943 describing North Star's interaction with a German plane

In early 1943, North Star continued her supply, transportation, and patrol activities around Greenland, enduring periodic bouts of sea ice and hurricane-force winds. She returned to Boston on 31 March 1943, after a stop in Argentia, Newfoundland. North Star reached the Coast Guard Yard on 9 April 1943. Along with the regular main engine, generator, and hull maintenance, the ship received updated electronics including a new radar set, ET-8019-A and ET-8010-C radio telegraph transmitters, and an RC-123 receiver. Four of the ships boats received work, including two 26-foot Monomony surfboats, a self-bailing surfboat, and a 26.5 foot motor launch.

North Star returned to Boston on 16 May 1943, and from there reached Greenland, via Casco Bay and Argentia, on 9 June 1943. Within the week she was dispatched to search for survivors of the sunken USCGC Escanaba, but found no sign of them. She continued her activities around Greenland, and briefly visited Reykjavik, where she refueled from the barge Gauger (YO-55), and dry-docked to repair hull damage from ice. On her way back to Greenland, North Star sighted a BV 138 German reconnaissance aircraft northwest of Jan Mayen Island on 23 July 1943. She fired 45 rounds from her 3" guns at the plane, which flew off. Shortly after this incident, she was engulfed in pack ice for a month and had 12 feet of her port bilge keel ripped off her hull, and her rudder damaged. She finally reached port at Gael Hamke Bay in tow of a Norwegian trawler, Polar Bjorn. After delivering her supplies, her crew managed to temporarily fix her rudder, and she sailed back to Reykjavik for another dry-dock to repair her ice damage. North Star returned to Narsarsuaq for the last time in late September 1943, and sailed on to Boston, where she arrived on 18 October 1943. The ship received another round of hull repairs in dry-dock, and other maintenance at the Boston Navy Yard.

The ship was decommissioned by the Coast Guard on 13 January 1944 at the Boston Navy Yard, and transferred to the U.S. Navy.

== U.S. Navy (1944–1945) ==
North Star was placed in reduced commission by the US Navy on 15 January 1944 and given the new pennant number IX-148. She became a test bed for a post-war planning team that was developing practices to mothball the many U.S. Navy ships which were expected to be decommissioned at the end of World War II. The "North Star Group" as this team became known, produced policies and procedures for the reserve fleet.

USS North Star sailed from Boston on 3 May 1944 and arrived at the reserve basin at the Philadelphia Navy Yard on 6 May 1944. The ship was transferred to the 13th Naval District in February 1945 and sailed for her old home port of Seattle. In preparation for her decommissioning, the ship was dry-docked and demilitarized at the Lake Union Drydock and Machine Works on 22 April 1945. She was decommissioned on 15 June 1945 at Seattle and returned to the Department of the Interior on 18 June 1945

== U.S. Bureau of Indian Affairs (1945–1951) ==
The Bureau of Indian Affairs placed North Star on her old task of supplying its transportation needs to the Alaska native community, but the dramatic expansion of activity in Alaska after World War II found her too small for her job. The Alaska Native Service was given the much larger freighter Coastal Rider by the U.S. Maritime Commission as a replacement. She was given a reinforced bow to deal with Arctic ice at the Todd Shipyard in Seattle. North Star's captain, crew, and even her fuel oil were transferred to the converted ship which was renamed North Star II in the summer of 1949

On 13 March 1951 the Alaska Native Service opened bids to purchase North Star. There were three bids, the highest of which was $108,000 submitted by Western Boat Building Company of Tacoma.

== Commercial service (1951–?) ==
North Star was converted into a mother ship for the Alaskan fishery by Western Boat Building Company in the spring of 1951. The cost of this conversion was reported to be $500,000. Her refrigeration and freezer plant combined with her cargo carrying capacity produced a new business model for the Alaskan fishing fleet. She carried sixteen 32-foot (9.8m) gill net fishing boats on her deck. These would bring their catch to North Star for cold storage and delivery to market. The ship began her first fishing trip to Bristol Bay in June 1951. In 1954 North Star was chartered to the Van Camp Seafood Company, which used her to freeze tuna caught near Pago Pago. By the summer of 1955, North Star was once again supporting the fishing fleet in Alaska.

Sometime around 1958 North Star was laid up in Lake Washington. She was sold to Edward Colberg in late 1967. He intended to use the ship as a coastal freighter in Mexico. In March 1968 she was towed to Long Beach, California for refitting. She was dry-docked at the California Shipbuilding Company yard. Federal records show that North Star was reflagged as a Mexican vessel sometime in late 1968 or early 1969. Her ultimate fate is unknown.

== Awards ==
- United States Antarctic Expedition Medal
- American Defense Service Medal with "A" device
- American Campaign Medal
- European-African-Middle Eastern Campaign Medal with one battle star
- World War II Victory Medal
