= VintageAirRally =

The VintageAirRally (also known as Vintage Air Rally) is a biennial vintage airplane rally across thousands of miles of challenging terrain, created by Prepare2go.

The aim is to run rallies that are available to all, regardless of nationality, personal circumstances or any other factor.

== The Crete2Cape Edition (2016) ==
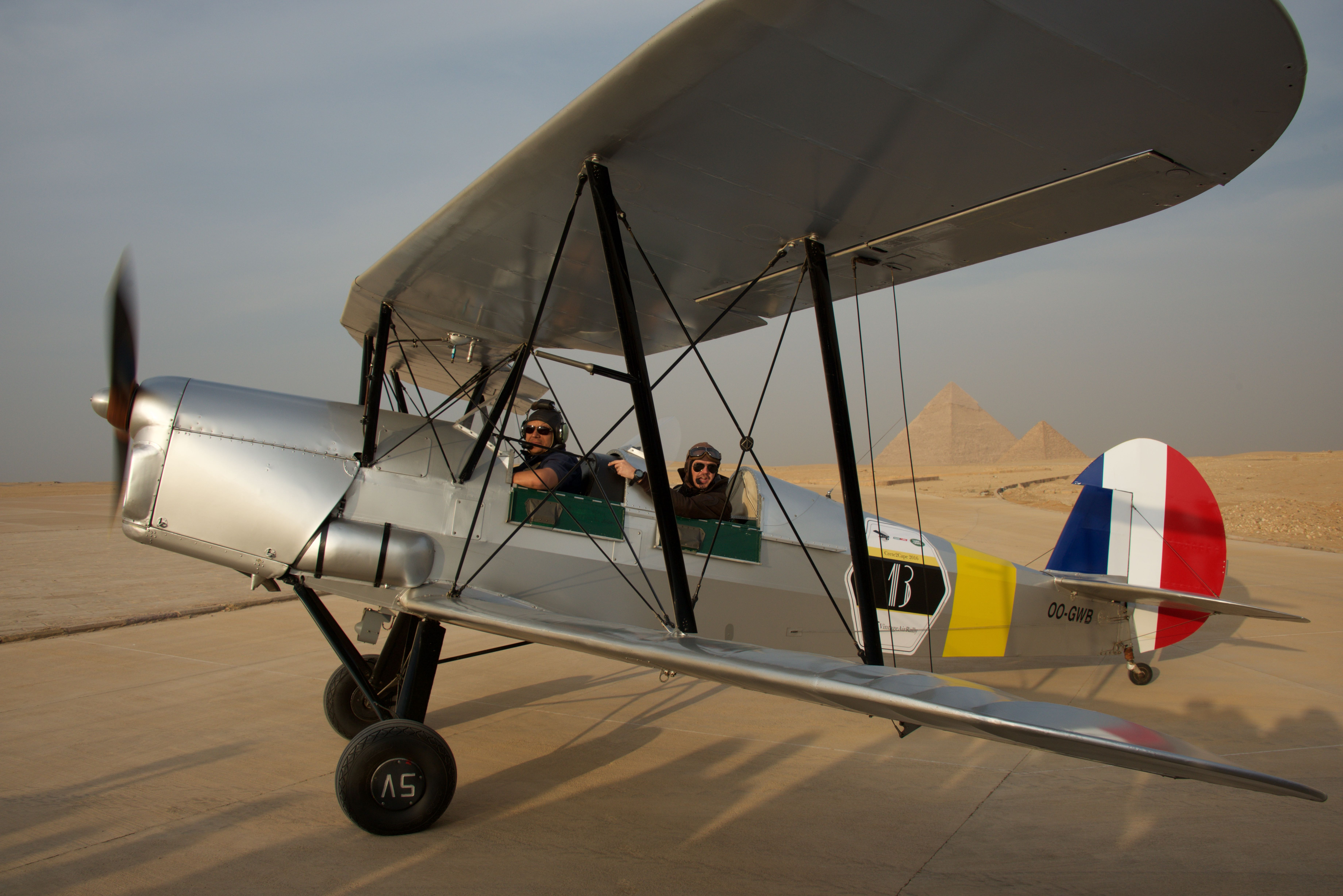
The Franco-Belgian Team in a Stampe SV4 at Giza Pyramids, VintageAirRally 2016

The Crete2Cape edition of the VintageAirRally covered the Eastern side of the African continent, traversing Egypt, Sudan, Ethiopia, Kenya, Tanzania, Zambia, Zanzibar, Zimbabwe, Botswana, & South Africa. The Rally ran from 12 November 2016 to 17 December 2016 covering over 8,000 miles.

== The Buzet Edition, Belgium (2017) ==
The Belgian edition of the VintageAirRally ran around southern Belgium on 20 May 2017, and it is planned to have a third edition in 2021. The rally route took in 3 airfields and microlight strips with teams of cars and biplanes in competition.

== The Montreal Edition (2017) ==
The Montreal edition of the VintageAirRally ran on 1 July 2017. The rally route took in several airfields and bush strips around the city.

== The Greenland Trophy (2018, repetition planned 2020, 21, 22) ==
The world's northernmost STOL competition, held annually in Narsarsuaq, Greenland.

== The Dunkirk2Dover (2018, postponed to 2022) ==
This edition of the VintageAirRally will run 9–12 May 2018. The rally route starts at Dunkerque – Les Moëres Airport and stops at Walmer Aerodrome and Walmer Castle en route for the FINISH at Chilston Park. An Airco DH.9 will be the first aeroplane to land at Walmer Aerodrome since 1919 (the last plane out was a DH9).

== The Zoute Air Trophy at Knokke-Heist (2018) ==
This VintageAirRally Beach STOL Competition ran 14–17 June 2018 at Knokke-Heist in Belgium. It has been named the Zoute Air Trophy, and is planned to become an annual event. The beach was converted into a temporary international airport, historically linking back 50 years to Knokke-Zoute Airfield.

== The Ushuaia2USA Edition (2018, which is postponed to 2024) ==
The Ushuaia2USA edition of the VintageAirRally will run from the southernmost tip of South America to North America in the last quarter of 2018. Leaving Ushuaia Argentina on 1 November, arriving in United States on 14 December. The route takes in 19 countries in South America and Central America. This will be the first edition of the VintageAirRally where there is no entry fee for the teams – all costs are covered by the sponsors. This will allow access to those to whom previously taking part was impossible.
