= Narsarsuaq Air Base =

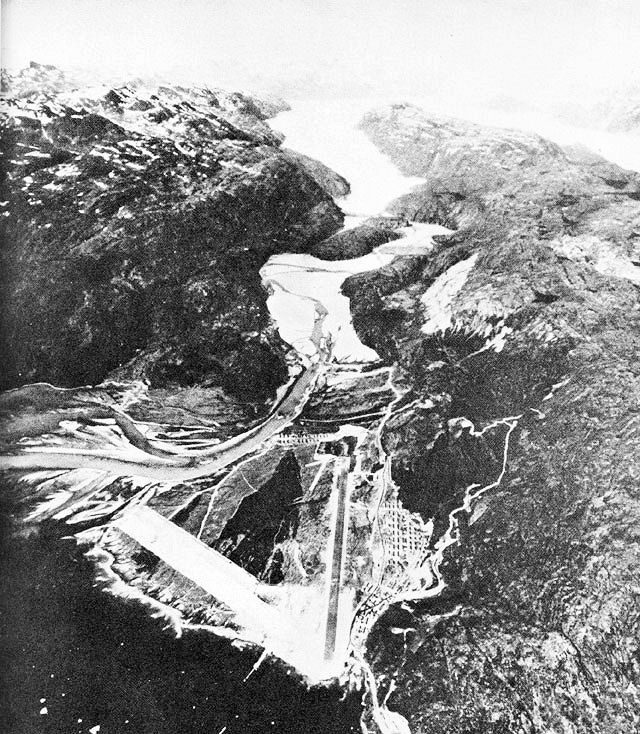
- Bluie West One in June 1942

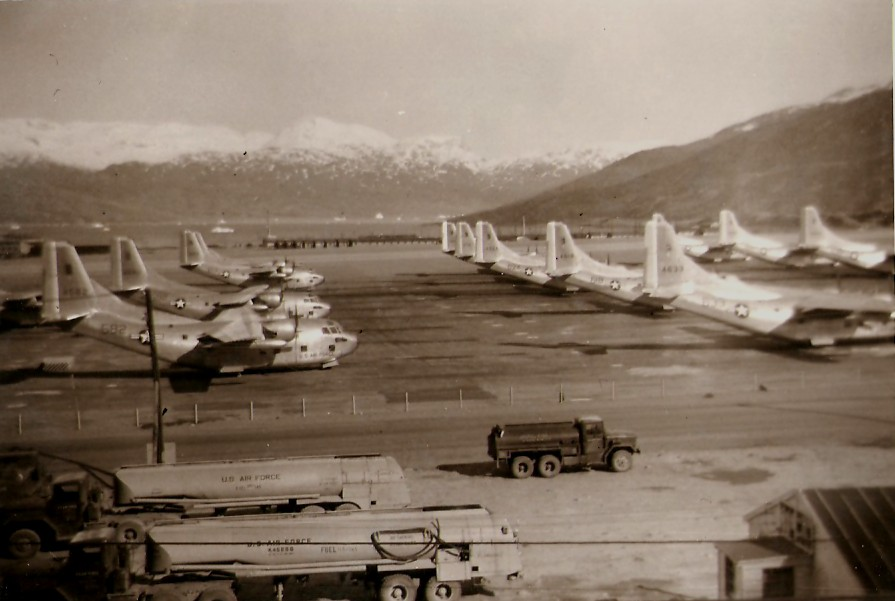
- Narsarssuak Air Base in 1956
- IATA: UAK; ICAO: BGBW

Summary
- Location: Narsarsuaq, near the southern tip of Greenland
- In use: 1942–1958
- Elevation AMSL: 112 ft (34 m)
- Coordinates: 61°9′38.29″N 45°25′33.16″W
- Interactive map of Narsarsuaq Air Base

Runways
Direction	Length		Surface
Direction	ft	m	Surface
07/25	6,000	1,835	concrete
17/35	4,300	1,300	gravel

Bluie West One, later known as Narsarsuaq Air Base and Narsarsuaq Airport, was built on a glacial moraine at what is now the village of Narsarsuaq, near the southern tip of Greenland. Construction by the United States Army began in June 1941. The first aircraft landed there in January 1942, as a link in the North Atlantic air ferry route in World War II. The base had a peak population of about 4,000 American servicemen, and it is estimated that some 10,000 aircraft landed there en route to the war in Europe and North Africa.

Soon after the United States entered the war, the War Department decided to deploy Major General Carl Spaatz's Eighth Air Force to Britain, putting the North Atlantic ferry route facilities constructed by the Corps to an early test. Radioing from Bluie West One, while crossing the Atlantic in mid-June 1942, Spaatz ordered the movement to begin. The P-38 and P-39 fighters, piloted by combat crews who had been given special training in long-distance flying, were escorted by the longer-range B-17 bombers.

With stops at the Canadian-built base at Goose Bay in Labrador, Bluie West One in Southern Greenland, and Reykjavík or Keflavik in Iceland, the aircraft could fly from the new Presque Isle Army Airfield in northern Maine to Prestwick Airport in Scotland with no leg of the journey longer than 1,370 km (740 nmi; 850 mi). Other important bases in Greenland were Bluie West Eight near the present-day town of Kangerlussuaq, and Bluie East One on the almost-uninhabited east coast.

Bad weather is frequent in Southern Greenland, and Narsarsuaq is virtually surrounded by high mountains, making the approach to the steel-mat runway exceedingly difficult. The usual approach was a low-level flight up a fjord. Because the runway slopes up west to east, landings were (and still are predominantly) made to the east, with take-offs to the west, regardless of the wind direction.

BW-1's importance declined post World War II, but the U.S. Air Force maintained it as Narsarsuaq Air Base during the early Cold War years, when it served as a refuelling station for jet fighters and for helicopters crossing the North Atlantic. The runway by this time had been paved with concrete. Jets require a longer take-off run than do propeller-driven aircraft, and the air base used a small tugboat to move icebergs out of the way of planes taking off over the basin west of the runway. There is a detailed account of a visit to BW-1 in the early days of World War II by Ernest K. Gann, in the book Fate Is the Hunter.

The advent of aerial refueling, and the opening of the larger Thule Air Base (now named Pituffik Space Base) in northern Greenland, made the base redundant, and it was turned over to the Danish government of Greenland in 1958. It is currently known as Narsarsuaq Airport and served by regular flights from Reykjavík, Iceland, during the summer season, as well as by commuter aircraft from Kangerlussuaq and other Greenlandic airfields. There is no control tower, and ceiling is required, on all approach procedures.
