= Innaarsuit =

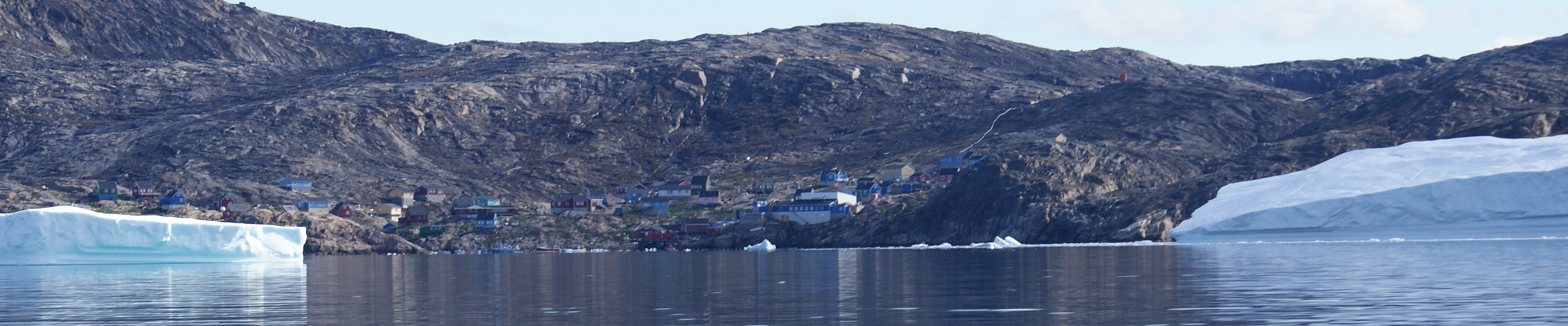
- Innaarsuit

- Location within Greenland
- Coordinates: 73°12′00″N 56°00′40″W
- State: Kingdom of Denmark
- Constituent country: Greenland
- Municipality: Avannaata

Government
  - Mayor: Susanne Kristensen Eliassen

Population (1 January 2025)
  - Total: 148
- Time zone: UTC−02:00 (Western Greenland Time)
  - Summer (DST): UTC−01:00 (Western Greenland Summer Time)
- Postal code: 3962 Upernavik

Innaarsuit (old spelling: Ivnârssuit) is an island settlement in Avannaata municipality in northwestern Greenland, located on an island of the same name. the settlement had 148 inhabitants in 2025.

== Upernavik Archipelago ==
Innaarsuit within the Upernavik Archipelago

Innaarsuit is located within Upernavik Archipelago, a vast archipelago of small islands on the coast of northeastern Baffin Bay. The archipelago extends from the northwestern coast of Sigguup Nunaa peninsula in the south at approximately 71°50′N 56°00′W to the southern end of Melville Bay (Greenlandic: Qimusseriarsuaq) in the north at approximately 74°50′N 57°30′W.

== Infrastructure ==
The settlement has grown up around the harbour, which lies in a natural bay on the island's west coast, where boats can lie sheltered from the wind. At the harbour, which has a jetty with a quay length of nine meters and a water depth of two metres, are the village's commercial areas and a smaller central area with the common service facilities such as includes service center, branch office, village consultation, chapel and school. Childcare takes place in day care. There is a Pilersuisoq shop which supplies the residents with food and other necessary items.

The electricity supply is based on a diesel-powered municipal plant and the heat supply by an oil boiler. In 2002, a 750 meter water mains network was established in connection with 3 new tap houses and the supply of water to the production facilities. The water supply is based on surface water. The night renovation takes place by collecting bags, which are emptied into the sea.

=== Education ===
Innaarsuit does not have an assembly hall, but the hall in the service building forms the overall framework for the settlement's cultural and leisure life. The children are taught in the primary school "Fiilimuup Atuarfia", which has room for 25 students from 1st to 8th grade. One teacher and four substitutes are employed. The school is housed in buildings that were extended and renovated in 1992. The school is also used as a church.

== Economy ==
The harbor and the center area are surrounded by a residential area with scattered single-family houses. The village's business base is fishing and catching whales and seals. Halibut fishing in particular is an important source of income. Royal Greenland has a department in the settlement that butchers and freezes halibut.

== Population ==
Innaarsuit is one of the few settlements in Avannaata municipality exhibiting significant growth patterns over the course of the last two decades, increasing by nearly half relative to 1990 levels, similarly to other settlements in the northern half of the archipelago: Kullorsuaq, and Tasiusaq.

The settlement was established around 1911. Until 1950, the settlement had only 30 inhabitants, but after that the number has been increasing. The island's highest point is the 310 meter high mountain Saattup Akia.

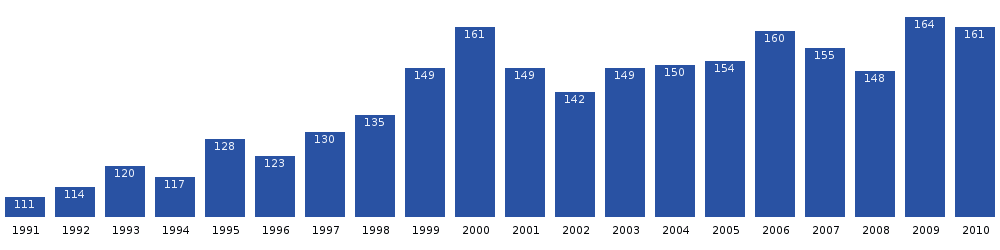
Innaarsuit population growth dynamics in the last two decades. Source: Statistics Greenland

== Transport ==
During weekdays Air Greenland serves the village as part of government contract, with flights from Innaarsuit Heliport to Tasiusaq Heliport and to Upernavik Airport.

== Iceberg Incidents ==
In July 2018, an unusually large iceberg appeared off the shore of Innaarsuit. Some residents were evacuated in case the iceberg calved causing a wave that could swamp the settlement.

In July 2025, another huge iceberg drifted very close to the village’s harbour. The iceberg was in position for at least a week and authorities warned people to stay away from it due to fears of a collision or that it could break apart.
