= Ilimanaq Heliport =

Heliport in Greenland

- IATA: none; ICAO: BGIL

Summary
- Airport type: Public
- Operator: Greenland Airport Authority (Mittarfeqarfiit)
- Serves: Ilimanaq, Greenland
- Elevation AMSL: 52 ft / 16 m
- Coordinates: 69°04′56″N 051°06′31″W
- Website: Ilimanaq Heliport

Map
- Location in Greenland

Helipads
Number	Length		Surface
Number	m	ft	Surface
1	30 × 20	98 × 66	Grass
- Source: Danish AIS

Ilimanaq Heliport (ICAO: BGIL) is a heliport in Ilimanaq, a village located just south of Ilulissat Icefjord in Avannaata municipality in western Greenland. The heliport is considered a helistop, and is served by Air Greenland as part of a government contract.

== Airlines and destinations ==
Airlines	Destinations
Air Greenland (settlement flights)	Seasonal: Ilulissat
