= UPK =

UPK may refer to:

- University Press of Kansas, an academic publisher
- University Press of Kentucky, an academic publisher
- UPK, LID code for Upernavik Kujalleq Heliport, Avannaata municipality, Greenland
- User Productivity Kit, part of the Oracle Applications software
- Universal Pre-Kindergarten, alternate term for Universal preschool
