= Qaanaaq Airport =

Airport in Avannaata, Greenland

Qaanaaq Airport Mittarfik Qaanaaq / Thule Lufthavn
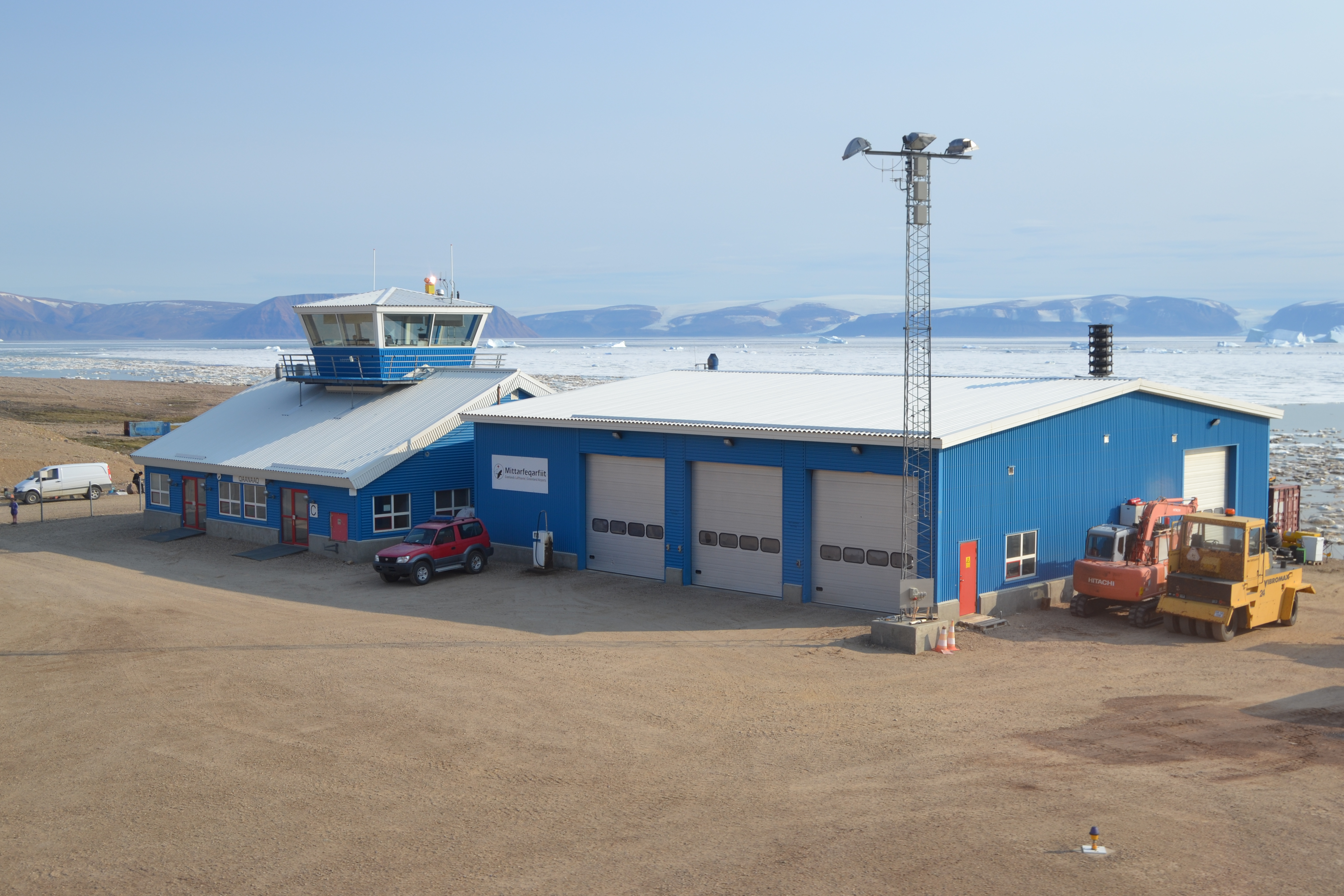
- IATA: NAQ; ICAO: BGQQ

Summary
- Airport type: Public
- Operator: Greenland Airport Authority (Mittarfeqarfiit)
- Serves: Qaanaaq, Greenland
- Opened: 2001
- Elevation AMSL: 51 ft / 16 m
- Coordinates: 77°29′19″N 069°23′19″W
- Website: Qaanaaq Airport

Map
- Location in Greenland

Runways
Direction	Length		Surface
Direction	m	ft	Surface
17/35	900	2,953	Gravel

Statistics (2012)
- Passengers: 1,719
- Source: Danish AIS

Qaanaaq Airport (Greenlandic: Mittarfik Qaanaaq; Danish: Thule Lufthavn) (IATA: NAQ, ICAO: BGQQ) is an airport located 1.9 NM (3.5 km; 2.2 mi) northwest of Qaanaaq, a settlement in the Avannaata municipality in northern Greenland. It was established in 2001 to serve Qaanaaq and neighboring communities because Thule Air Base in Pituffik is not open for regular passenger traffic. It is the only civilian airport north of Upernavik and is a lifeline for northern Greenland. Fresh food and other consumer products are transported by air.

== Airlines and destinations ==
Airlines	Destinations
Air Greenland	Moriusaq, Siorapaluk, Thule, Upernavik; Seasonal: Ilulissat

=== Transfers at Thule Air Base ===
Travellers bound for Thule Air Base in Pituffik are required to apply for transfer permit from either Rigsombudsmanden in Nuuk (residents of Greenland), or the Danish Foreign Ministry (all others). Failure to present the permit during check-in results in denial of boarding. The same rules apply for transfers at Pituffik, including a stopover on the way from Qaanaaq to Savissivik. Travel from Upernavik (with connections from southwest Greenland) to Qaanaaq is not influenced.
