= Qeqertaq Heliport =

Heliport in Greenland

- IATA: PQT; ICAO: BGQE; LID: QQT

Summary
- Airport type: Public
- Operator: Greenland Airport Authority (Mittarfeqarfiit)
- Serves: Qeqertaq, Greenland
- Elevation AMSL: 69 ft / 21 m
- Coordinates: 69°59′58″N 051°18′15″W
- Website: Qeqertaq Heliport

Map
- Location in Greenland

Helipads
Number	Length		Surface
Number	m	ft	Surface
1	15	49	Gravel
- Source: Danish AIS

Qeqertaq Heliport (IATA: PQT, ICAO: BGQE) is a heliport in Qeqertaq, a village on an island off the shore of the Nuussuaq Peninsula in Avannaata municipality in western Greenland. The heliport is considered a helistop, and is served by Air Greenland as part of a government contract.

== Airlines and destinations ==
Airlines	Destinations
Air Greenland (settlement flights)	Seasonal: Ilulissat
