= Nuussuaq Heliport =

Heliport in Greenland

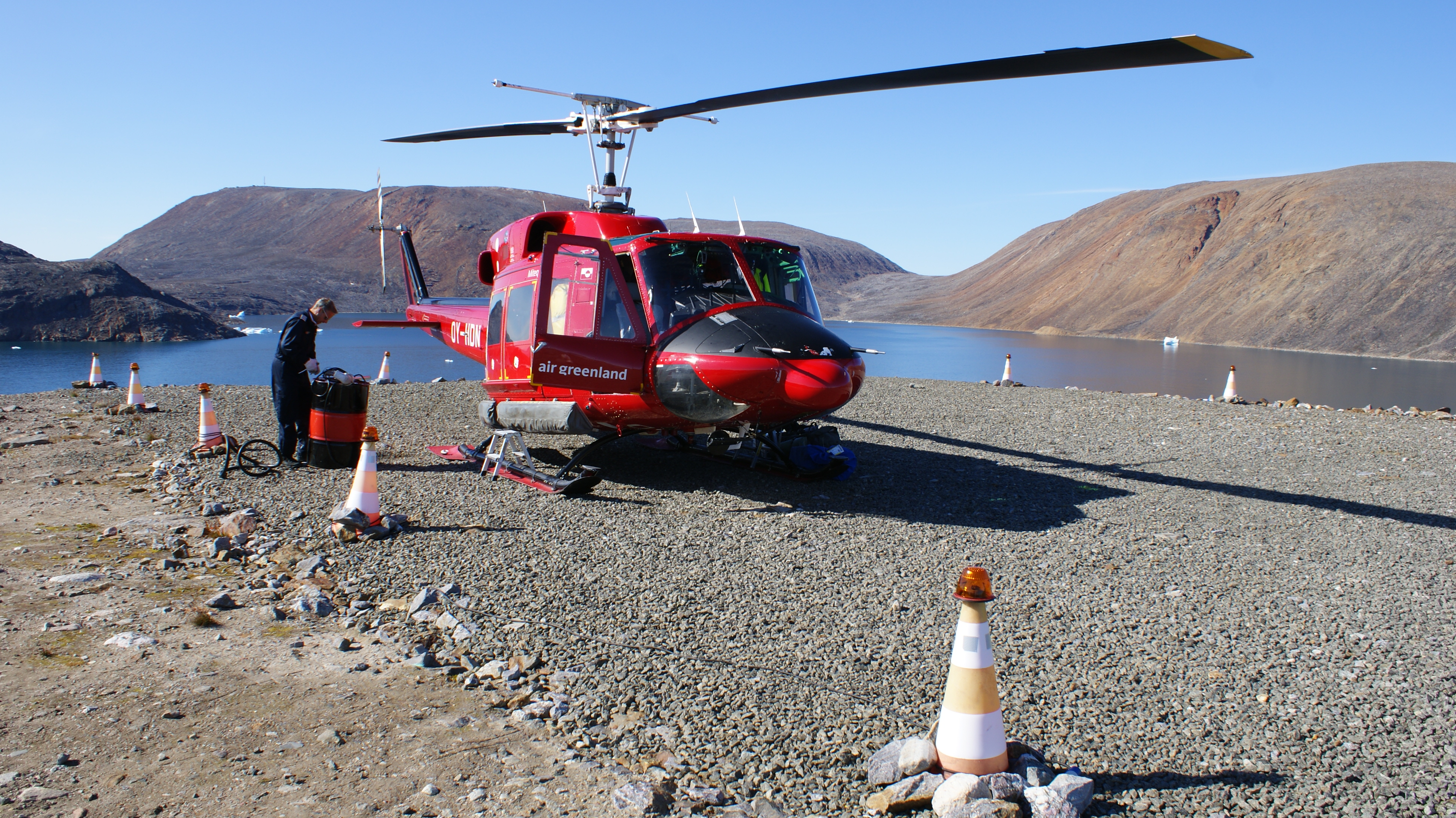
- Air Greenland Bell 212 Miteq at Nuussuaq Heliport
- IATA: NSQ; ICAO: BGNU

Summary
- Airport type: Public
- Operator: Greenland Airport Authority (Mittarfeqarfiit)
- Serves: Nuussuaq, Greenland
- Elevation AMSL: 184 ft / 56 m
- Coordinates: 74°06′35″N 057°03′54″W
- Website: Nuussuaq Heliport

Map
- Location in Greenland

Helipads
Number	Length		Surface
Number	m	ft	Surface
1	30 by 20	98 × 66	Gravel
- Source: Danish AIS

Nuussuaq Heliport (IATA: NSQ, ICAO: BGNU) is a heliport in Nuussuaq, a village in the Upernavik Archipelago of Avannaata municipality in northwestern Greenland. The heliport is considered a helistop, and is served by Air Greenland as part of a government contract.

== Airlines and destinations ==
Airlines	Destinations
Air Greenland (settlement flights)	Kullorsuaq, Upernavik
