= JGO =

JGO may refer to:

- Jupiter Ganymede Orbiter, a proposed European space probe
- Jetsgo, a defunct airline of Canada
- JetGo, an Australian regional airline
- Ngomba language, a Grassfields language of Cameroon
- Qeqertarsuaq Heliport, in Greenland
- Jenniffer González-Colón, governor of Puerto Rico
