= KHQ (disambiguation) =

The KHQ Television Group is a local media organization based in Spokane, Washington, U.S., and a subsidiary of the Cowles Company.

KHQ or khq may also refer to:

- WKHQ-FM, radio station in Charlevoix, Michigan, U.S.
- Koyra Chiini language, Songhai language of Mali
- Kullorsuaq Heliport, heliport in Kullorsuaq, Greenland
