= Tasiusaq, Avannaata =

Place in Greenland, Kingdom of Denmark

Tasiusaq
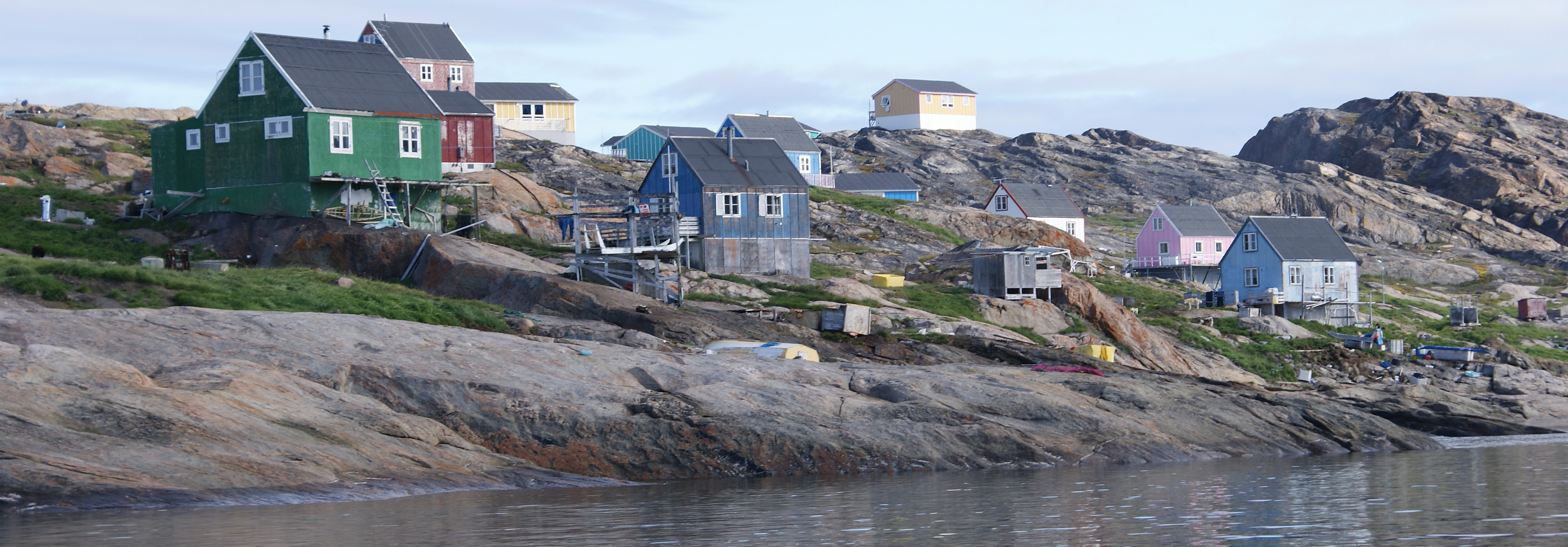
- Wooden houses in Tasiusaq

- Location within Greenland
- Coordinates: 73°22′08″N 56°03′20″W
- State: Kingdom of Denmark
- Autonomous territory: Greenland
- Municipality: Avannaata

Population (2020)
  - Total: 252
- Time zone: UTC−02:00 (Western Greenland Time)
  - Summer (DST): UTC−01:00 (Western Greenland Summer Time)
- Postal code: 3962 Upernavik

Tasiusaq is an island settlement in the Avannaata municipality in northwestern Greenland. It had 252 inhabitants in 2020. In Kalaallisut, the name means "looks like a lake".

== Upernavik Archipelago ==
Tasiusaq within the Upernavik Archipelago

Tasiusaq is located on Tasiusaq Island within Upernavik Archipelago, a vast archipelago of small islands on the coast of northeastern Baffin Bay. The archipelago extends from the northwestern coast of Sigguup Nunaa peninsula in the south at approximately 71°50′N 56°00′W to the southern end of Melville Bay (Greenlandic: Qimusseriarsuaq) in the north at approximately 74°50′N 57°30′W.

== Population ==
Tasiusaq is one of the few settlements in the Avannaata municipality exhibiting significant growth patterns over the course of the last two decades, increasing by nearly half relative to the 1990 levels and by over 7 percent relative to the 2000 levels.

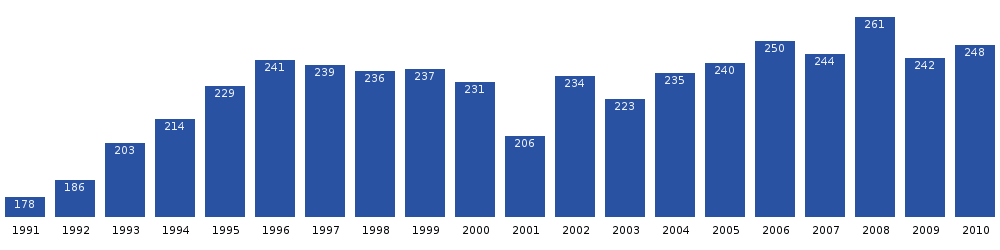
Tasiusaq population growth dynamics in the last two decades. Source: Statistics Greenland

== Transport ==
During weekdays Air Greenland serves the village as part of government contract, with flights from Tasiusaq Heliport to Innaarsuit Heliport and to Upernavik Airport.
