= Ilimanaq =

Ilimanaq Claushavn
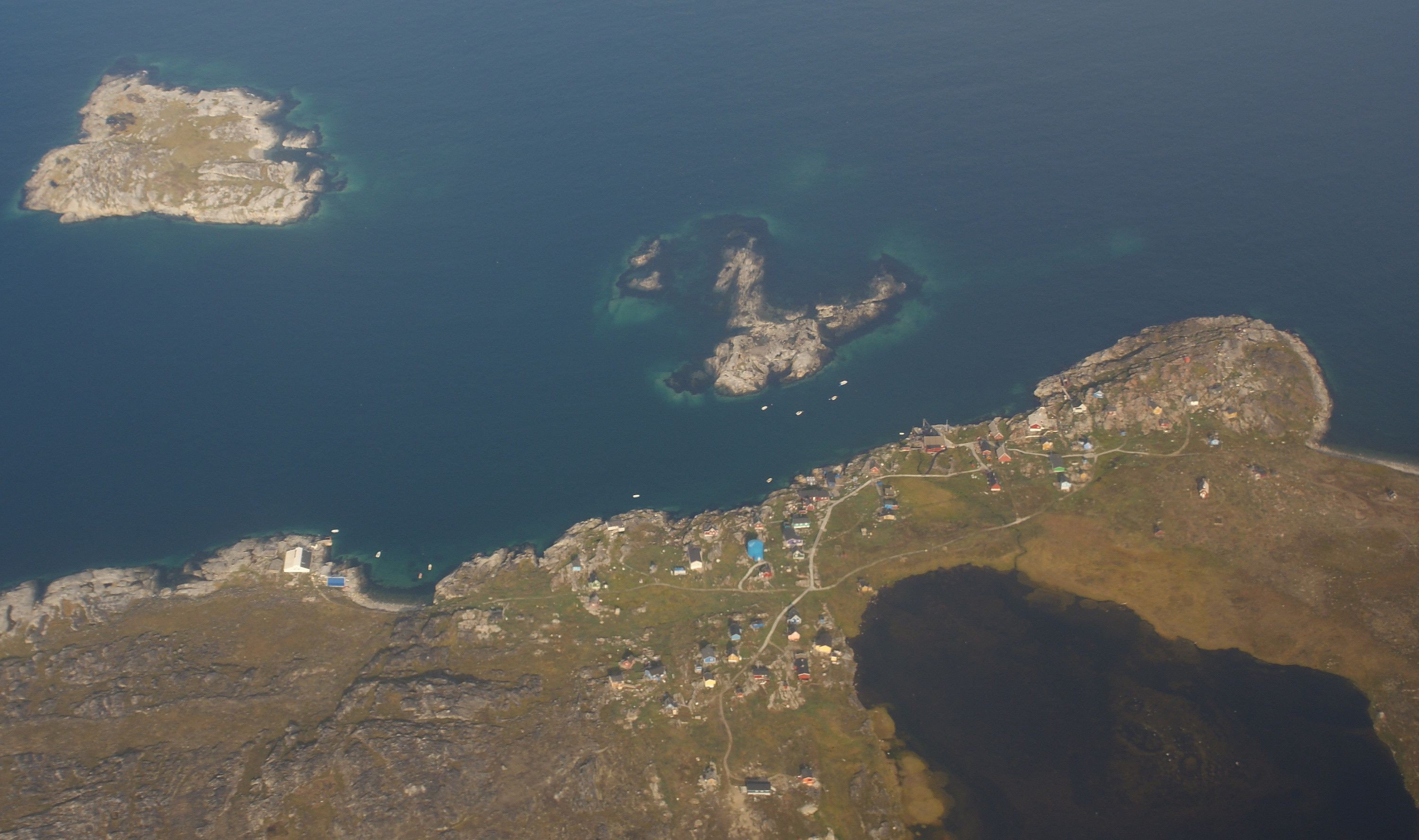
- Aerial view of Ilimanaq

- Location within Greenland
- Coordinates: 69°04′52″N 51°06′55″W
- Sovereign state: Kingdom of Denmark
- Autonomous country: Greenland
- Municipality: Avannaata
- Founded: 1741

Government
  - Mayor: Fritz Johansen

Population (1 January 2025)
  - Total: 55
- Time zone: UTC−02:00 (Western Greenland Time)
  - Summer (DST): UTC−01:00 (Western Greenland Summer Time)
- Postal code: 3952 Ilulissat

Ilimanaq (Greenlandic pronunciation: [ilimanɑq]), also known in Danish as Claushavn, is a settlement in Avannaata municipality in western Greenland. It had 55 inhabitants in 2025. The modern name of the village is Kalaallisut for "Place of Expectations".

== Geography ==
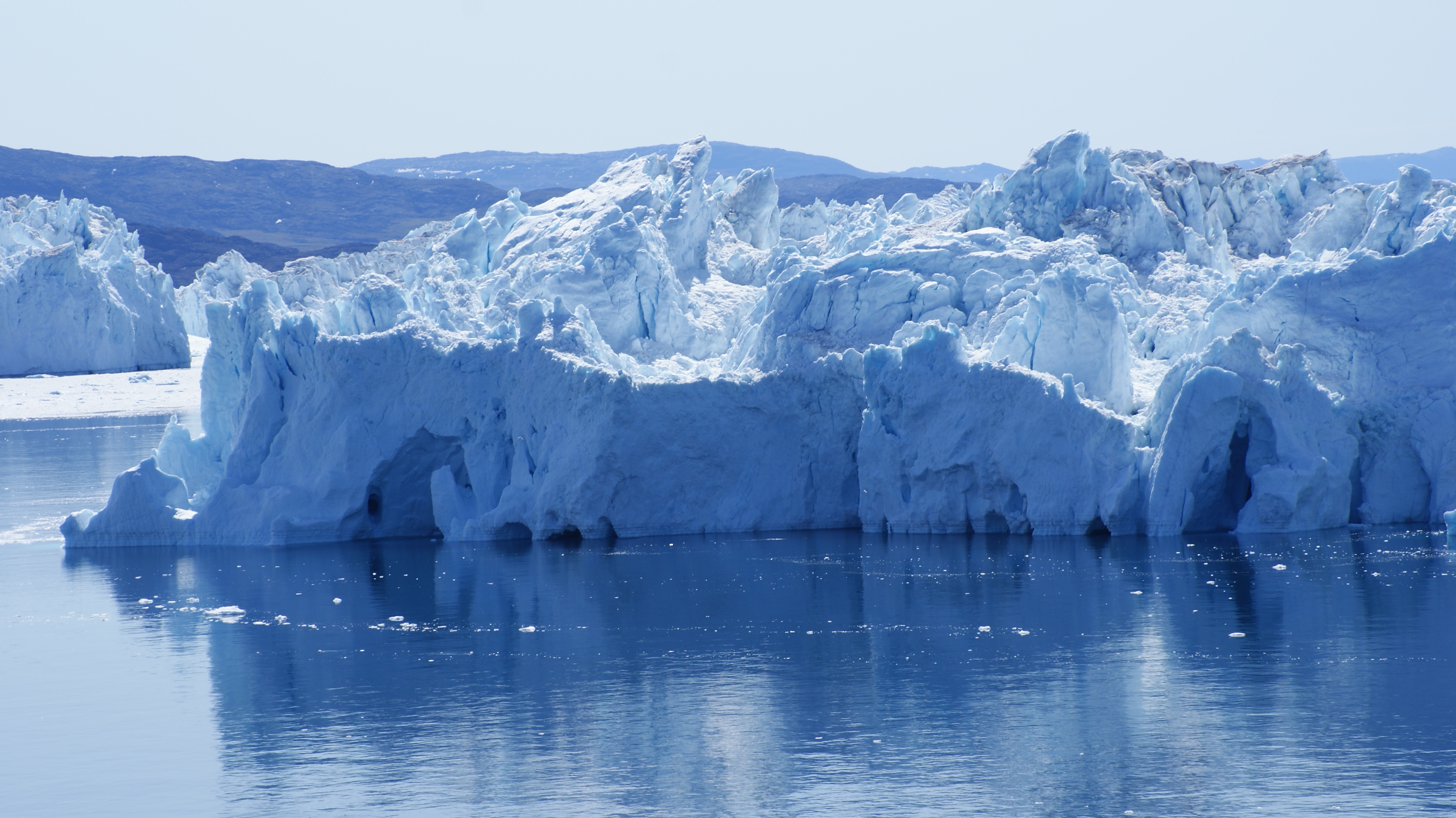
Icebergs in the Ilulissat Icefjord with Ilimanaq hills in the background

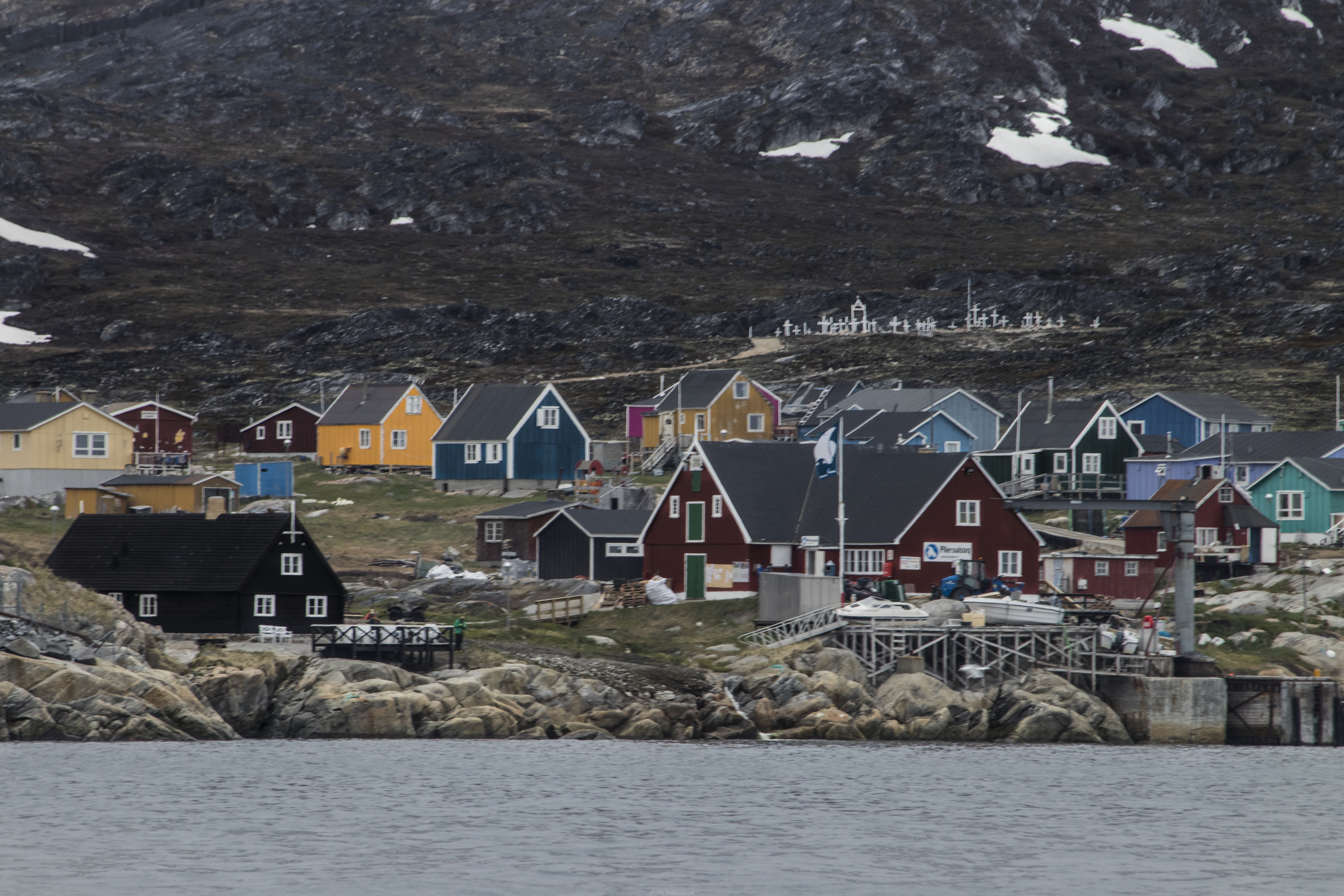
Ilimanaq Town in Greenland

=== Climate ===
Ilimanaq is located on the eastern shore of Disko Bay, just south of the mouth of the Ilulissat Icefjord (Greenlandic: Ilulissat Kangerlua).

== History ==
The old Danish name of the settlement derived from the Dutch whaler Klaes Pieterz Torp. The whalers were active in the region from 1719 to 1732, leaving a trail of names behind – the settlement of Oqaatsut to the north was originally a Dutch whaling station named "Rodebay". Claushavn was founded in 1741, around the same time as Ilulissat.

In 1752, Niels Brønlund Bloch, Poul Egede's cousin, established a mission in Ilimanaq.

After 1880, the settlement lost its importance. The church from 1908 and the old colonial houses have been renovated. Ilimanaq is the starting point for hikes to Qasigiannguit and for boat trips in the ice fjord.

== Infrastructure ==
The main sources of livelihood are hunting, fishing and tourism. Two of the settlement's houses, which were former hunting lodges, are now rented out to tourists. The village has both street lights and marked paths in the immediate area. There is also a local Pilersuisoq supermarket.

== Transport ==
=== Air ===
Air Greenland serves the village as part of government contract, with winter-only helicopter flights between Ilimanaq Heliport and Ilulissat Airport. Settlement flights in the Disko Bay are unique in that they are operated only during winter and spring. During winter, the nearby Qasigiannguit town to the south of Ilimanaq can be reached on foot, or by dogsled.

=== Sea ===
During summer and autumn, when the waters of Disko Bay are navigable, communication between settlements is by sea only, serviced by Diskoline. The ferry links Ilimanaq with Ilulissat, from where ferry connections are available to Oqaatsut, Qeqertaq, Saqqaq, Qeqertarsuaq, and towns and settlements in the Aasiaat Archipelago.

== Population ==
The population of Ilimanaq has been stable in the last two decades.

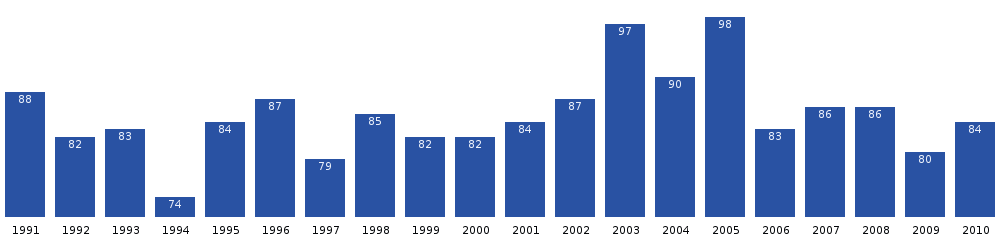
Ilimanaq population growth dynamics in the last two decades. Source: Statistics Greenland
