= Kangersuatsiaq =

Kangersuatsiaq Prøven
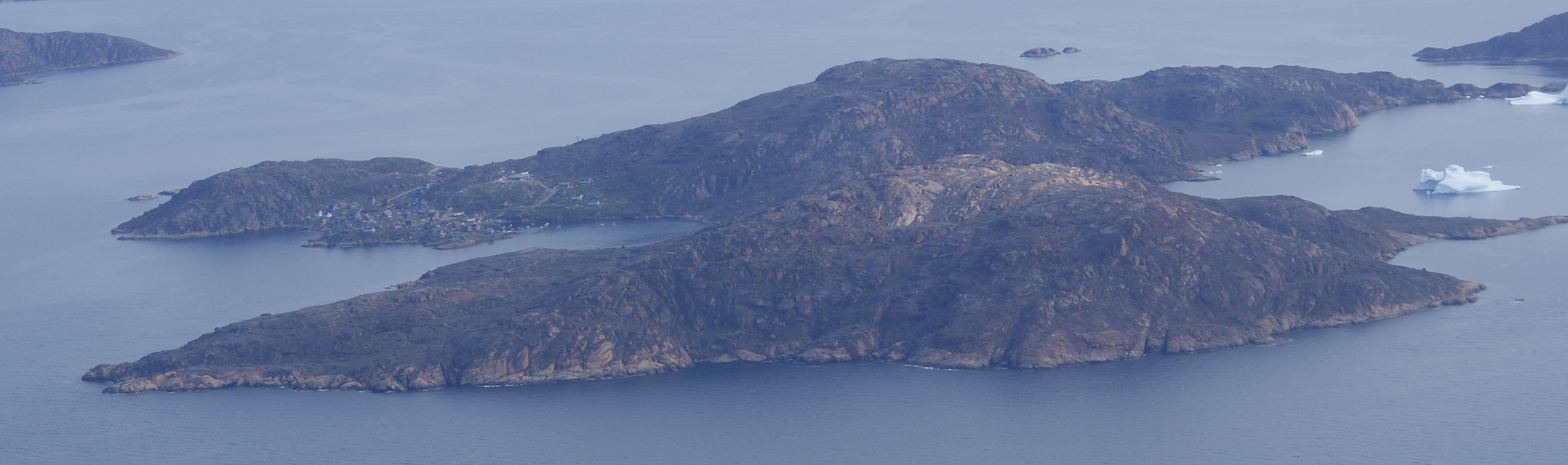
- Kangersuatsiaq

- Location within Greenland
- Coordinates: 72°22′47″N 55°33′00″W
- State: Kingdom of Denmark
- Constituent country: Greenland
- Municipality: Avannaata

Population (2026)
  - Total: 121
- Time zone: UTC−02:00 (Western Greenland Time)
  - Summer (DST): UTC−01:00 (Western Greenland Summer Time)

Kangersuatsiaq (old spelling: Kangerssuatsiaq), formerly Prøven, is an island settlement in the Avannaata municipality in northwestern Greenland. The city was estimated to have 121 inhabitants in 2026.

== Geography ==
=== Upernavik Archipelago ===
Kangersuatsiaq within the Upernavik Archipelago

Kangersuatsiaq is located within Upernavik Archipelago, a vast archipelago of small islands on the coast of northeastern Baffin Bay. The archipelago extends from the northwestern coast of Sigguup Nunaa peninsula in the south at approximately 71°50′N 56°00′W to the southern end of Melville Bay (Greenlandic: Qimusseriarsuaq) in the north at approximately 74°50′N 57°30′W.

== Infrastructure ==
The village has been named Greenland's best-functioning town several times because of its well-maintained houses, functioning shops, and low alcohol consumption.

Businesses consists primarily of fishing and catching other sea-life.

=== Schools ===
Folkeskolen Juaap Atuarfia enrolls approximately 31 students spanning from 1st to 9th grade.

== Transport ==
Air Greenland serves the village as part of government contract, with flights between Kangersuatsiaq Heliport and Upernavik Airport. The heliport consists of a grass landing area of 18 m × 27 m.

== Population ==
The population of Kangersuatsiaq has decreased by over a quarter relative to the 2000 levels, and is still decreasing.

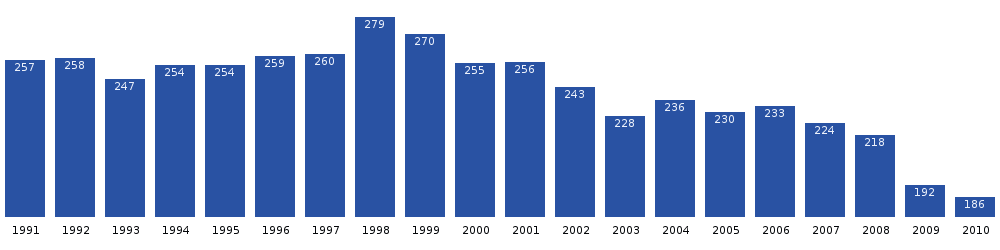
Kangersuatsiaq population growth dynamics in the last two decades. Source: Statistics Greenland
