= KGQ =

KGQ or kgq may refer to:

- Kamoro language (ISO 639-3 language code kgq), an Asmat-Kamoro language spoken in New Guinea
- Kangersuatsiaq Heliport (IATA code KGQ), a heliport in Kangersuatsiaq, Greenland
- Kasaragod railway station (Indian Railways station code KGQ), Kerala, India
