= KLQ =

KLQ can refer to:

- Kids' Lit Quiz, an annual literature competition founded in 1991 in New Zealand and now also in the United Kingdom, South Africa, Canada, United States, Australia, Hong Kong and Singapore
- Kullorsuaq Heliport (IATA airport code), in Kullorsuaq, Greenland
- WTNR (FM), a radio station in Grand Rapids, Michigan, formerly known as 107.3 KLQ
- KLQ.com, an internet radio station formerly on 107.3 FM in Grand Rapids, Michigan
- KLQ, the Indian Railways station code for Kilikollur railway station in Kollam City, Kerala, India
