= Qeqertarsuaq Heliport =

Heliport in Greenland

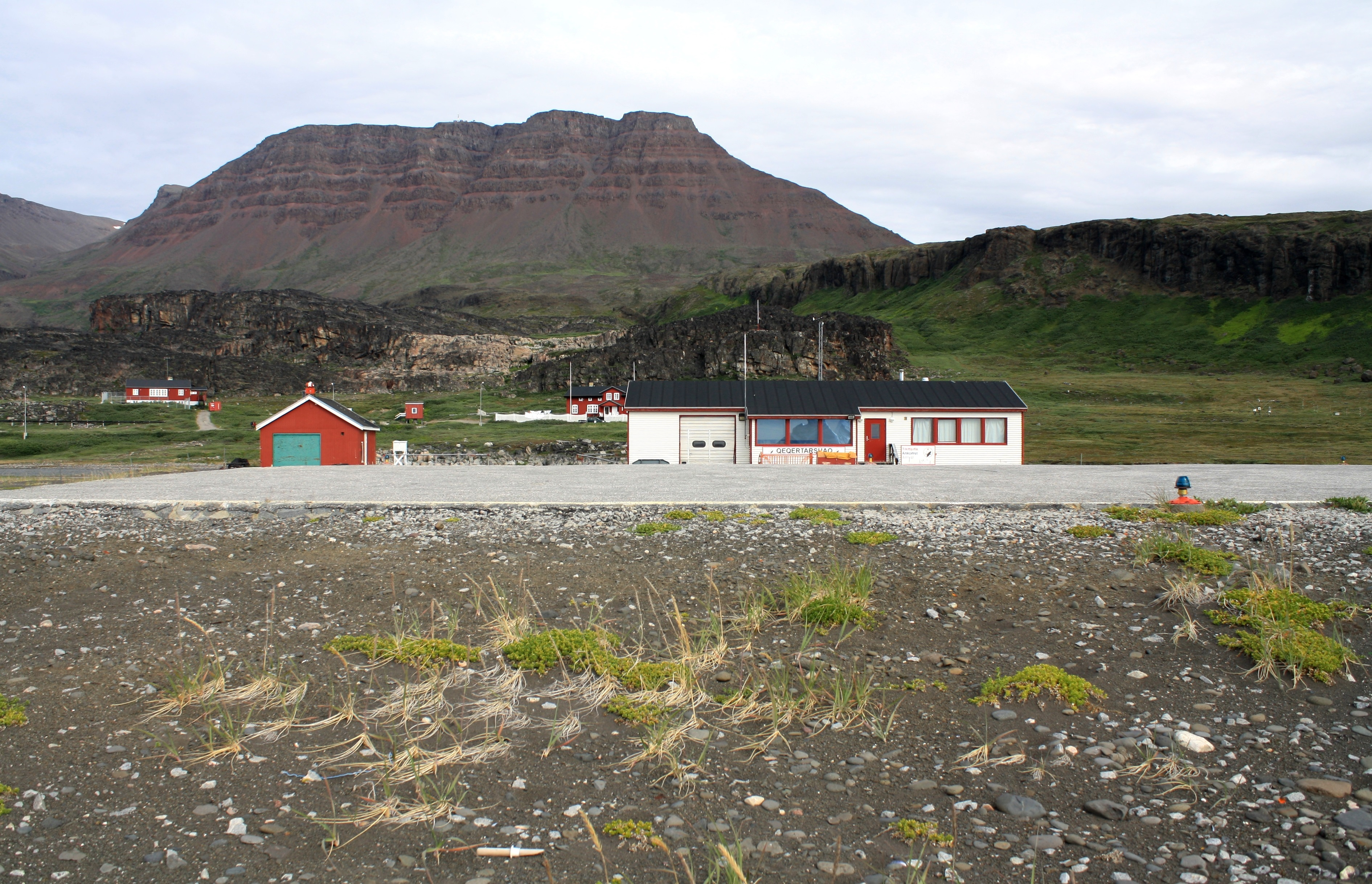
- IATA: JGO; ICAO: BGGN

Summary
- Airport type: Public
- Operator: Greenland Airport Authority (Mittarfeqarfiit)
- Serves: Qeqertarsuaq, Greenland
- Elevation AMSL: 9 ft / 3 m
- Coordinates: 69°15′05″N 053°30′53″W
- Website: Qeqertarsuaq Heliport

Map
- Location in Greenland

Helipads
Number	Length		Surface
Number	m	ft	Surface
1	20 × 20	66 × 66	Asphalt
- Source: Danish AIS

Qeqertarsuaq Heliport (IATA: JGO, ICAO: BGGN) is a heliport on the southern shore of Qeqertarsuaq Island in the Qeqertalik municipality, in western Greenland. It is located in Qeqertarsuaq, the biggest town on, and named after, the island.

== Airlines and destinations ==
Airlines	Destinations
Air Greenland	Seasonal: Aasiaat, Ilulissat, Qasigiannguit
