= Tasiusaq Heliport (Avannaata) =

Heliport in Greenland

- IATA: TQA; ICAO: BGTA

Summary
- Airport type: Public
- Operator: Greenland Airport Authority (Mittarfeqarfiit)
- Serves: Tasiusaq, Greenland
- Elevation AMSL: 181 ft / 55 m
- Coordinates: 73°22′23″N 056°03′37″W
- Website: Tasiusaq Heliport

Map
- Location in Greenland

Helipads
Number	Length		Surface
Number	m	ft	Surface
1	27 × 18	89 × 59	Asphalt
- Source: Danish AIS

Tasiusaq Heliport (IATA: TQA, ICAO: BGTA) is a heliport in Tasiusaq, a village in the Upernavik Archipelago of Avannaata municipality in northwestern Greenland. The heliport is considered a helistop, and is served by Air Greenland as part of a government contract.

There is also a heliport with the same name located in the village of Tasiusaq in the Kujalleq municipality in southern Greenland.

== Airlines and destinations ==
Airlines	Destinations
Air Greenland (settlement flights)	Innaarsuit, Upernavik
