= Kangersuatsiaq Heliport =

Heliport in Greenland

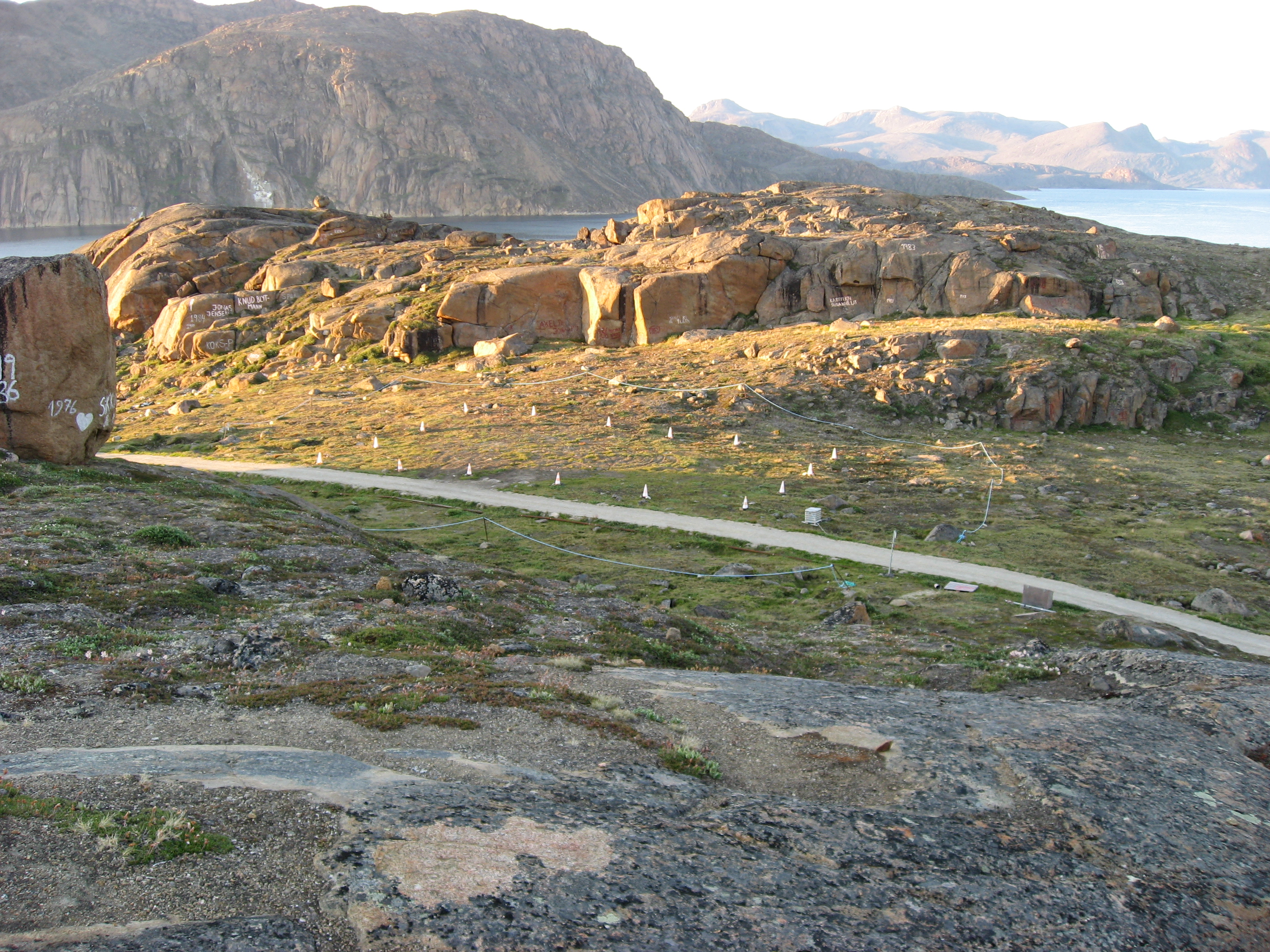
- IATA: KGQ; ICAO: BGKS; LID: KAQ

Summary
- Airport type: Public
- Operator: Greenland Airport Authority (Mittarfeqarfiit)
- Serves: Kangersuatsiaq, Greenland
- Elevation AMSL: 112 ft / 34 m
- Coordinates: 72°22′52″N 055°32′12″W
- Website: Kangersuatsiaq Heliport

Map
- Location in Greenland

Helipads
Number	Length		Surface
Number	m	ft	Surface
1	27 × 18	89 × 59	Grass
- Source: Danish AIS

Kangersuatsiaq Heliport (IATA: KGQ, ICAO: BGKS) is a heliport in Kangersuatsiaq, a village in the Upernavik Archipelago of Avannaata municipality in northwestern Greenland. The heliport is considered a helistop, and is served by Air Greenland as part of a government contract.

== Airlines and destinations ==
Airlines	Destinations
Air Greenland (settlement flights)	Upernavik, Upernavik Kujalleq

Air Greenland operates government contract flights to villages in the Upernavik Archipelago. These mostly cargo flights are not featured in the timetable, although they can be pre-booked. Departure times for these flights as specified during booking are by definition approximate, with the settlement service optimized on the fly depending on local demand for a given day.
