= Innaarsuit Heliport =

Heliport in Innaarsuit, Greenland

- IATA: IUI; ICAO: BGIN

Summary
- Airport type: Public
- Operator: Greenland Airport Authority (Mittarfeqarfiit)
- Serves: Innaarsuit, Greenland
- Elevation AMSL: 95 ft / 29 m
- Coordinates: 73°12′09″N 056°00′40″W

Map
- Location in Greenland

Helipads
Number	Length		Surface
Number	m	ft	Surface
1	15	49	Gravel
- Source: Danish AIS

Innaarsuit Heliport (IATA: IUI, ICAO: BGIN) is a heliport in Innaarsuit, a village in the Upernavik Archipelago of Avannaata municipality in northwestern Greenland. The heliport is considered a helistop, and is served by Air Greenland as part of a government contract.

== Airlines and destinations ==
Airlines	Destinations
Air Greenland (settlement flights)	Tasiusaq, Upernavik

== Accidents ==
In 1993 a Bell 212 helicopter operated by Grønlandsfly, crashed near Innarsuit. Four were killed (both pilots and two passengers) of the seven on board.
