= Moriusaq Heliport =

Heliport in Greenland

- IATA: none; ICAO: BGMO

Summary
- Airport type: Public
- Operator: Mittarfeqarfiit
- Serves: Moriusaq, Greenland
- Elevation AMSL: 44 ft / 13 m
- Coordinates: 76°45′50″N 069°59′50″W

Map
- Location in Greenland

Moriusaq Heliport (ICAO: BGMO) was a heliport in Moriusaq, a depopulated village in Avannaata municipality in northern Greenland. The heliport was considered a helistop, and was served by Air Greenland as part of a government contract. By 2012, the village population had dwindled to 0, and thus operations at the heliport have been discontinued.

== Airlines and destinations ==
Air Greenland operated government contract flights to villages in the Qaanaaq area. These mostly cargo flights were not featured in the timetable, although they could be pre-booked. Departure times for these flights as specified during booking were by definition approximate, with the settlement service optimized on the fly depending on local demand for a given day.

=== Transfers at Pituffik Space Base ===
Travellers bound for Pituffik Space Base in Pituffik were required to apply for an access permit from either Rigsombudsmanden in Nuuk (residents of Greenland) or the Danish Foreign Ministry (all others). Failure to present the permit during check-in resulted in denial of boarding. The same rules applied for transfers at Pituffik, including a stopover on the way from Moriusaq to Savissivik.
