= Upernavik Kujalleq Heliport =

Heliport in Greenland

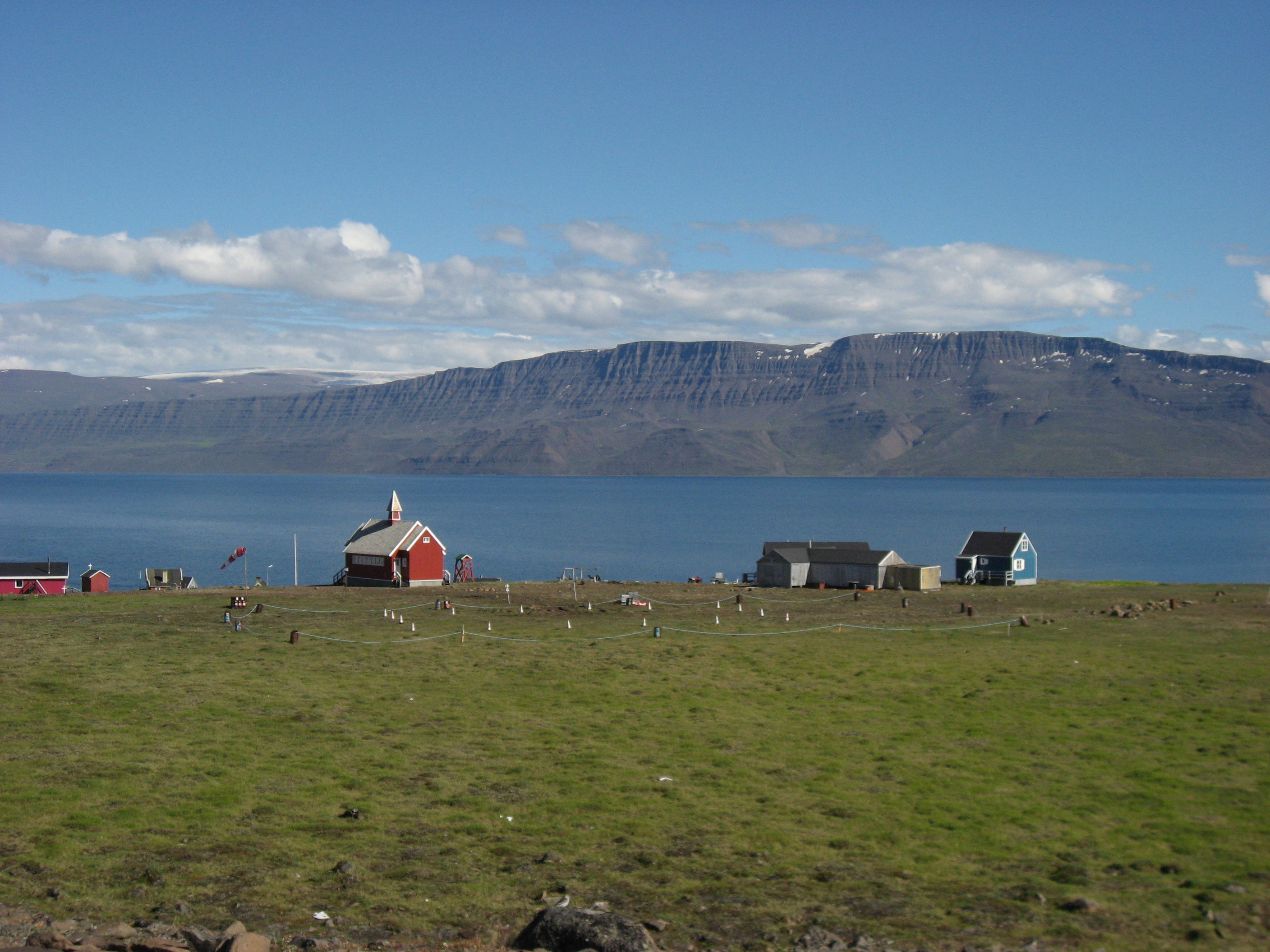
- IATA: none; ICAO: BGKL; LID: UPK

Summary
- Airport type: Public
- Operator: Greenland Airport Authority (Mittarfeqarfiit)
- Serves: Upernavik Kujalleq, Greenland
- Elevation AMSL: 92 ft / 28 m
- Coordinates: 72°09′10″N 055°31′52″W
- Website: Upernavik Kujalleq Heliport

Map
- Location in Greenland

Helipads
Number	Length		Surface
Number	m	ft	Surface
1	30 × 20	98 × 66	Gravel
- Source: Danish AIS

Upernavik Kujalleq Heliport (ICAO: BGKL) is a heliport in Upernavik Kujalleq, a village in the Upernavik Archipelago of Avannaata municipality in northwestern Greenland. The heliport is considered a helistop, and is served by Air Greenland as part of a government contract.

== Airlines and destinations ==
Airlines	Destinations
Air Greenland (settlement flights)	Kangersuatsiaq, Upernavik

Air Greenland operates government contract flights to villages in the Upernavik area. These mostly cargo flights are not featured in the timetable, although they can be pre-booked. Departure times for these flights as specified during booking are by definition approximate, with the settlement service optimized on the fly depending on local demand for a given day.
