= Ilulissat Airport =

Airport in Ililissat, Greenland

Ilulissat Airport Mittarfik Ilulissat
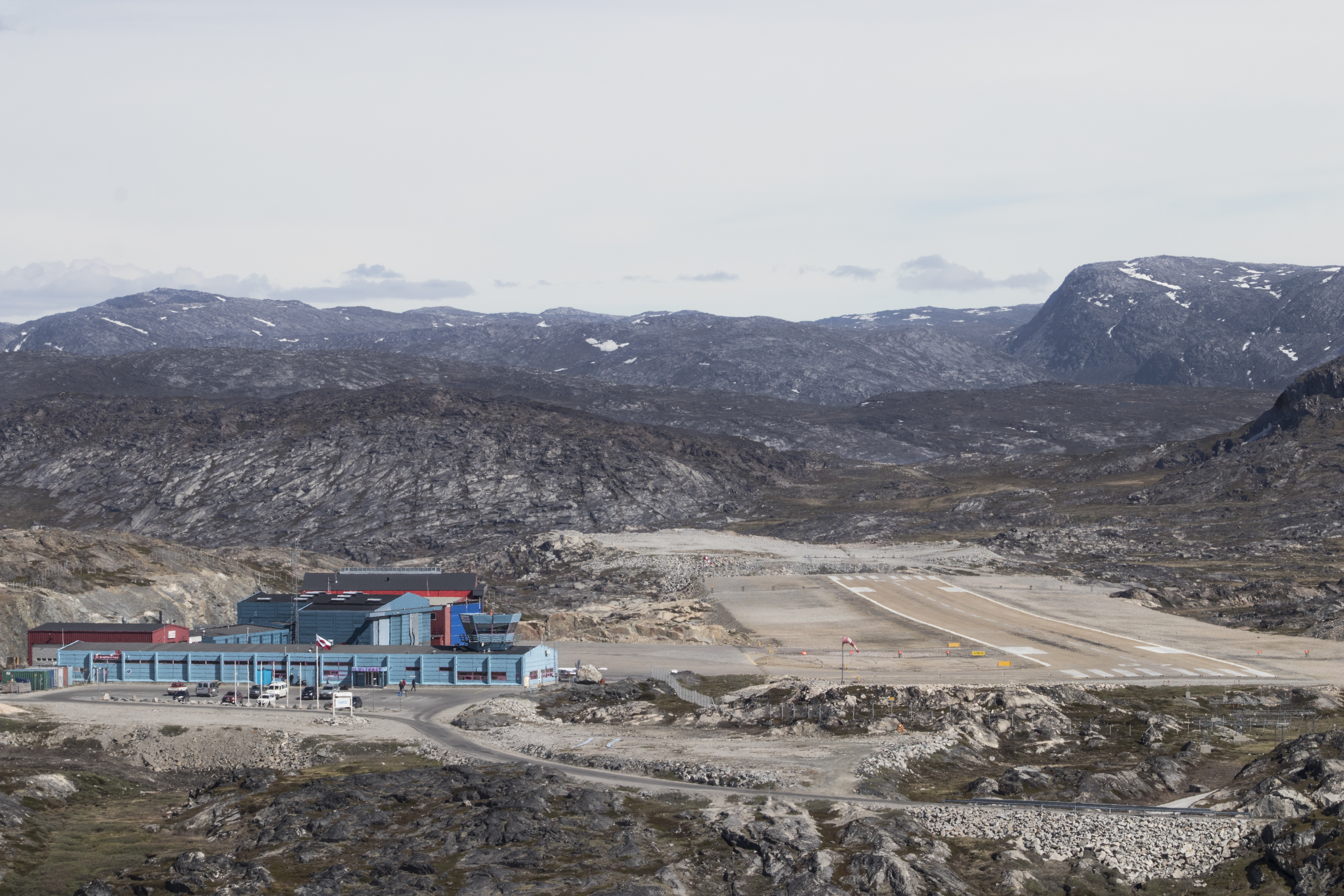
- IATA: JAV; ICAO: BGJN

Summary
- Airport type: State owned
- Owner: Mittarfeqarfiit
- Serves: Ilulissat and Disko Bay, Greenland
- Location: Ilulissat, Avannaata Municipality
- Opened: 29 September 1984
- Hub for: Air Greenland
- Elevation AMSL: 95 ft (29 m)
- Coordinates: 69°14′36″N 051°03′26″W

Map
- Location within Greenland

Runways
Direction	Length		Surface
Direction	m	ft	Surface
06/24	2,200	7,218	Asphalt

Statistics (2012)
- Passengers: 83,930
- Source: AIP

Ilulissat Airport (Greenlandic: Mittarfik Ilulissat, Danish: Ilulissat Lufthavn, originally Jacobshavn Lufthavn); (IATA: JAV, ICAO: BGJN) is a international airport serving Ilulissat, Greenland, the entire Disko Bay Region, the North and West Greenland. It is the third-busiest airport in Greenland, and the second busiest for international travel in Greenland.

The airport is located north-east of Ilulissat, just 2.8 kilometres (1.7 mi) of city centre. It was built as a short take off and landing (STOL) airport in 1984, replacing the heliport. Air Greenland uses the airport as a domestic hub for northern Greenland.

A major expansion of the airport, including a new, longer runway and a new terminal was completed in 2026, which allows larger jet aircraft to serve more international destinations. The new airport opened on 29 October 2026.

== History ==
Prior to the 1980s, helicopters dominated domestic air travel in Greenland. A heliport was built in Ilulissat in the 1960s, located just south of the town at 69.209335°N 51.109138°W.

The government began building a network of short take-off and landing (STOL) airports in Greenland to improve connectivity, partially funded by the EU Structural Funds and Cohesion Fund. Ilulissat Airport opened on 29 September 1984, preceded by Nuuk Airport in 1979, replacing earlier heliports. Fixed wing flights using De Havilland Canada Dash 7 fixed-wing aircraft to the capital, Nuuk were now possible. Ilulissat and it became Air Greenland's northern base in Greenland, serving helicopter traffic further north and eventually more fixed-wing flights as airports such as Qaanaaq and Qaarsut and Upernavik opened in the 1990s.

== Airport expansion ==
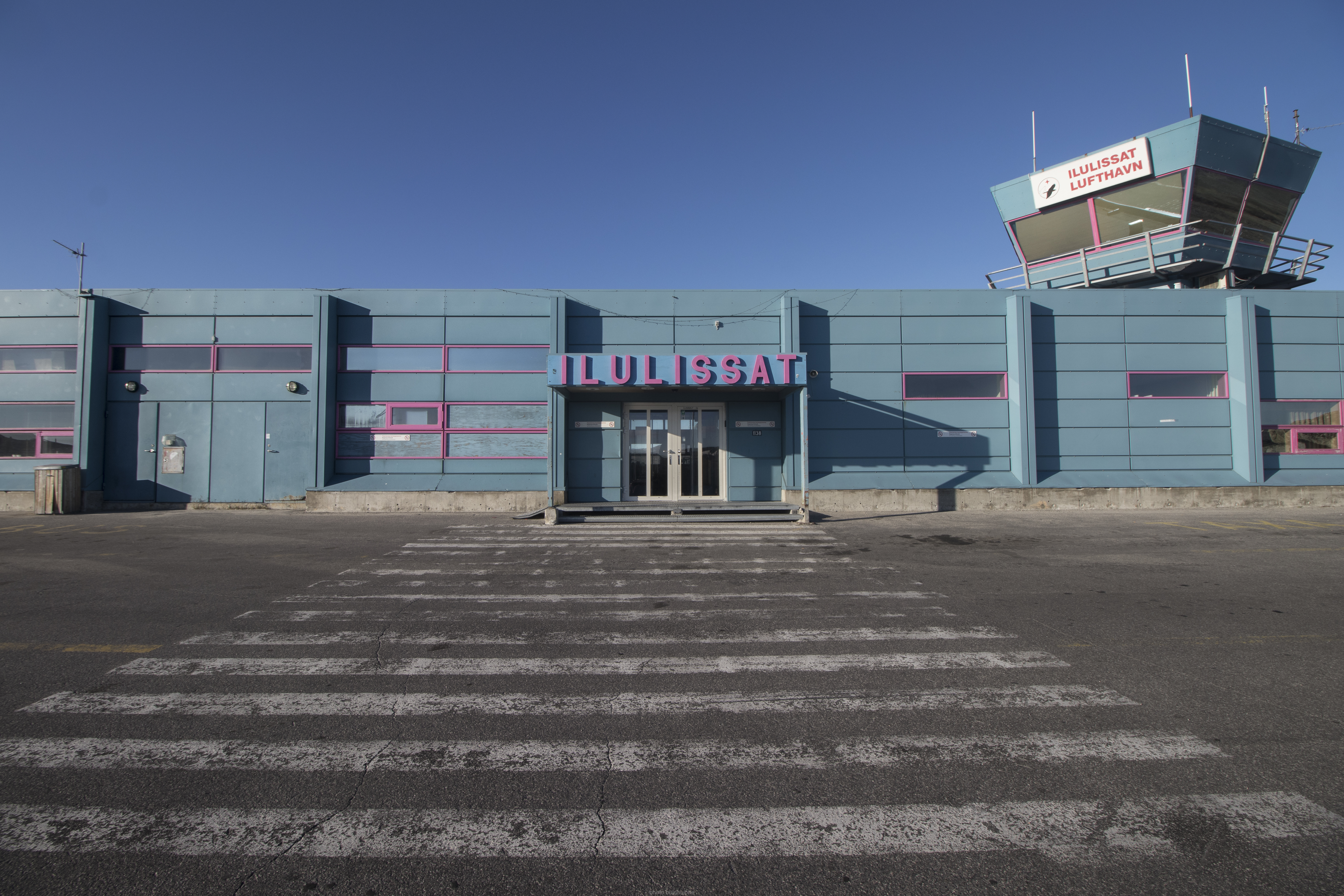
Former terminal building

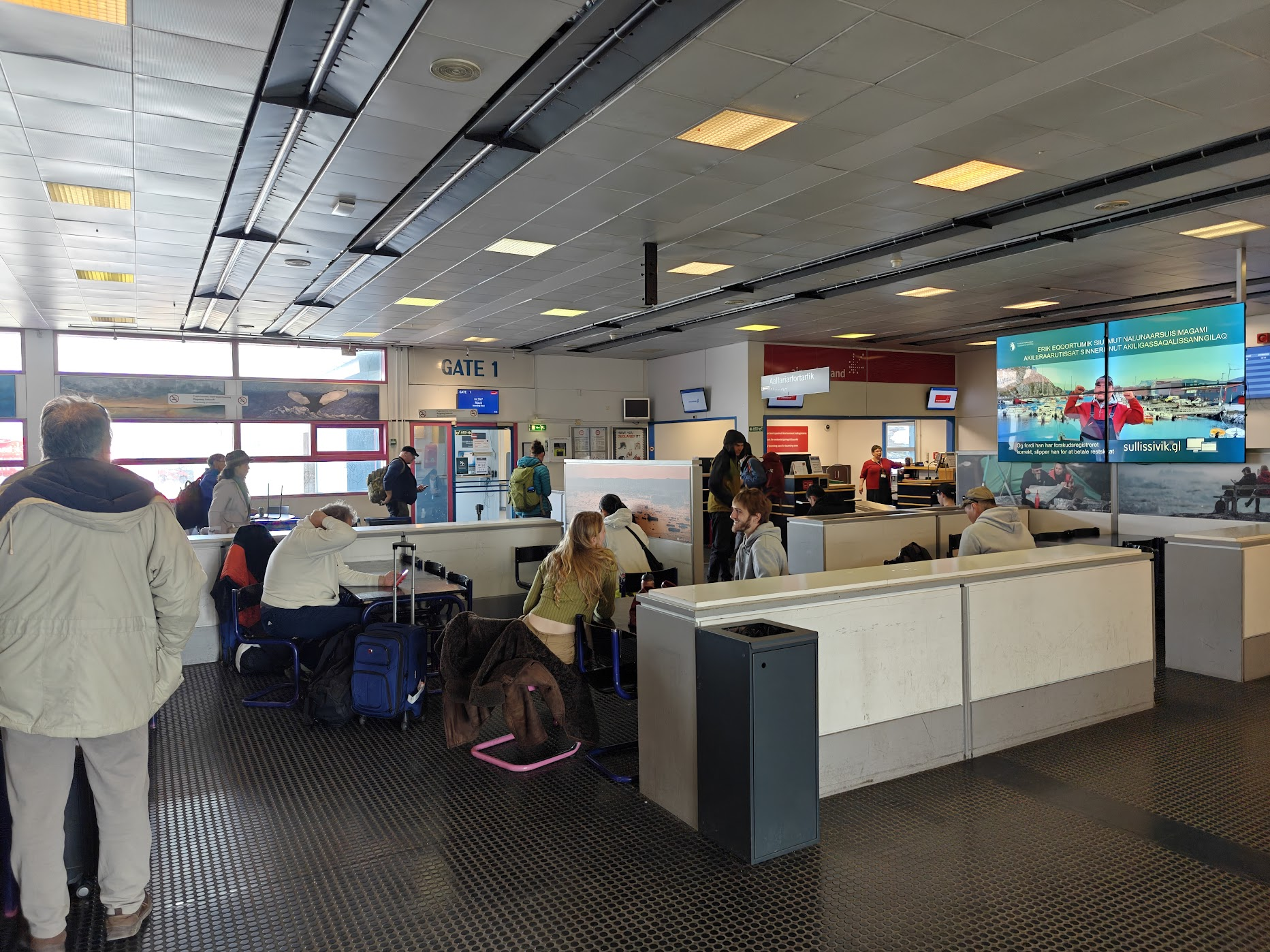
Inside of the former terminal

The expansion of Ilulissat Airport has been debated in Greenland for decades; there had been pressure for runway extension from the local tourist industry and municipal authorities.

The expansion of the airport entailed the construction of a completely new 2,200 m × 60 m (7,218 ft × 197 ft) runway to allow the airport receive direct international airliner flights from mainland Europe and the Americas. The new runway and terminal were constructed just north of the former airport, with the old runway being used as an access road to the new terminal. The old terminal and hangars subsequently became redundant.

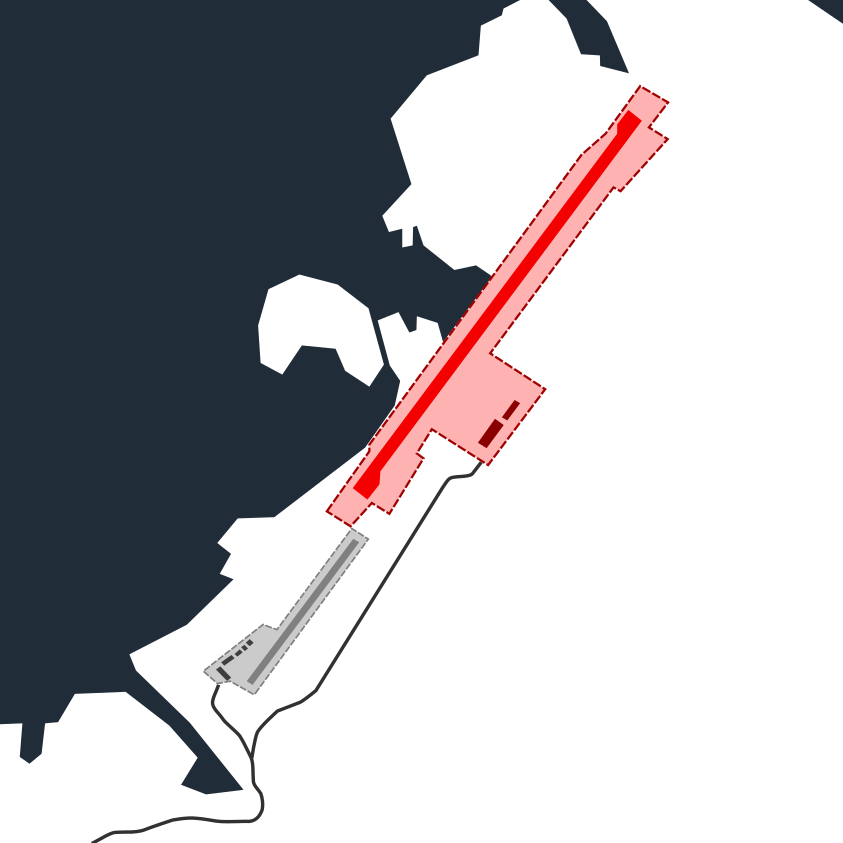
Map depicting the airport expansion. New runway is drawn in red.

The Nuuk and Ilulissat airport expansions have been subsidised with DKK 1.6 billion by the Government of Denmark. The expansion was due to be completed by 2024, but delays pushed the opening to 2026. In 2025, the expansion was over budget, and needed a further DKK 400 million subsidy from the Government of Denmark, and a loan extension of DKK 1140 million.

On 29 October 2026, the expanded Ilulissat Airport officially opened to the public, along with the commencement of a route to Copenhagen.

== Airlines and destinations ==
Airlines	Destinations
Air Greenland	Aasiaat, Copenhagen, Ilimanaq, Nuuk, Qaanaaq, Qaarsut, Qeqertaq, Saqqaq, Sisimiut, Upernavik; Seasonal: Kangerlussuaq, Qasigiannguit, Qeqertarsuaq
Icelandair	Seasonal: Reykjavik–Keflavík

Icelandair (then domestically branded as Air Iceland), began twice-weekly flights to Reykjavík-Keflavík in 2009 using Dash 8 aircraft. Until 2026, it was the only international route to Ilullissat.

Air Greenland operates government contract flights to villages in the Disko Bay area. These mostly cargo flights are not featured in the timetable, although they can be pre-booked. Departure times for these flights as specified during booking are by definition approximate, with the settlement service optimized on the fly depending on local demand for a given day. Settlement flights in the Disko Bay and Aasiaat archipelago areas are operated only during winter and spring. During summer and autumn, communication between settlements is by sea only, serviced by Diskoline.

== Accidents and incidents ==
- On 29 January 2014, a De Havilland DHC-8 operated as Air Greenland Flight 3205 suffered substantial damage in a landing accident. On landing, the left main gear collapsed and the plane skidded down a slope and came to a rest near the perimeter fence. This caused three injuries, not serious, and the aircraft was scrapped. The cause was a pilot error in difficult wind conditions.

== See also ==
- List of airports in Greenland
- List of the busiest airports in the Nordic countries
