= Kullorsuaq Heliport =

Heliport in Greenland

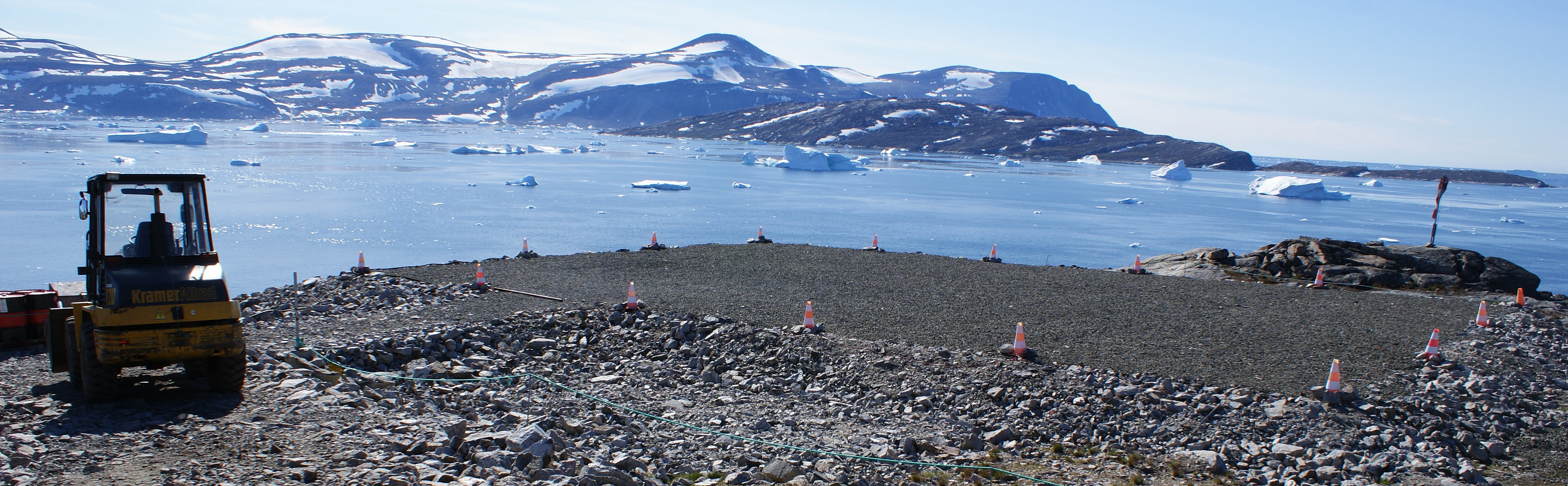
- IATA: KHQ; ICAO: BGKQ

Summary
- Airport type: Public
- Operator: Greenland Airport Authority (Mittarfeqarfiit)
- Serves: Kullorsuaq, Greenland
- Elevation AMSL: 148 ft / 45 m
- Coordinates: 74°34′46″N 057°14′08″W
- Website: Kullorsuaq Heliport

Map
- Location in Greenland

Helipads
Number	Length		Surface
Number	m	ft	Surface
1	30 × 20	98 × 66	Gravel
- Source: Danish AIS

Kullorsuaq Heliport (IATA: KHQ, ICAO: BGKQ) is a heliport in Kullorsuaq, a village in the Upernavik Archipelago of Avannaata municipality in northwestern Greenland. The heliport is considered a helistop, and is served by Air Greenland as part of a government contract.

== Airlines and destinations ==
Airlines	Destinations
Air Greenland (settlement flights)	Nuussuaq, Upernavik
