= Upernavik Airport =

Airport in Greenland

Upernavik Airport Mittarfik Upernavik
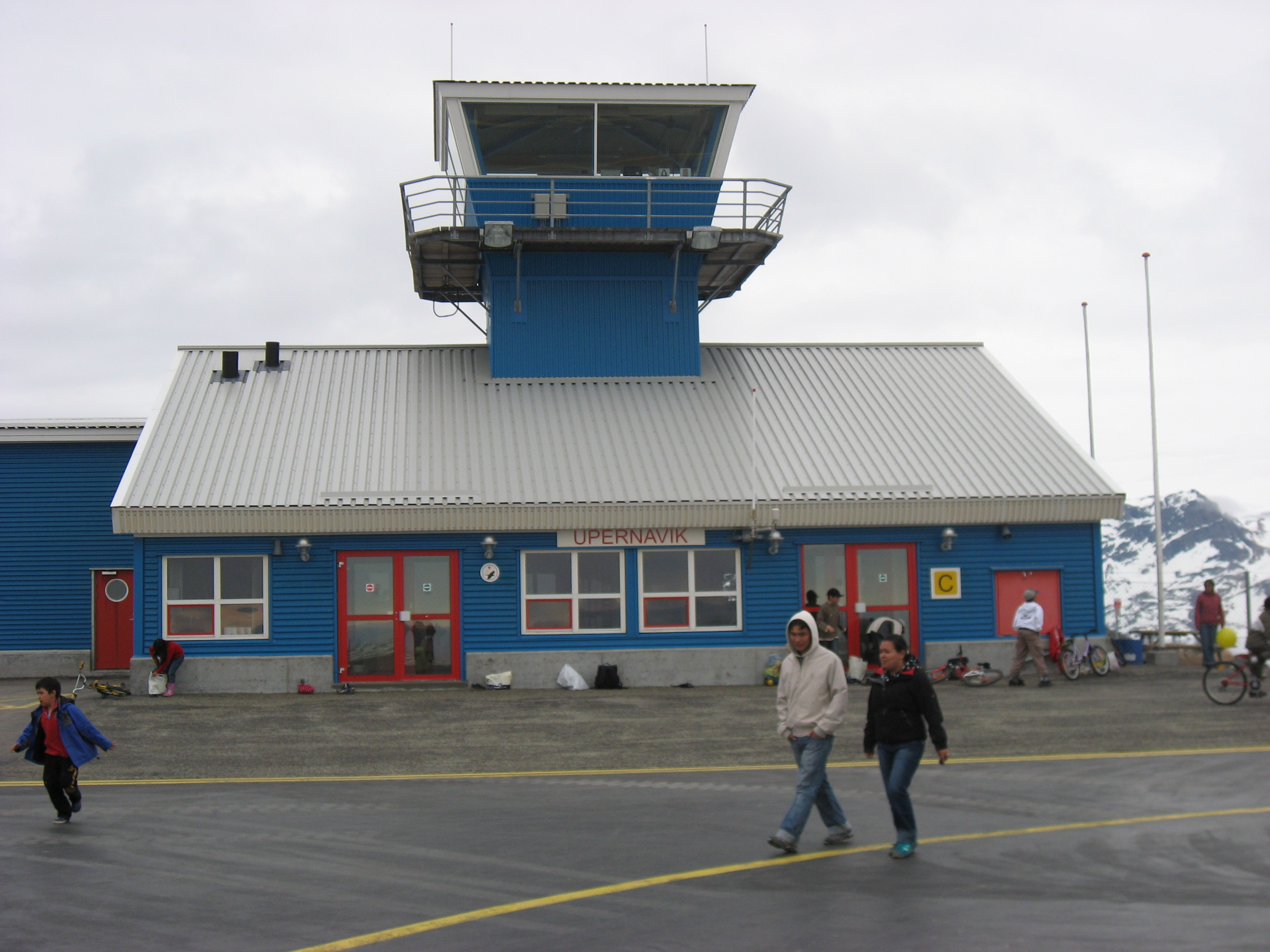
- IATA: JUV; ICAO: BGUK

Summary
- Airport type: Public
- Operator: Greenland Airport Authority (Mittarfeqarfiit)
- Serves: Upernavik, Greenland
- Opened: 1 October 2000
- Elevation AMSL: 414 ft / 126 m
- Coordinates: 72°47′25″N 056°07′50″W
- Website: Upernavik Lufthavne

Map
- Location in Greenland

Runways
Direction	Length		Surface
Direction	m	ft	Surface
04/22	799	2,621	Asphalt

Statistics (2012)
- Passengers: 6,776
- Source: Danish AIS

Upernavik Airport (Greenlandic: Mittarfik Upernavik, Danish: Upernavik Lufthavn) (IATA: JUV, ICAO: BGUK) is an airport located 0.5 NM (0.93 km; 0.58 mi) northeast of Upernavik, a town in Avannaata municipality in northwestern Greenland, capable of serving STOL aircraft. It is used as a transfer airport for passenger/cargo traffic to northern Greenland (Qaanaaq Airport), and serves as a local helicopter hub of Air Greenland with flights to settlements in the Upernavik Archipelago.

== History ==
Upernavik Airport was one of a series of airports built in several Greenlandic cities starting in 1995. The airport opened on 1 October 2000. It replaced a heliport just north of the town at 72.792177°N 56.150132°W.

== Airlines and destinations ==
Airlines	Destinations
Air Greenland	Aappilattoq, Ilulissat, Innaarsuit, Kangersuatsiaq, Kullorsuaq, Nuussuaq, Qaanaaq, Tasiusaq, Thule, Upernavik Kujalleq

Air Greenland operates government contract flights to villages in the Upernavik Archipelago. These mostly cargo flights are not featured in the timetable, although they can be pre-booked. Departure times for these flights as specified during booking are by definition approximate, with the settlement service optimized on the fly depending on local demand for a given day.
