= Greenland Airports =

Civilian airport operator in Greenland

Greenland Airports Mittarfeqarfiit
- Type: Self government-owned
- Industry: Airport operator
- Founded: 1988 (Mittarfeqarfiit); 2016 (Kalaallit Airports); 2024 (Merged to Greenland Airports)
- Headquarters: Nuuk, Greenland
- Area served: Greenland
- Key people: Jens Wittrup-Willumsen (Chairman); Jens R. Lauridsen (CEO)
- Revenue: DKK 244 million (2003)
- Operating income: DKK -31 million (2003)
- Net income: DKK -127 million (2005)
- Number of employees: 450 (2020)
- Parent: Government of Greenland
- Subsidiaries: Greenland Airports Regional A/S (100%); Greenland Airports International A/S (66.66%)
- Website: airports.gl

Greenland Airports A/S (Greenlandic: Mittarfeqarfiit) is a self government-owned company managing civilian airports and heliports in Greenland.

It operates 14 airports, all of which can accommodate fixed-wing STOL operations year-round, and three of which can handle larger airliners. It also operates a large, countrywide network of 43 heliports, of which 8 are primary heliports, while the rest are considered 'helistops'.

The company employs over 450 people, staffed primarily at larger airports. Most 'helistops' are operated by Air Greenland.

Greenland Airports is regulated by the Danish Civil Aviation and Railway Authority.

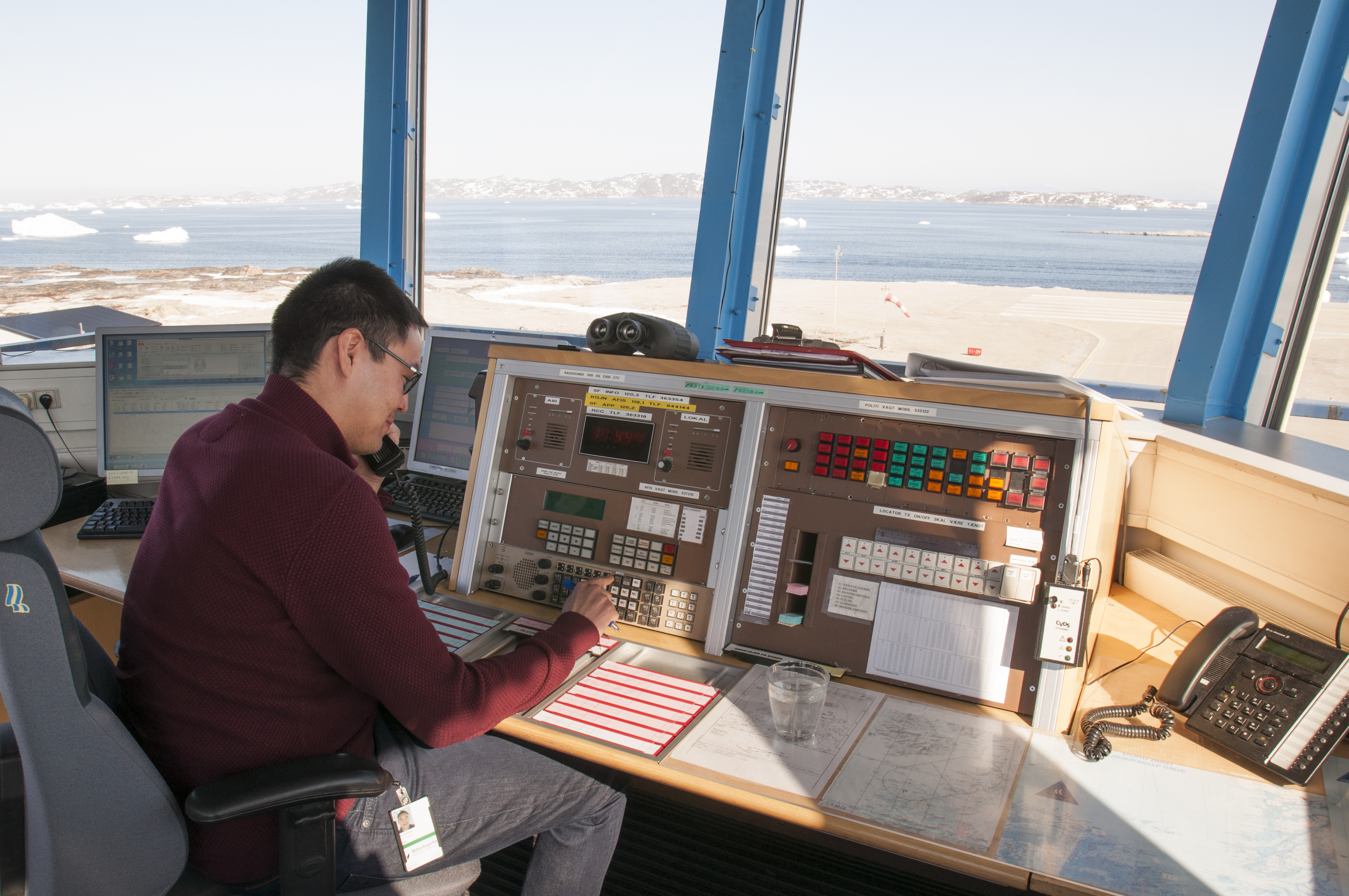
Tower at Aasiaat Airport

== History ==
Aviation in Greenland was historically primarily reliant on airports built for military purposes during World War II by the United States: Kangerlussuaq Airport, Narsarsuaq Airport and Kulusuk Airport. Towns were served by helicopters through a network of heliports, mostly on the west coast.

In 1979, a STOL airport was constructed in Nuuk and in Ilulissat in 1984. Fixed-wing flights using smaller aircraft were now possible, reducing transport costs and increasing service. As a result of its success, in 1998–2007, the Greenlandic Government began building a network of STOL airports in 8 major towns in western Greenland to improve transport by moving away from the dependence on helicopters between towns. The airports built by the Greenlandic government were at Ilulissat, Sisimiut, Aasiaat, Maniitsoq, Qaarsut, Qaanaaq, Upernavik and Paamiut. In conjunction, Mittarfeqarfiit (Greenland Airports) was established.

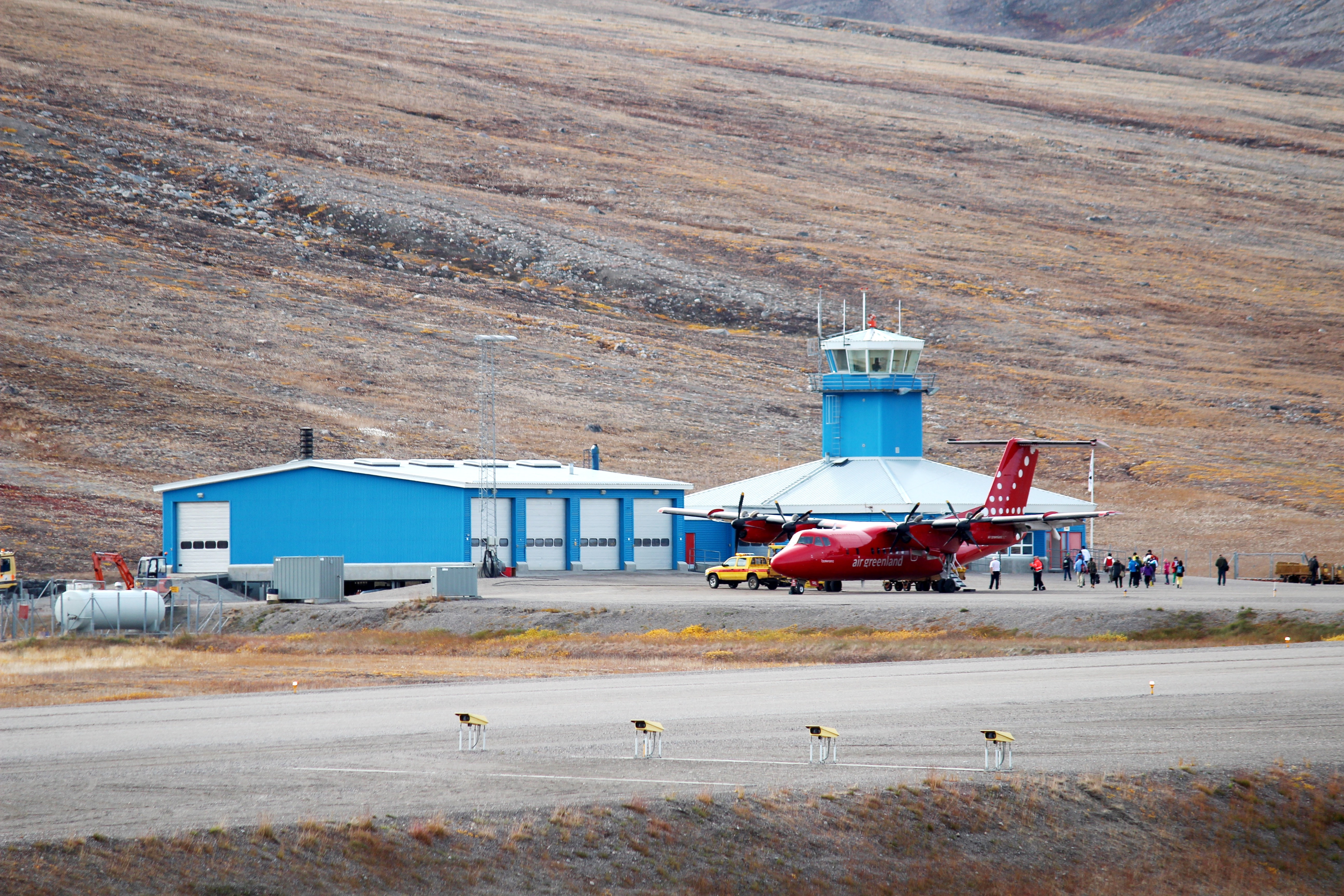
Qaarsut Airport. Most STOLports in Greenland are built in the same style.

In 2016, the state owned company Kalaallit Airports A/S was formed when it was decided that three new or rebuilt airports would be constructed closer to larger population centres in Nuuk, Ilulissat and Qaqortoq. These airports will accommodate larger jet aircraft which can serve international destinations, at a cost of 3.6 billion DKK (approximately US$560 million), primarily financed by the Danish state. Kalaallit Airports A/S would build and operate these three new airports.

Former logo, until 2024.

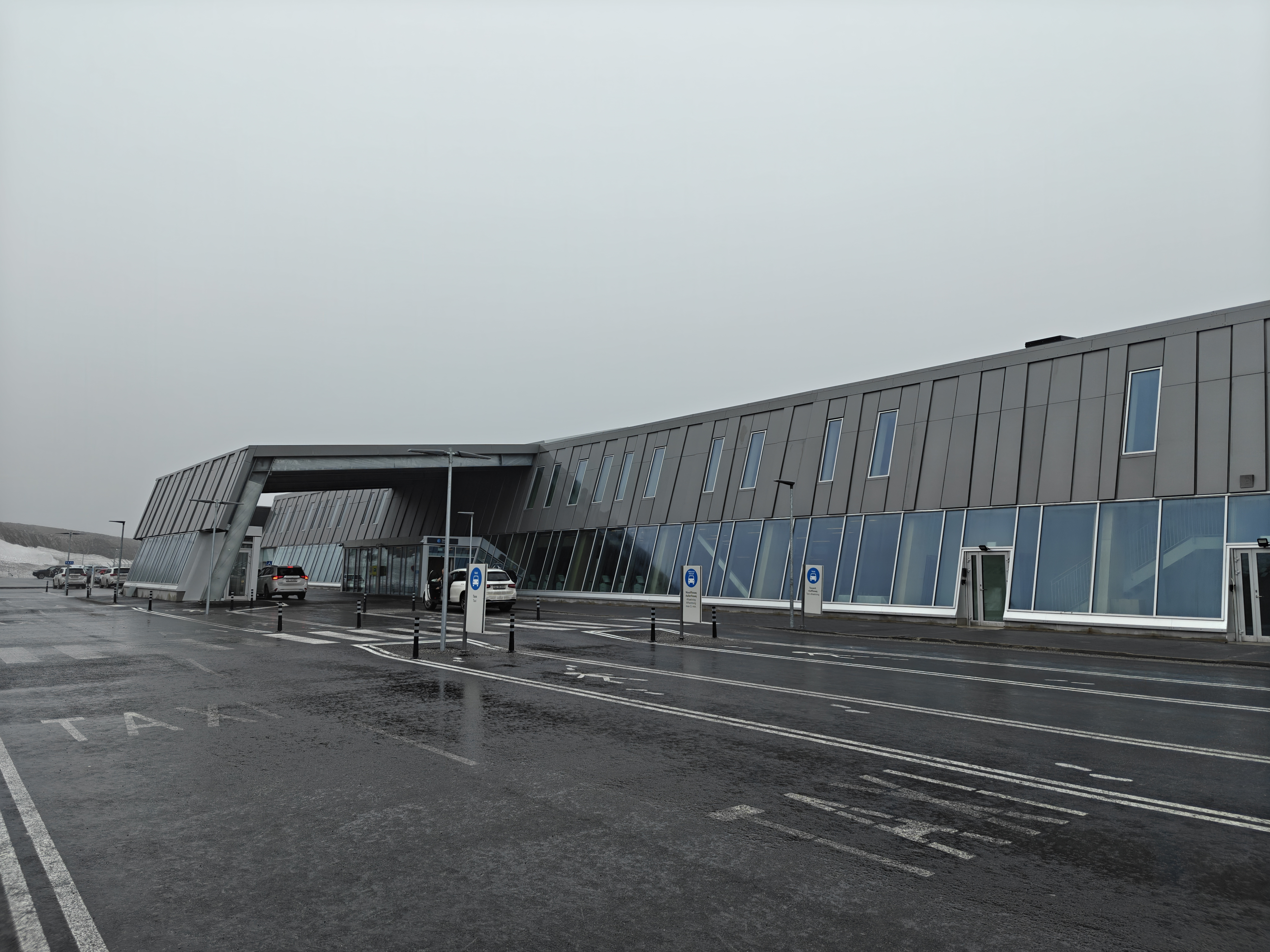
Nuuk Airport new terminal, opened in 2024. Hub of Air Greenland.

In April 2024, Kalaallit Airports and Mittarfeqarfiit were merged into a new company called Greenland Airports.

== Greenland Airports International A/S ==
In 2016, a project was initiated by the Greenlandic self-government to modernize and expand Nuuk and Ilulissat Airports and construct a new regional Qaqortoq Airport.

The project initially drew international scrutiny when the China Communications Construction Company was pre-qualified as a bidder, rising geopolitical concerns by the United States and Denmark regarding Chinese influence in the Arctic region and ultimately Chinese military presence in the Western hemisphere. This led to a Danish intervention in 2018 and 2019 with a funding package of 700 million DKK, and the airports were moved into a new company Greenland Airports International A/S, where the Danish Ministry of Finance got a 33.33% ownership and Greenland Airports retained the remaining 66.66% stake. The funding was later seen as insufficient, and the Danish government increased total contributions to more than 1.6 billion DKK, as the company was not determined capable of taking commercial loans.

Nuuk International Airport was officially inaugurated on November 28, 2024, featuring a 2,200 meter runway for direct transatlantic routes, predominantly to and from Denmark, Canada, Iceland, and the United States.

The new Qaqortoq Airport opened on April 16, 2026, replacing Narsarsuaq Airport as Greenland's southern hub.

The new Illulissat Airport was inaugurated on October 29, 2026.

== Airports ==
The following airports host flights to and from Greenland. The other airports only host domestic travel.

Airport	Municipality	International connection	Airlines
Ilulissat Airport	Avannaata	Copenhagen Seasonal: Reyjavík-Keflavík	Air Greenland; Icelandair
Kulusuk Airport	Sermersooq	Seasonal: Reyjavík-Keflavík	Icelandair
Qaqortoq Airport	Kujalleq	Seasonal: Reyjavík-Keflavík	Icelandair
Nerlerit Inaat Airport	Sermersooq	Reykjavík Akureyri	Norlandair
Nuuk Airport	Sermersooq	Copenhagen; Reykjavík-Keflavík; Seasonal: Aalborg, Billund, Newark, Iqaluit	Air Greenland; Icelandair; Scandinavian Airlines (seasonal); United Airlines (seasonal)

== See also ==
- Transport in Greenland
- Air Greenland
- Danish Civil Aviation and Railway Authority
