= Church of Our Saviour (Qaqortoq) =

Church in Greenland, Kingdom of Denmark

Church of Our Savior
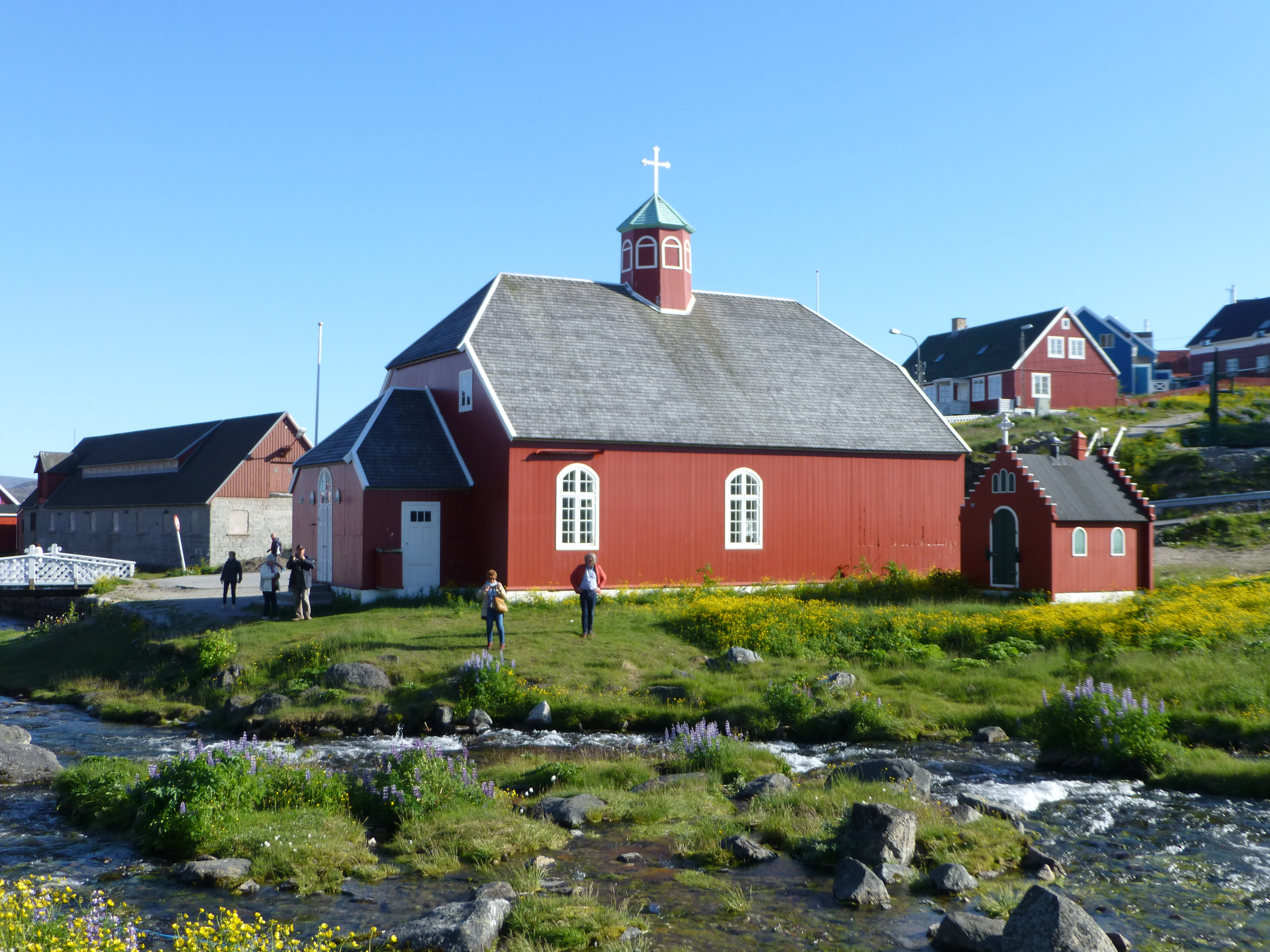
- Church of Our Savior
- 60°43′06″N 46°02′25″W
- Location: Qaqortoq
- Country: Greenland; Kingdom of Denmark
- Denomination: Lutheran

History
- Founded: 1832

The Church of Our Savior (Danish: Vor Frelsers Kirke) is a wooden Lutheran church in Qaqortoq, the largest town in southern Greenland. It was established in 1832. The red church is part of the old, colonial harbour district of the town.

== History ==
The church was built from 1832, and was commissioned and built by the city of Drammen in Norway and Danish missionaries. It was consecrated the same year.

Bone Falch Rønne (1764-1833) was a Danish priest who founded the Danish Missionary Society (1821), which initially worked mainly for Greenland, and he was behind the donation of the church.

The church has two large paintings, the Baptism of Jesus and the Supper at Emmaus, the latter possibly by Adam Müller, as well as three portraits of Bone Falch Rønne, Hans Egede and Poul Egede.

The church has been refurbished and rebuilt several times since. Until the newer Gertrud Rasch's Church was built in 1973, it was the only church serving the Qaqortoq congregation.

The church housed a library at the second floor until the 1940s.

== Interior ==
The ceiling ship is a model of the royal trade ship Hvalfisken, which was in service for almost a century, starting in 1804. The church also holds the commemorative wreath and the lifebuoy for M/S Hans Hedtoft, which sank south of Cape Farewell on her maiden voyage on January 30, 1959. The buoy was found on Iceland and is the only wreckage found of the ship.

The organ of the church is a 4 stop, foot pumped, Marcussen Organ from 1930.

== Landmarks ==
Outside the church is a memorial stele for the missionary Hans Egede and his wife Gertrud Rask.
