= Battle of Jacobshavn =

1739 Danish naval victory in Greenland

- Part of the Danish-Dutch conflict over Greenland
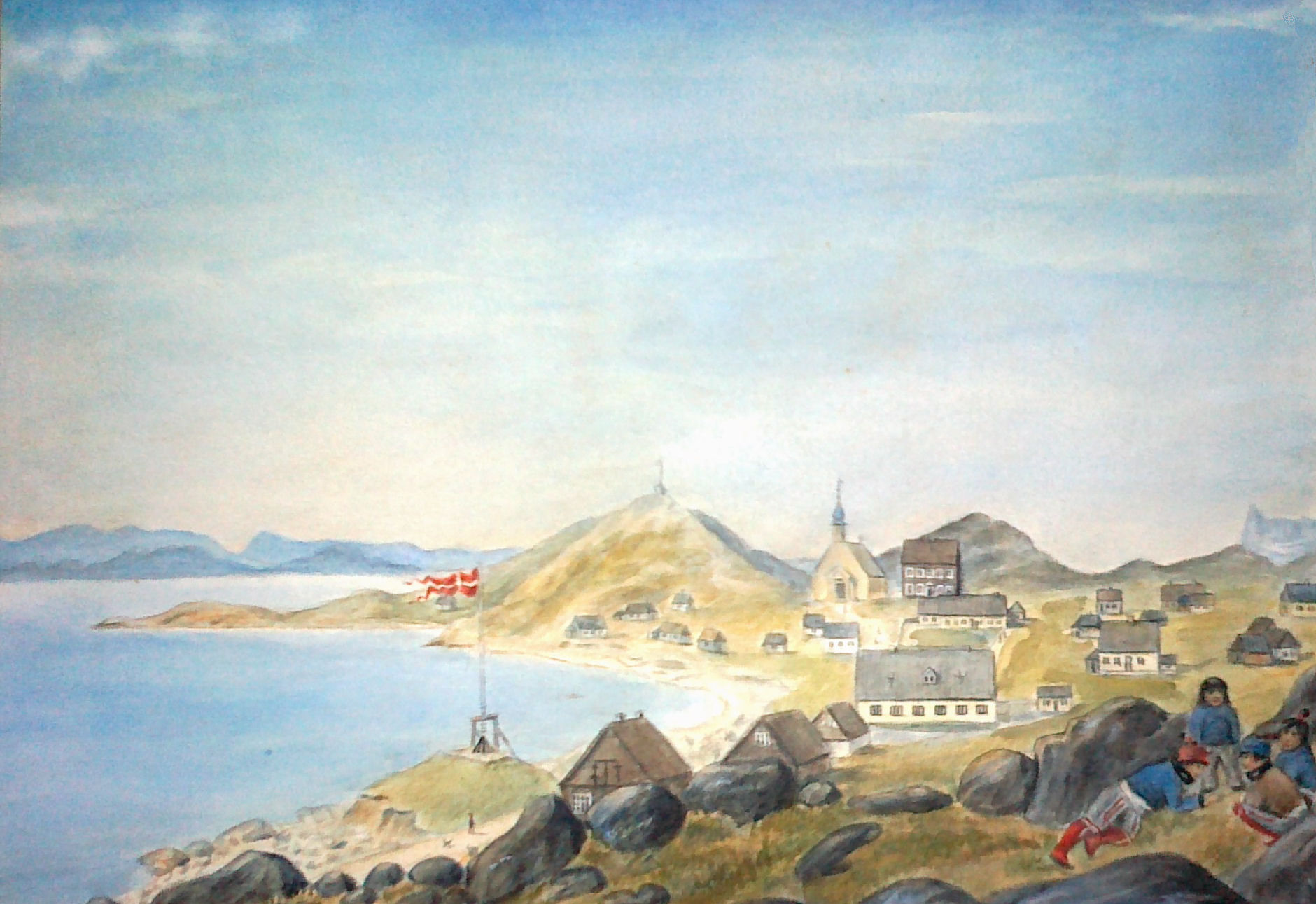
- Danish colony of Godthåb in Greenland
Date	6 June 1739
Location	Jacobshavn, Greenland 69°13′30″N 51°6′0″W
Result	Danish victory
Territorial changes	Danish consolidation of Greenland

Belligerents
Denmark-Norway	Dutch whalers

Commanders and leaders
Jacob Severin	Unknown (surrendered)

Strength
3 ships	4 ships 1 cannon

Casualties and losses
1 ship	4 ships captured 1 cannon

The Battle of Jacobshavn (Danish: Søslaget ved Jacobshavn, Dutch: Slag bij maklykout Greenlandic: Ilulissani qaleruaq eqqaani) also referred to as the Battle of Ilulissat, was a battle between Danish and Dutch ships over the control of Ilulissat (then Jacobshavn) on 6 June 1739. It has been the only naval battle fought over the rights of Greenland. The battle is sometimes also mentioned as the Battle of Maklykout, referring to the Dutch name of the trading post.

== Background ==
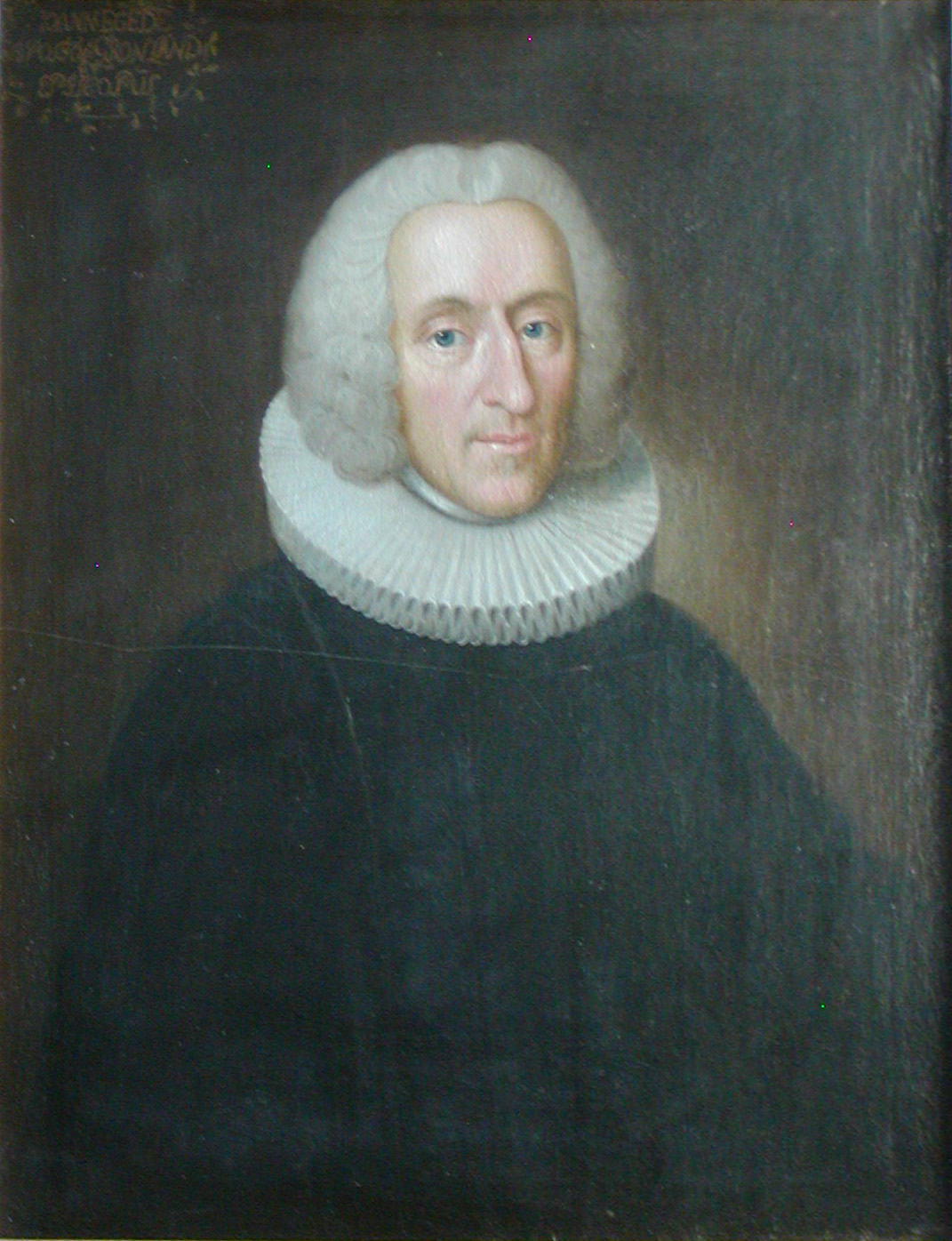
Hans Egede, the first missionary to Greenland

Since the missions of Hans Egede, the Dano-Norwegians had been recolonizing Greenland. Frederick IV of Denmark and Norway allowed for the establishment of the Bergen Greenland Company, which was charged with the administration and trade on Greenland. Yet Frederick refused to grant the company a monopoly on the island in fear of antagonizing Dutch whalers in the area. During the first decades of the company, it witnessed bankruptcy, diseases like smallpox (Note: Two child converts were sent to Copenhagen for the coronation of Christian VI. They returned in 1733 with smallpox, devastating the island.) and scurvy, and constant Dutch raids.

=== Whaling rivalry ===
Dutch whalers had been active in Greenland since the 17th century. This resulted in constant conflict over the monopoly to the whaling industry and the trade with Inuit between Danes and Dutchmen. Denmark-Norway claimed their historic rights to the island and pointed to the Norse settlements in Greenland, but also to the expeditions to Greenland by Christian IV and Frederick III, The latter included the Greenlandic Polar Bear on his personal arms as a sign of Danish-Norwegian sovereignty over the island.

On the other hand, the Dutch claimed the island on the basis of their expeditions and trade companies operating in the area.

Because of the Bergen Company's early failure, the Dane Jacob Severin convinced the new King, Christian VI, and his council to grant the company a full monopoly over trade on Greenland in 1734. Severin received the right to fly the Danebrog in order to fend off foreign ships. He also expanded Danish presence on the west coast, establishing the settlements of Christianshåb (1734), Jacobshavn (1741), and Frederikshåb (1742) This angered Dutch whalers in the area, and the opposing sides came into conflict at Jacobshavn in 1739.

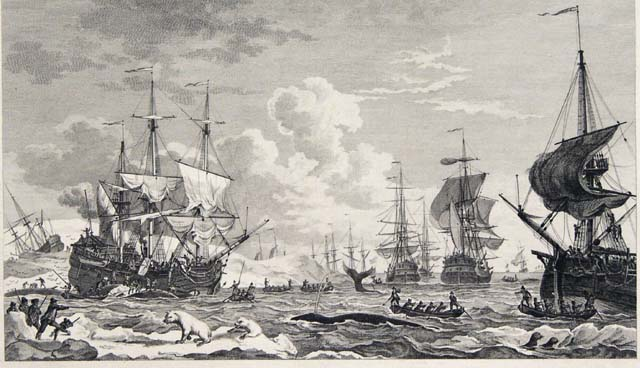
Whaling, by H. Kobell, Jr. The whaling industry in Greenland was much executed by Dutch and English whalers.

== Battle ==
A Dutch flotilla of four ships was moored in their harbourage Maklykout (which was later renamed Jacobshavn in honour of Jacob Severin) outside of Disko Bay. The Dutch had started trading with the local Greenlanders when they were caught by three Danish ships commanded by Jacob Severin. The Danes fired warning shots at the Dutch flotilla, yet the Dutch refused to leave the harbour. Severin attacked and the ensuing battle lasted about an hour, during which the Dutch suffered significant damage, before they lowered their flags, surrendered, and conceded their four ships to the Danes. This battle led to the consolidation of Danish-Norwegian presence on the island, and would be the only major naval battle fought over the rights of Greenland.

== See also ==
- South Greenland – Danish inspectorate
- Dutch colonial empire – Overseas territories controlled by the Dutch Republic and the Netherlands
- Battle of Öland – 1676 naval battle of the Scanian War
- Nuuk – Capital and largest city of Greenland
