= Jacob Severin =

Danish merchant

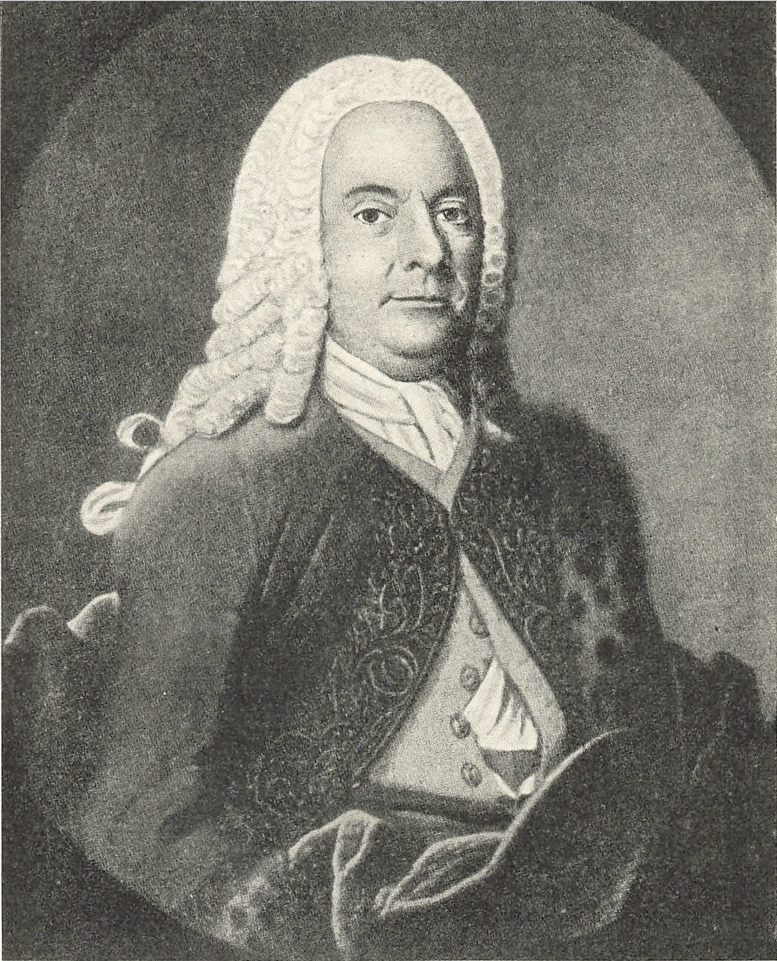
Jacob Severin.

Jacob Sørensen Severin (27 October 1691 – 21 March 1753) was a Danish merchant who held a trade monopoly on Greenland from 1733 to 1749.

== Biography ==
He was born in Sæby, Denmark, to Søren Nielsen (c. 1655–1730) and his wife Birgitte Ottesdatter. His father would later serve as bailiff (byfoged) of the community.

After attending school to the age of 15, he married at age 22 a woman over forty years his senior, Maren Nielsdatter, the widow of the merchant Segud Langwagen. Using her capital, Severin took over her former husband's monopoly over the Icelandic trade with Denmark and built a thriving company specialized on Iceland, Finnmark and whaling off Spitzbergen. As a member of Copenhagen's 32 Men, he had the right to an audience before the king.

The failure of the Bergen Greenland Company (Det Bergen Grønlandske Compagnie) operated by Hans Egede and of the royal colony in Greenland established by Claus Paarss allowed Severin to convince the new King Christian VI and his council to grant his company a full monopoly over trade with the Greenland settlements, a right King Frederick IV had previously withheld for fear of antagonizing merchants of the Dutch Republic.

The Greenland monopoly ran from 1733 and was renewed in 1740. Severin received the right to fly the Danebrog in 1738 and successfully repulsed the Dutch in 1738 and 1739, seizing four of their ships while losing only one of his own. His company was originally underwritten with an annual subsidy of 2000 rixdollars, but this was increased after he petitioned the king in 1740 and claimed to have already lost 16,000 rixdollars on the trade owing to the smallpox epidemic which had decimated the island between 1733 and 1735. Jacobshavn (modern Ilulissat) was named for him, and Poul Egede called him his dearest friend.

Severin married the second time in 1735 to Birgitte Sophie Nygaard of Resen (1704–1739). The same year he purchased Dronninglund Castle from diplomat Carl Adolph von Pless (1747–1810). The estate included a forest subsequently used to equip his ships. A third marriage in 1742 to his niece Mary Dalager required a royal license.

In 1749, Severin returned the monopoly, which the king then bestowed on the General Trade Company. Severin then focused his business on trade with Norway. Owing to his friendship with the missionary Paul Egede; however, Severin remained connected to the Greenland mission work throughout his life.

Jacob Severin was one of the most respected, influential and wealthy merchants of Copenhagen. He died on 21 March 1753 at Dronninglund Castle, his estate valued at 9,000 rixdollars, and was buried at Dronninglund Church (Dronninglund Kirke).
