= Hans Egede Saabye =

Danish priest (1746–1817)

Hans Egede Saabye (July 1746 – 31 August 1817) was a Danish priest and a missionary to Greenland.

He was born on the island of Strynø in southern Denmark. He was the son of parish priest Jørgen Saabye and Petronella Egede, one of the daughters of Hans Egede, the apostle of Greenland, whose Bergen Company had begun the Danish-Norwegian settlement there in 1721.

He graduated from Roskilde secondary school in 1764 and earned a degree in theology in 1767. In 1768, he was admitted to The Greenland Seminary (Seminarium Groenlandicum) and was instructed in the Greenlandic language by his maternal uncle, Poul Egede. In 1770, he was ordained into the ministry of the Church of Denmark. He was married to Vibeke Margrethe Thye (1748–1833) in April 1770. In the same year, he went as a missionary to Claushavn and Christianshåb in Greenland. In 1779, he became a parish priest in Vålse on Falster in south-eastern Denmark and in 1811 moved to Udby on Funen, where he died in 1817.

While in Greenland, he became an accomplished botanist. The diary from his stay in Greenland was published in 1816 and received much attention among ethnographers as well as friends of the mission. It has been translated into Swedish, German, Dutch, and English.

== Bibliography ==
- Brudstykker af en Dagbog holden i Grønland i Aarene 1770-1778 (1816)
- Fragmenter af en dagbok, hållen i Grönland (1817)
- Bruchstükke eines Tagebuches gehalten in Grönland in den Jahren 1770 bis 1778 (1817)
- Fragmenten mit een dagboek, gehouden i Groenland in de jaren 1770-78 (1818)
- Greenland: being extracts from a journal kept in that country in the years 1770 to 1778 (1818)

== Other sources ==
- Saabye, Hans Egede (2011) Greenland: being extracts from a journal kept in that country in the years 1770 to 1778 (Translated from the German by H. E. Lloyd, first published by Boosey and Sons, 1818. re-printed by British Library, Historical Print Editions) ISBN 9781241507923
