= Niels Egede =

Danish-Norwegian merchant and Lutheran missionary

Niels Rasch Egede
- Born: 1710; Vågan, Norway
- Died: 31 August 1782 (aged 71–72); Copenhagen, Denmark
- Occupations: Merchant; Lutheran missionary
- Parent(s): Hans Egede; Gertrud Rask

Niels Rasch Egede (1710 – 31 August 1782) was a Danish-Norwegian merchant and Lutheran missionary in Greenland.

== Biography ==
He was born at Vågan in the Lofoten archipelago to Lutheran missionary Hans Egede (1686–1758) and his wife Gertrud Rask (1673–1735). He was a brother of theologian and missionary Paul Egede (1708–1789). The family moved to Greenland in 1721.

From 1731 Egede was running trade business activities in Greenland, first in Godthåb (now Nuuk) and Christianshåb (now Qasigiannguit). After returning to Denmark in 1743, he was appointed in 1745 to postmaster in Kristiansund. In 1746, he married Elisabeth Eleonore Brun (1721–1785). In 1759 he returned to Greenland.

He founded the colony of Egedesminde (now Aasiaat) in 1759, and Holsteinborg (now Sisimiut) in 1764. He also participated in the Danish missionary work in Greenland. In 1776, Niels Egede turned his mercantile business to his son Jørgen Frederik Egede (1748–1807). He left Greenland in 1782 and died in Copenhagen that same year.
