= Qaqortoq =

City in Greenland

Qaqortoq Julianehåb
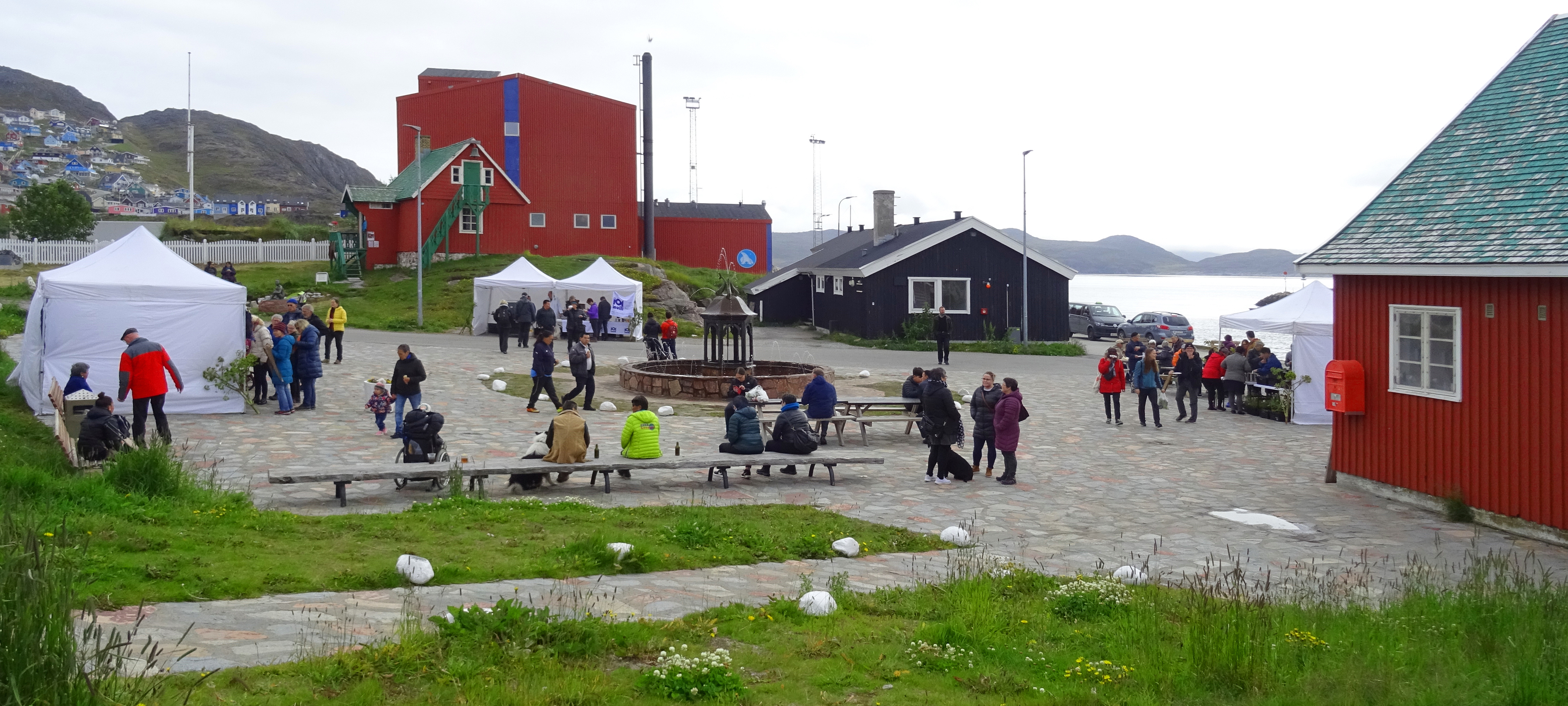
- Qaqortoq market square

- Flag Coat of arms

- Location within Greenland Qaqortoq (North Atlantic) Qaqortoq (Arctic)
- Coordinates: 60°43′20″N 46°02′25″W
- Sovereign state: Kingdom of Denmark
- Autonomous Territory: Greenland
- Municipality: Kujalleq
- Founded: 1774

Government
  - Mayor: Kiista P. Isaksen

Population (2025)
  - Total: 3,055
- Time zone: UTC−02:00 (Western Greenland Time)
  - Summer (DST): UTC−01:00 (Western Greenland Summer Time)
- Postal code: 3920
- Website: qaqortoq.gl

Qaqortoq (Greenlandic pronunciation: [qɑqɔttɔq]), also known as Julianehåb, is the capital city of the Kujalleq municipality in southern Greenland, located near Cape Thorvaldsen. With a population of 3,069 in 2025, it is the most populous town in Kujalleq and the fourth most in Greenland.

== History ==
The area around Qaqortoq has been inhabited since prehistoric times. Beginning with the Saqqaq culture roughly 4,300 years ago, the area has had a continuous human presence.

=== Saqqaq culture ===
The earliest signs of population presence are from roughly 4,300 years ago. While Saqqaq-era sites are generally the most numerous of all the prehistoric sites in Greenland, around Qaqortoq the Saqqaq presence is less prominent, with only sporadic sites and items such as chipped stone drills and carving knives.

=== Dorset culture ===
The Dorset people arrived in the Qaqortoq area around 2,800 years ago. Several rectangular peat dwelling structures, characteristic of the early Dorset culture, can be found around the wider Qaqortoq area.

=== Norse culture ===
Written records of South Greenland history begin with the arrival of the Norse in the late 10th century. The ruins of Hvalsey – the most prominent Norse ruins in Greenland – are located 19 kilometers (12 mi) northeast of Qaqortoq. General or even limited trade between the Norse and the Thule people was scarce. Except a few novel and exotic items found at Thule sites in the area, evidence suggests cultural exchange was initially sporadic. Later, the south Greenland Norse adopted trade with the southern Inuit and were for a time the major supplier of ivory to northern Europe. The Norse era lasted for almost five hundred years, ending in the mid-15th century. The last written record of the Norse presence is of a wedding in the Hvalseyjarfjord church in 1408.

=== Thule people ===
The Thule culture Inuit arrived in southern Greenland and the Qaqortoq area around the 12th century and were contemporaneous with the Norse. However, there exists little evidence of early contact. The Thule culture was characterized by a subsistence existence and there are few, if any, dwellings of considerable structure to be found from the era. Items, however, are relatively numerous.

=== Colonial era until present ===
The present-day town was founded in 1775 by the Dano-Norwegian trader Anders Olsen, on behalf of the General Trading Company. The town was christened Julianehaab after the Danish queen Juliane Marie, although it sometimes mistakenly appears as "Julianshaab". The name was also sometimes anglicized as Juliana's Hope. The town became a major center for the harp seal trade and today remains the home of the Great Greenland sealskin tannery.

Until 31 December 2008 the town was the administrative center of Qaqortoq municipality. On 1 January 2009 Qaqortoq became the biggest town and the administrative center of Kujalleq municipality, when the three municipalities of South Greenland, meaning Qaqortoq, Narsaq, and Nanortalik were merged into one municipality.

== Landmarks ==
=== Historical buildings ===
The building that now houses the Qaqortoq museum was originally the town's blacksmith's shop. The house was built in yellow stone and dates back to 1804.

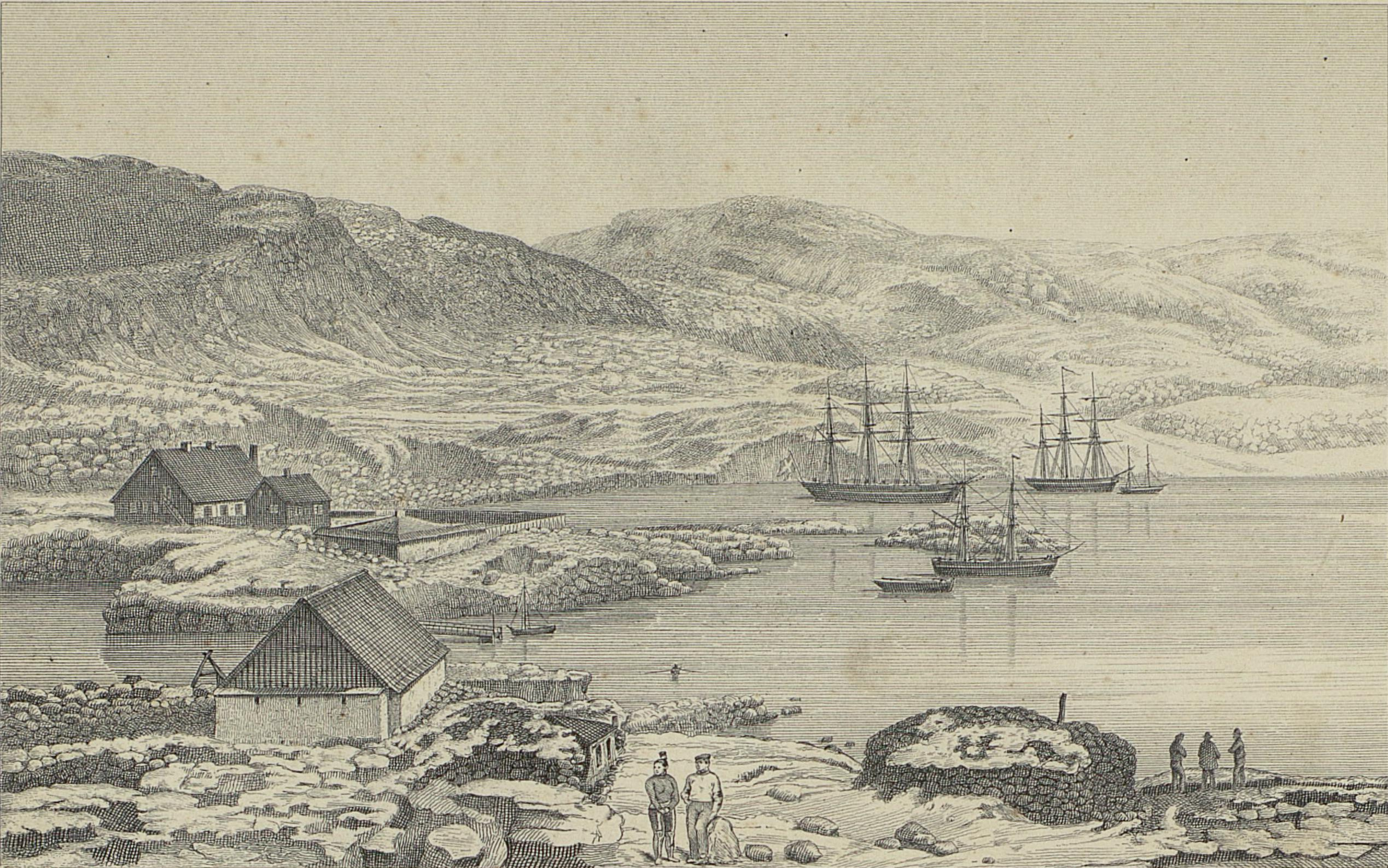
Qaqortoq (Julianehaab) in 1860.

The oldest standing building at the historical colonial harbor – and thus of all of Qaqortoq – is a black-tarred log building from 1797. The building was designed by royal Danish architect Kirkerup, pre-assembled in Denmark, shipped in pieces to Qaqortoq, and then reassembled.

=== Stone & Man ===
Qaqortoq is a town of artists and talented craftsmen. From 1993 to 1994 Qaqortoq artist Aka Høegh and other 18 Nordic artists presided over the Stone & Man project, designed to transform the town into an open air art gallery. Eighteen artists from Finland, Sweden, Norway, Iceland and Greenland carved 24 sculptures into the rock faces and boulders in the town. Today there are over 40 sculptures in the town, all part of the Stone & Man exhibit.

=== The fountain ===
The town is home to the oldest fountain in Greenland, Mindebrønden, finished in 1932. It was the only fountain in the country prior to another in Sisimiut. A tourist attraction, the fountain depicts whales spouting water out of their blowholes.

== Transport ==
=== Air ===
Qaqortoq Airport opened in 2026, linking Qaqortoq with domestic destinations and Iceland, as well as helicopter flights to other smaller towns and settlements in southern Greenland. The airport is located around 5 km north of the town. The airport replaced the previous Qaqortoq Heliport which necessitated transfers by helicopter with passengers continuing their onward journey from Narsarsuaq Airport.

=== Land ===
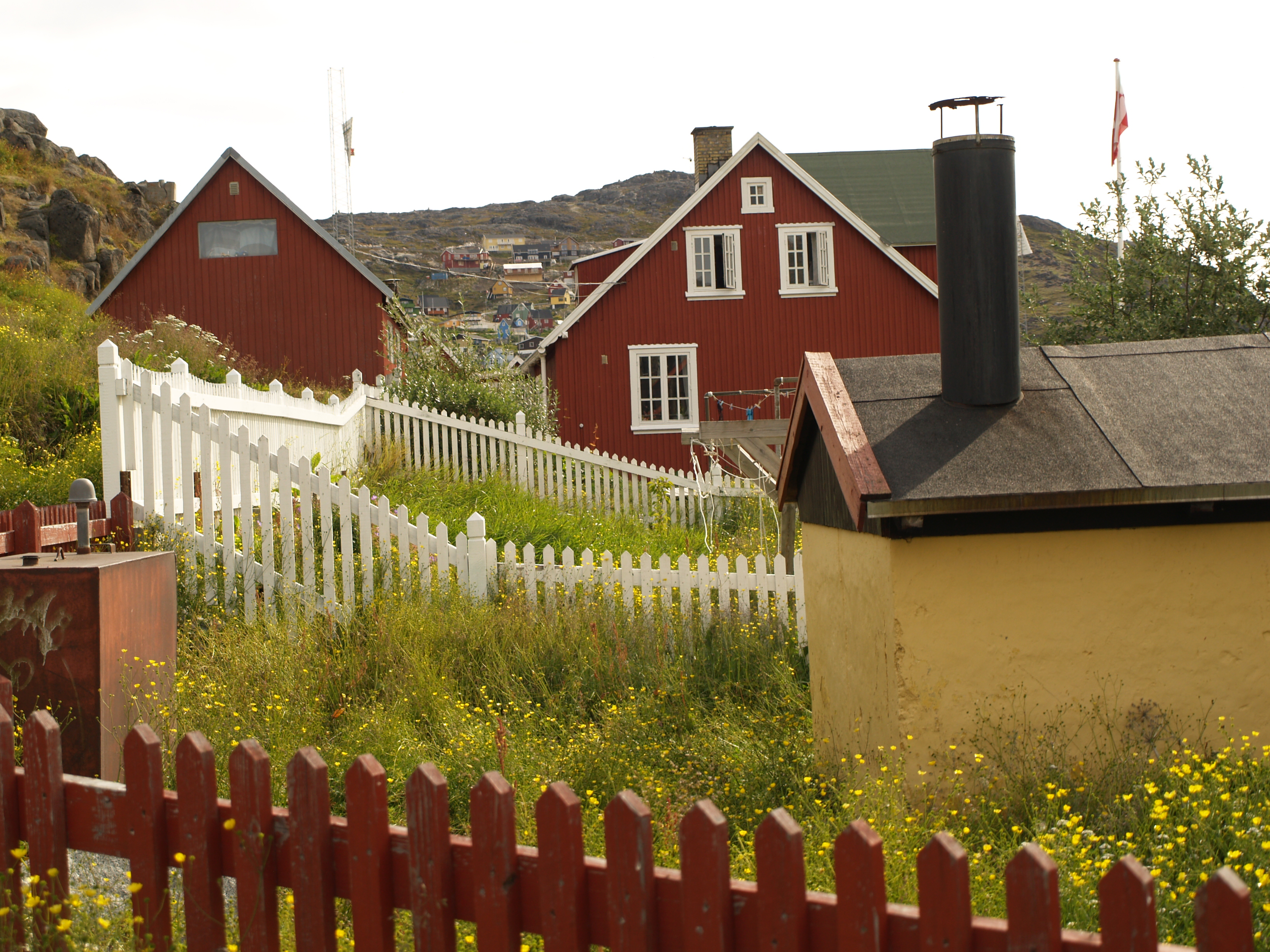
Qaqortoq in summer

As is true of all populated places in Greenland, Qaqortoq is not connected to any other place via roads. Fairly well trodden hiking trails lead north and west from the town, but for any motorised transportation all terrain vehicles are needed. During winter, snowmobiles become the transport of choice. There are few populated destinations to reach by land since no other developed settlements are situated on the Qaqortoq peninsula. Boats have always been the main mode of transport in Greenland.

=== Sea ===
Qaqortoq is a port of call for the Arctic Umiaq ferry. The port authority for Qaqortoq is Royal Arctic Line, located in Nuuk. With a channel depth of 50 feet (15 m), the port can accommodate vessels up to 500 feet (150 m) in length. The port offers pilotage upon request, but no tug boat services.

The port of Qaqortoq, situated close to the southern tip of Greenland, is an important cruise destination of the North Atlantic, having 30-40 calls per season, often large cruise ships transferring in late summer / early autumn from North Europe to the Caribbean.

In 2025, a decision was made to construct an deepwater port in Qaqortoq, financed by the Danish state.

== Economy and infrastructure ==
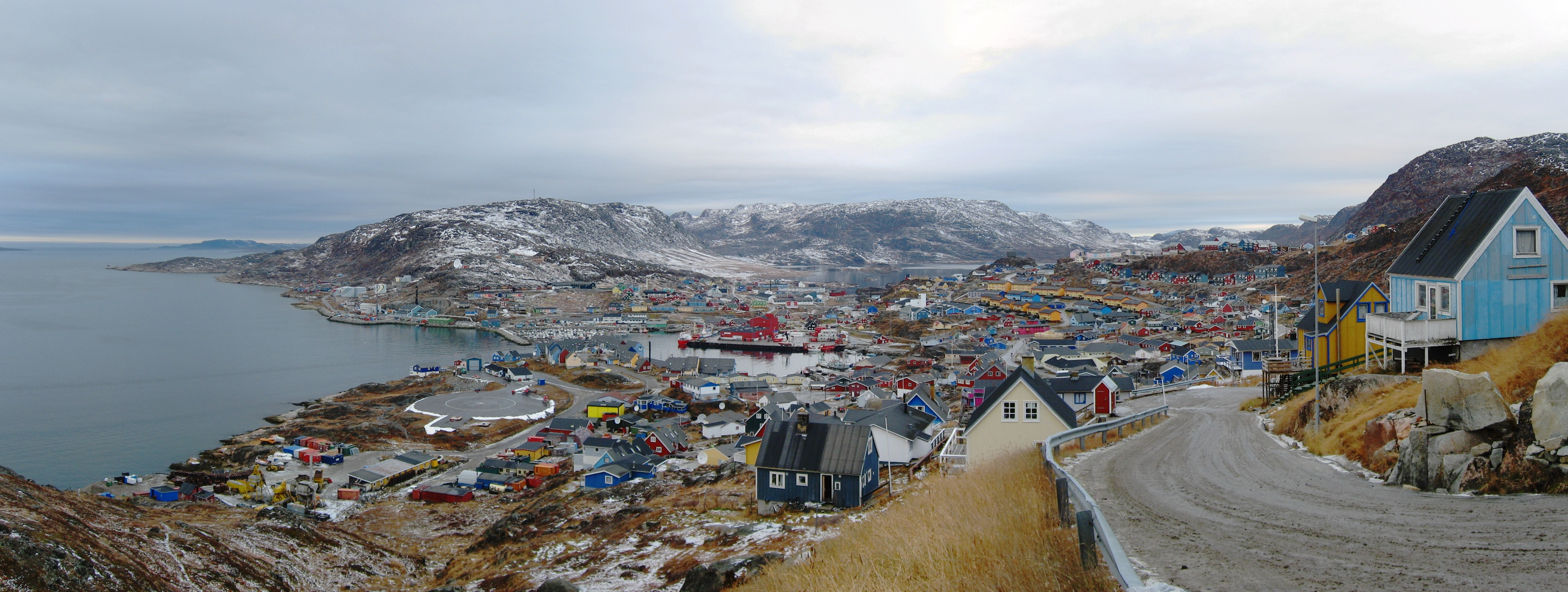
Autumn in Qaqortoq

Qaqortoq is a seaport and the centre of South Greenland. Fish processing, tourism, tanning, fur production, and ship maintenance and repair are important activities, but the economy is based primarily on educational and administrative services. The primary industries in the town are fishing, service, and administration.

The native subsistence economy was long preserved by the former monopoly Royal Greenland Trading Department, which used the town as a source of saddle-back seal skins. The Great Greenland Furhouse is the only tannery in Greenland and the primary sealskin purchaser on the island; it remains one of the major employers in the town.

Agriculture, mainly as sheep farming, cattle and reindeer herding, are conducted on a number of farms in the fiord landscapes close to Qaqortoq. Qaqortoq is an important service provider and supply centre for the farmers.

Of all exports produced in Qaqortoq, 70.1% are headed for the Danish market.

Qaqortoq is located in one of the most mineral rich areas in the world, South Greenland having a wide range of mineral deposits. Mining has been a major economic activity in South Greenland in the past, especially the nearby Ivittuut mine north of Qaqortoq. A gold mine was operating from 2003 to 2013 in Nalunaq, south of Qaqortoq. The gold mine is expected to reopen in 2022.

The Tanbreez multielement project, situated less than 20 kilometers east of Qaqortoq, was granted an exploitation licence in 2020, and a major mine is expected to be established within a few years.

Qaqortoq is connected by the fibre submarine communications cable Greenland Connect to Nuuk and Iceland, operated by Tusass. It was put into operation in 2009.

=== Employment ===
During the summer of 2020, the unemployment rate in Qaqortoq was at 7%, a rather high level compared to for instance Nuuk, the capital of Greenland. The level of unemployment in Qaqortoq has during the last decade been declining.

=== Energy ===
All of Qaqortoq's electricity is supplied by the government-owned company Nukissiorfiit. Since 2007, Qaqortoq gets its electric power mainly from Qorlortorsuaq Dam by way of a 70-kilometer (43 mi) 70 kV powerline. Previously the town's electricity was supplied by means of so-called "bunker fuel generators", three diesel ship engines converted to electricity production.

=== Education ===
Qaqortoq is the main center for education in South Greenland and has a primary school, middle school, and high school, a folk high school which started as a workers' college (Sulisartut Højskoliat) in 1977, a school of commerce, and a basic vocational school.

=== Religion ===
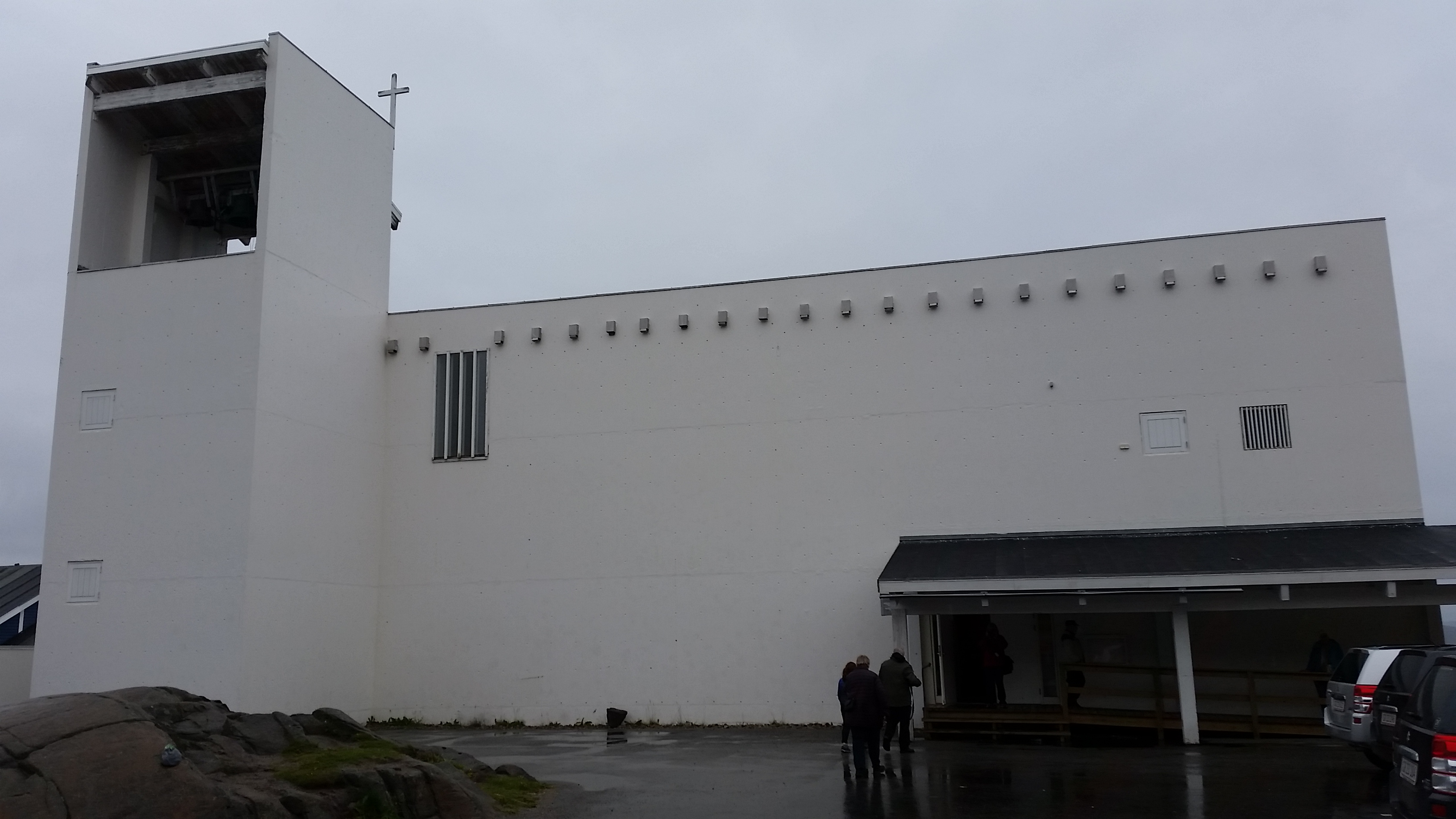
Gertrud Rasch's Church

==== Gertrud Rasch's Church ====
Gertrud Rasch's Church (Danish: "Gertrud Rasks Kirke") is a white concrete Lutheran church. The church is named after Gertrud Rask, the wife of missionary Hans Egede. Due to the increasing population in Qaqortoq, the old church could no longer adequately serve the community, and a new church was commissioned by the Church of Denmark. Construction started in May 1972 and it was consecrated on 8 July 1973. It was designed by architect Ole Nielsen, and is made entirely of concrete. The church has a concrete altar. The motif of the altarpiece is based upon south Greenland flora. The church features a ten-stop Frobenius organ from 1973.

=== Healthcare ===
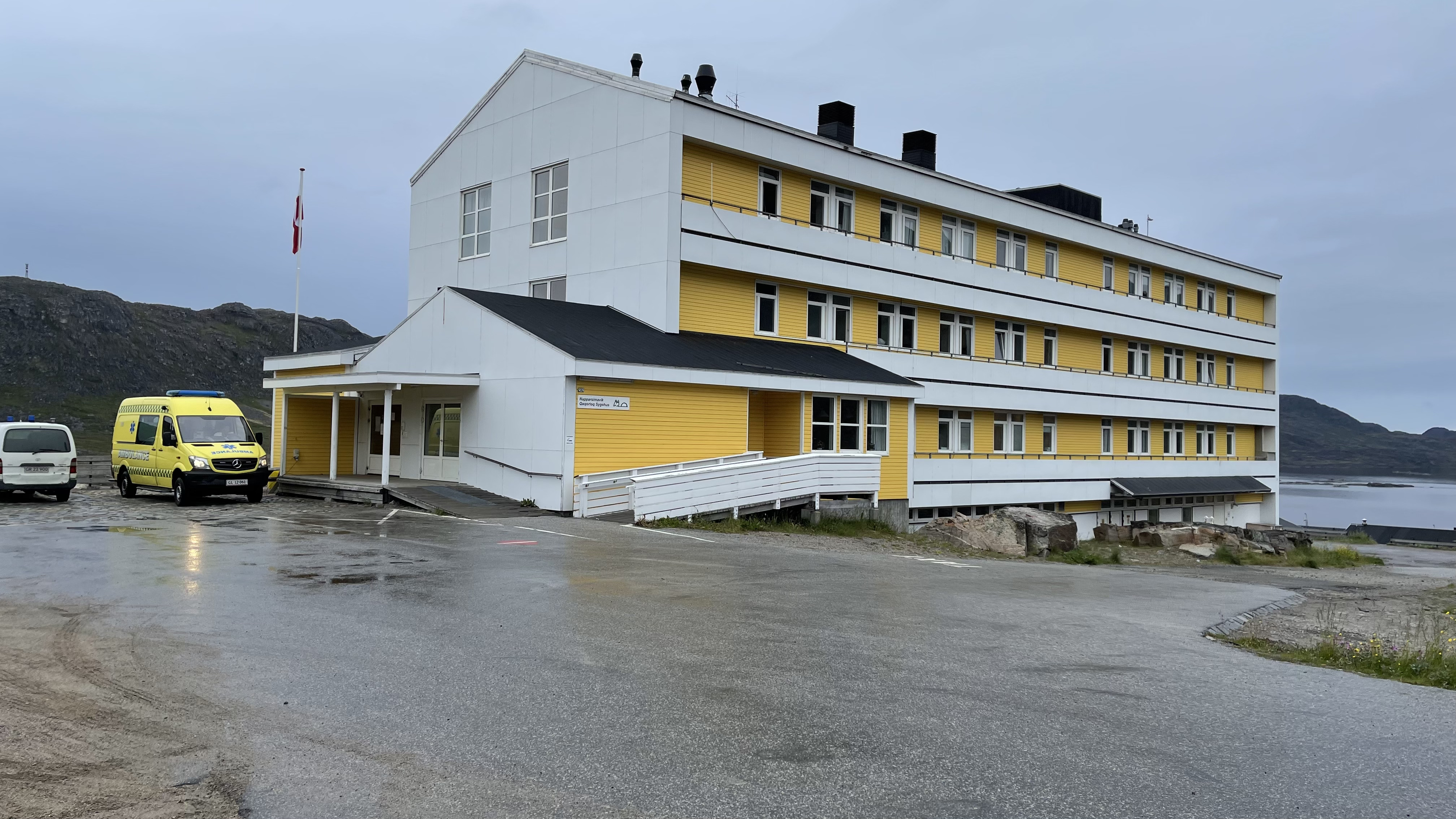
Qaqortoq Regional Hospital

Qaqortoq is served by Napparsimavik Hospital, officially Napparsimavik Qaqortoq Sygehus. The hospital is also the main hospital in southern Greenland. With a staff of 59 people, presently the hospital has 18 beds. The three villages in Qaqortoq municipality – Eqalugaarsuit, Saarloq, and Qassimiut – also belong to the healthcare district of Napparsimavik Hospital. The villages are visited via sea and with a medical helicopter in case of emergencies. During the summer of 2010, the hospital used Greenland-grown vegetables exclusively.

=== Tourism ===
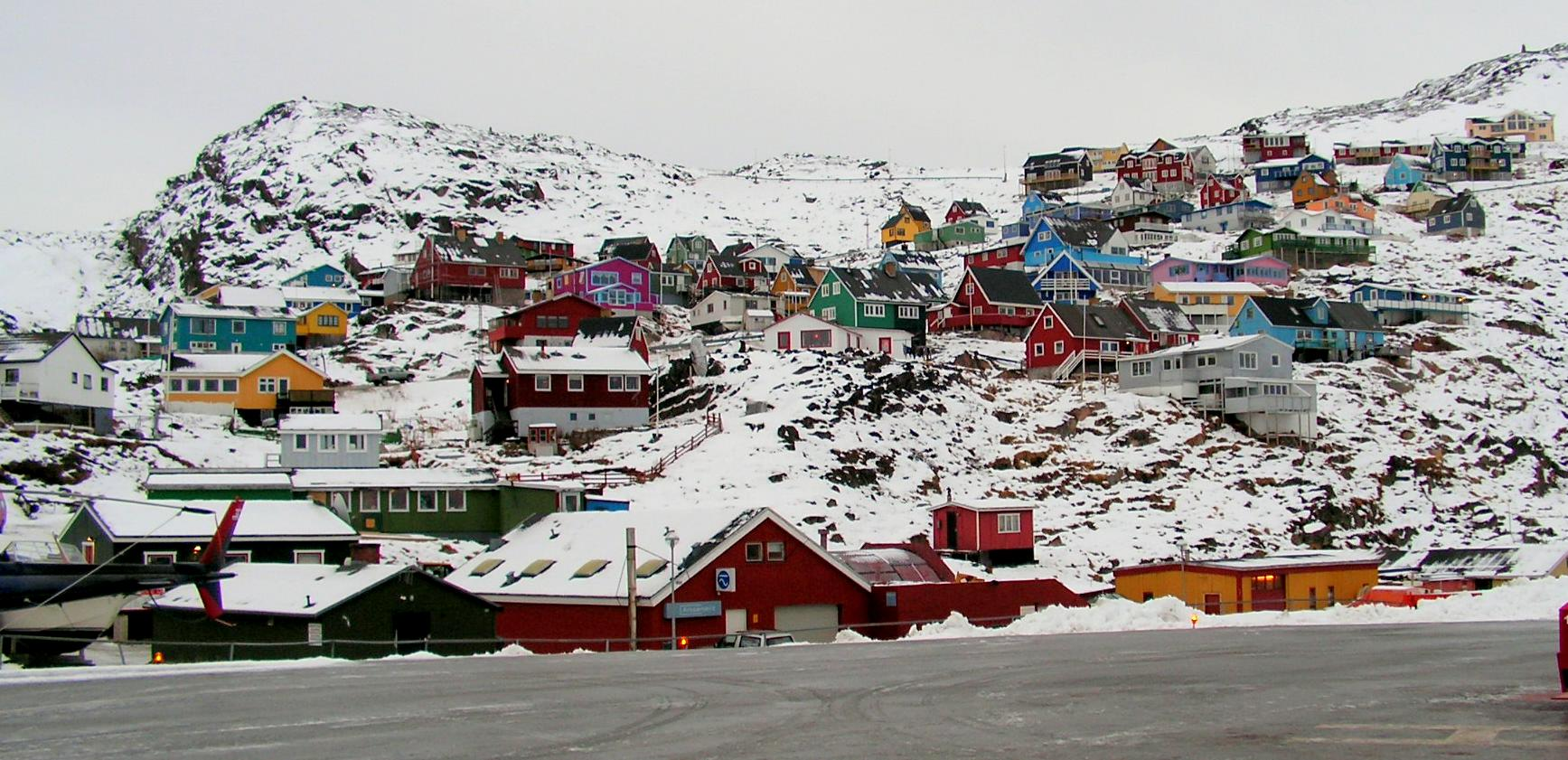
Qaqortoq in winter

Tourism is a significant contributor to the economy of the town. The Qaqortoq Tourist Service – Greenland Sagalands A/S – is the main local cruise operator and tourist office. The main foundation for tourism in town is the cruise tourism, Qaqortoq being the main cruise destination in Greenland with more than 35 cruise calls per season and +30,000 cruise visitors. The cruise tourists are a wide range of nationalities, with Germans, British and Americans as major groups.

Roughly two-thirds of all non-cruise tourists (65.5%) are from Denmark. There are several facilities offering accommodations, including the Qaqortoq Hostel. The Qaqortoq Museum offers services in English, Danish, and Kalaallisut. The Great Greenland Furhouse is also a popular tourist attraction.

Tourists are offered by the tourist office activities such as kayaking, guided hiking, whale-watching, tours to the Greenland ice cap, Norse ruins, farms, the Uunartoq hot springs and general boating. In recent years, Qaqortoq has experienced a decline in tourist revenue, beside cruise tourism, with an average of 1,700 tourists annually staying in the town overnight, very much due to the lack of an airport close to the town. The Qaqortoq Stadium is the first artificial grass football stadium in Greenland. The Danish Crown Princely family visited the town as part of an official tour of Greenland in summer 2014. A small grove of hardy poplar trees was planted by the Crown Prince family.

== Demographics ==
With 3,050 inhabitants as of 2020, Qaqortoq is the largest town in the Kujalleq municipality. The population has declined by around 500 inhabitants from early 2000's.

There exists no gender imbalance among native Greenlanders in Qaqortoq, the only gender inequity is among inhabitants born outside Greenland, with 3 out of 5 being male. As of 2011 10% of the town's inhabitants were born outside Greenland, a decline from 20% in 1991, but an increase from a 9% low in 2001.

== Geography ==
Qaqortoq is located at approximately 60°43′20″N 46°02′25″W in the Qaqortoq Fjord, beside the Labrador Sea.

=== Climate ===
Qaqortoq has a maritime-influenced polar climate (ET) with cold, snowy winters and cool summers. The southern tip of Greenland does not experience permafrost. Thanks to its relative warmth compared to other settlements, few groves of trees can now thrive and survive under sheltered locations, making Qaqortoq one of the few Greenlandic towns able to sustain such an environment. Winters are much milder than at much lower coastal parallels in continental North America due to the marine effect. Therefore, the seasonal variation in the climate is very small for a location so far north.

Climate data for Qaqortoq, Greenland (57 m asl, normals 1991–2020, extremes 1961–2020)
Month	Jan	Feb	Mar	Apr	May	Jun	Jul	Aug	Sep	Oct	Nov	Dec	Year
Record high °C (°F)	12.3 (54.1)	12.0 (53.6)	12.5 (54.5)	14.0 (57.2)	21.8 (71.2)	20.0 (68.0)	21.7 (71.1)	23.0 (73.4)	21.6 (70.9)	17.8 (64.0)	13.7 (56.7)	12.0 (53.6)	23.0 (73.4)
Mean daily maximum °C (°F)	−1.9 (28.6)	−2.5 (27.5)	−1.1 (30.0)	3.4 (38.1)	6.7 (44.1)	9.8 (49.6)	11.7 (53.1)	11.2 (52.2)	8.7 (47.7)	4.8 (40.6)	0.9 (33.6)	−1.0 (30.2)	4.2 (39.6)
Daily mean °C (°F)	−4.9 (23.2)	−5.5 (22.1)	−4.1 (24.6)	0.4 (32.7)	3.4 (38.1)	6.2 (43.2)	8.1 (46.6)	8.1 (46.6)	5.9 (42.6)	2.3 (36.1)	−1.7 (28.9)	−3.7 (25.3)	1.2 (34.2)
Mean daily minimum °C (°F)	−7.8 (18.0)	−8.6 (16.5)	−7.4 (18.7)	−2.7 (27.1)	0.2 (32.4)	2.7 (36.9)	4.6 (40.3)	5.3 (41.5)	3.5 (38.3)	−0.1 (31.8)	−4.0 (24.8)	−6.4 (20.5)	−1.7 (28.9)
Record low °C (°F)	−30.0 (−22.0)	−25.2 (−13.4)	−26.0 (−14.8)	−16.4 (2.5)	−12.8 (9.0)	−6.0 (21.2)	−2.4 (27.7)	−3.4 (25.9)	−8.5 (16.7)	−11.0 (12.2)	−18.0 (−0.4)	−21.6 (−6.9)	−30.0 (−22.0)
Average precipitation mm (inches)	75.6 (2.98)	77.7 (3.06)	63.8 (2.51)	66.7 (2.63)	58.3 (2.30)	69.3 (2.73)	81.6 (3.21)	103.0 (4.06)	116.2 (4.57)	88.8 (3.50)	100.6 (3.96)	70.1 (2.76)	971.7 (38.27)
Average precipitation days (≥ 1 mm)	10.2	9.5	8.3	7.2	7.3	8.4	8.4	9.9	11.1	8.7	9.6	9.3	107.9
Average relative humidity (%)	66.5	67.8	65.8	70.7	75.8	79.7	81.8	84.9	77.8	67.5	72.6	70.1	73.4
Source: Danish Meteorological Institute; raw data (humidity 2004–17)

== Twin Town ==
Qaqortoq is twinned with:

- Aarhus, Denmark

== Foreign Relation ==
Qaqortoq has a consulate from the government of Latvia, representing Latvia for Greenland.
