= Saabye =

Saabye is a surname. Notable people with the surname include:

- August Saabye (1823–1916), Danish sculptor
- Hans Egede Saabye (1746–1817), Danish priest and missionary
