= College of Missions =

Dano-Norwegian Christian missions organization

The College of Missions (Danish: Missionskollegiet; Latin: Collegium de cursu Evangelii promovendo) or Royal Mission College (Kongelige Missions-Kollegium) was a Dano-Norwegian association based in Copenhagen which funded and directed Protestant missions under royal patronage. Along with the Moravian church, it was the first large-scale Protestant mission effort.

== History ==
The college was established by Frederick IV in 1714 to institutionalise the work he began by funding Bartholomäus Ziegenbalg and Heinrich Pluetschau's mission at the Danish colony of Fort Dansborg (Tranquebar) in India. Among its first efforts were funding missions in Lapland and Hans Egede's Bergen Greenland Company, which established the Island of Hope mission in 1721. Two child converts from the mission would later inspire Count von Zinzendorf to begin the Moravian missions.

Its first chairman (præses) was Johan Georg von Holstein (16 February 1662 – 26 December 1730), who was the namesake for Holsteinsborg (now Sisimiut) in Greenland.

Work among the Sami (Finnemisjon) was initiated under the pietist Thomas von Westen (1682–1727) in 1716. He swiftly established thirteen stations before his death.

Work in Greenland was directed first by Hans Egede and then, after the death of his wife, his son Paul. It was administered in conjunction with the Moravian missions there and the various chartered companies, particularly the Royal Greenland Trading Department. Early on, the well-endowed college could provide an extensive scientific library to missionaries like Hans Glahn, Otto Fabricius, and Andreas Ginge who studied the flora, fauna, and meteorology of Greenland during their missions. Money was so limited in the later 18th century that all but five missionaries were returned to Denmark in 1792 and British hostility during the Napoleonic Wars brought the number down to a single person.

Most of the college's early records were destroyed in a Copenhagen fire between 5 and 7 June 1795. The college was closed down on 17 June 1859 by Frederik VII and its remaining activities were transferred to the Ministry of Culture.

== Sami mission ==
As of the royal decree of 19 April 1715, the College of Missions was also the main organisation for missions work among the Sami in Norway. For the first ten to twelve years, the work was led by Thomas von Westen.

The College of Missions received a royal allocation of 2000 rigsdaler; in addition, the college was allowed to take over the 1000 rigsdaler the churches in Finnmark had in capital. Additionally, it was determined in 1716–1718 that all main churches in the country would give two rigsdaler yearly to the missions work in Finnmark; annex churches would give one. Furthermore, the income of the churches in Helgeland would also go towards the mission. In 1720, the income from the churches in Vesterålen, Salten, and Lofoten was added to the mission. The most important source of the churches' income came from the construction of farms the churches owned in the district.

After the College of Missions was subordinated to the chancery, the properties the churches owned were transferred to the Nordland Church and School Fund.

The College of Missions employed missionaries and teachers, and operated schools and churches in Sami areas. The mission closed down following the dissolution of the union between Denmark-Norway in 1814.

Norway was split into thirteen missionary districts, at the most:

- East Finnmark (missionaries active from 1716 to 1808)
- Vest-Finnmark (missionaries active from 1716 to 1747)
- Porsanger (missionaries active from 1716 to ca. 1805)
- Skjervøy and Kvænangen (missionaries active from 1718 to 1814)
- Karlsøy, Lyngen, and Ulsfjord (missionaries active from 1718 to 1789)
- Senja and Vesterålen (missionaries active from 1718 to 1788)
- Lødingen (missionaries active from 1721 to ca. 1814)
- Saltdalen (missionaries active from 1721 to 1780)
- Gildeskål (missionaries active from 1721 to 1779)
- Rana (missionaries active from 1726 to ca. 1752)
- Vefsn (missionaries active from 1717 to 1771)
- Overhalla (missionaries active from 1721 to 1803)
- Snåsa (missionaries active from 1719 to 1774)

== See also ==
- Tranquebar Mission
- Hans Egede
- Jacob Peter Mynster
- Moravian missions in Greenland
