= Gertrud Rask =

Norwegian missionary to Greenland

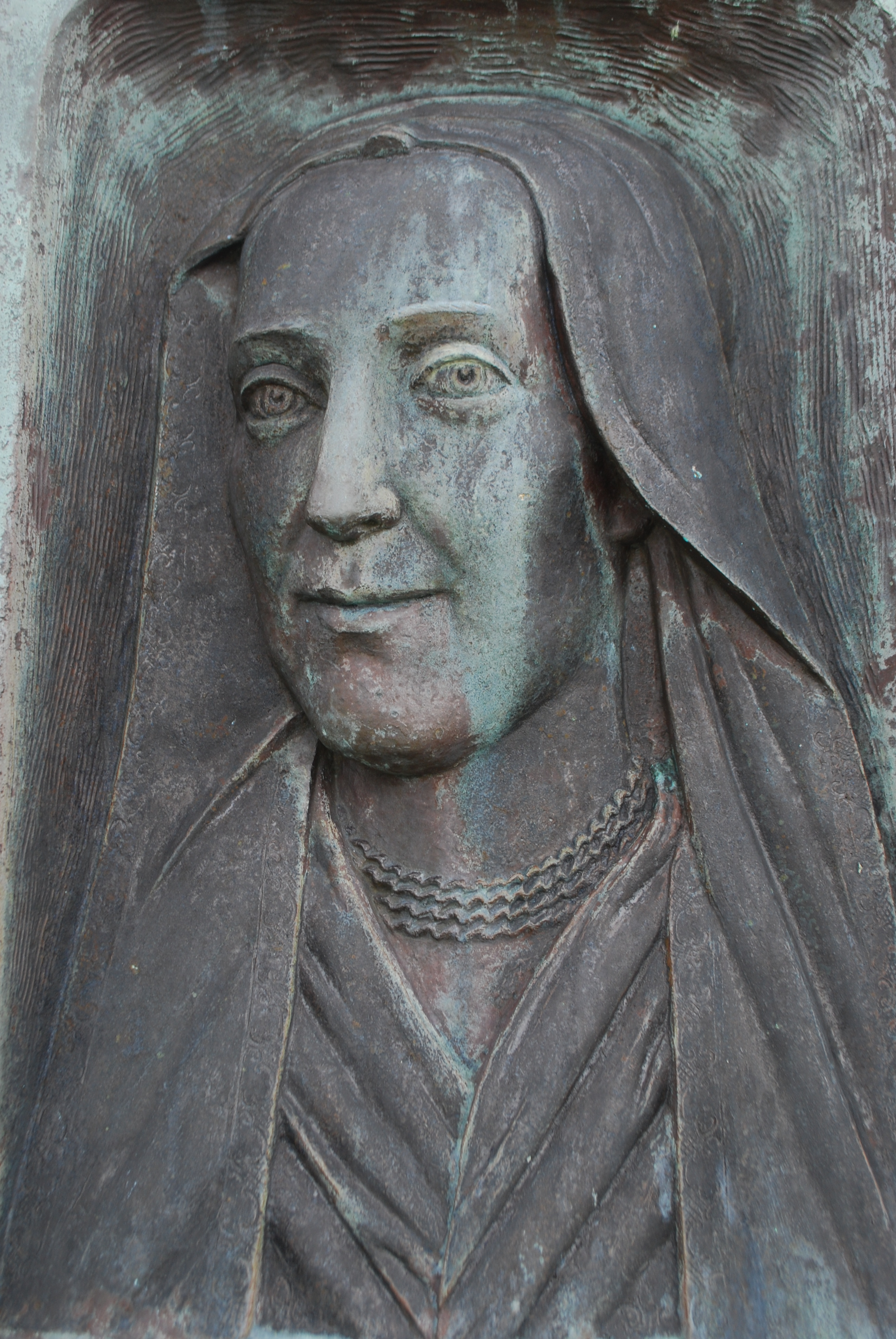
- Born: 1673
- Died: 21 December 1735
- Spouse: Hans Egede

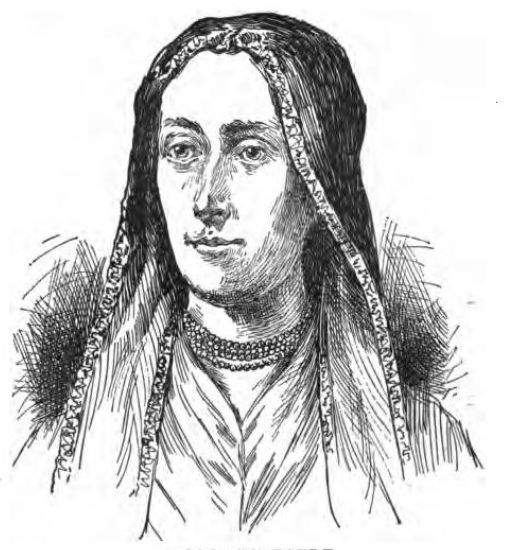
Gertrud Rask Egede

Gertrud Rask (1673 – 21 December 1735) was the first wife of the Danish-Norwegian missionary to Greenland Hans Egede and was the mother of the missionary and translator Paul Egede.

== Life in Norway ==
Gertrud Rask (the parish register records her as Gjertrud Nilsdatter Rasch) was born on the island of Kveøya in Troms county, Norway, the third of six children of Niels Nielsen Rasch (1641–1704) and Nille Nilsdatter (d. 1716). Growing up in the harsh climate of northern Norway, she was 34 when she married Hans Egede, the 21-year-old pastor of Vågan Church in the Lofoten archipelago. They had four children : Sons- Poul (1709–1789) & Niels (1710–1782); Daughters- Kirstine Matthea (1715–1786) and Petronelle (1716–1805).

Her husband's determination to establish a Greenland mission had become firm by 1710 at the latest; Gertrud Rask Egede strongly resisted his plan initially, but eventually she bent to his will after he promised not to go to Greenland without her.

== Mission to Greenland ==
In 1718, the couple and their children moved to Bergen, whence – at the conclusion of the Great Northern War – they set sail for Greenland on 12 May 1721, arriving at Baal's River (the modern Nuup Kangerlua) on the southwest coast on 3 July. Hope Colony (Haabets Koloni) was established on Kangeq Island at the mouth of the fjord; the remains of the house where the family lived together with (initially) about 25 other people are still preserved. The settlement was moved to the mainland and renamed Godthaab by the royal governor Claus Paarss in 1728.

Despite her strong Pietist bias, Gertrud supported her husband's missionary work among the Inuit, working among them as a nurse. In 1733, the Moravian missionaries Christian Stach, Matthias Stach, and Christian David arrived and began the settlement that would become first New Herrnhut and then Nuuk. Also with them, however, was one of Hans Egede's child converts who had been sent to Denmark to participate in the festivities around the coronation of Christian VI: the child had contracted smallpox and spread the disease to the defenseless Inuit, thousands of whom died over the next two years. Gertrud Egede worked among them, but finally succumbed herself in 1735.

In 1736, her husband left the island in the care of his son Poul and returned her body to Denmark for burial at the St. Nikolai Church in Copenhagen (now Kunsthallen Nikolaj) where Egede himself was buried upon his death in 1758.

== Legacy ==
Gertrud Rask Land in Greenland, roads in both Greenland and Denmark, a church in Qaqortoq (then known as Julianehåb), a children's home and a restaurant in Nuuk have all been named after Gertrud Rask.

An icebreaking steamship, the Gertrude Rask, was launched in Nakskov, Denmark in 1923. The 47-metre ship was used for Greenlandic trade and for several exploration trips from Copenhagen to Greenland, but sank off Nova Scotia in 1942.
