= Kingittoq =

Mountain in Greenland

Coordinates: 60.7°N 46.3°W

Kingittoq (old spelling: Kingigtoĸ) is a sheep-farming settlement in the Qaqortoq district of the Kujalleq municipality in southern Greenland.

== Location ==
Kingittoq is located at the eastern tip of an island of the same name, approximately 12 km west of Qaqortoq.

== History ==
Kingittoq was settled in 1965.

== Demographics ==
Between 1977 and 2013, Kingittoq consistently had one resident. Population data for sheep-farming settlements was last recorded in 2013. Kingittoq is statistically listed under "Farms near Qaqortoq".
