= Qaqortoq Museum =

Coordinates: 60°43′06″N 46°02′15″W

- Kalaallit Nunaanni Katersugaasiviit
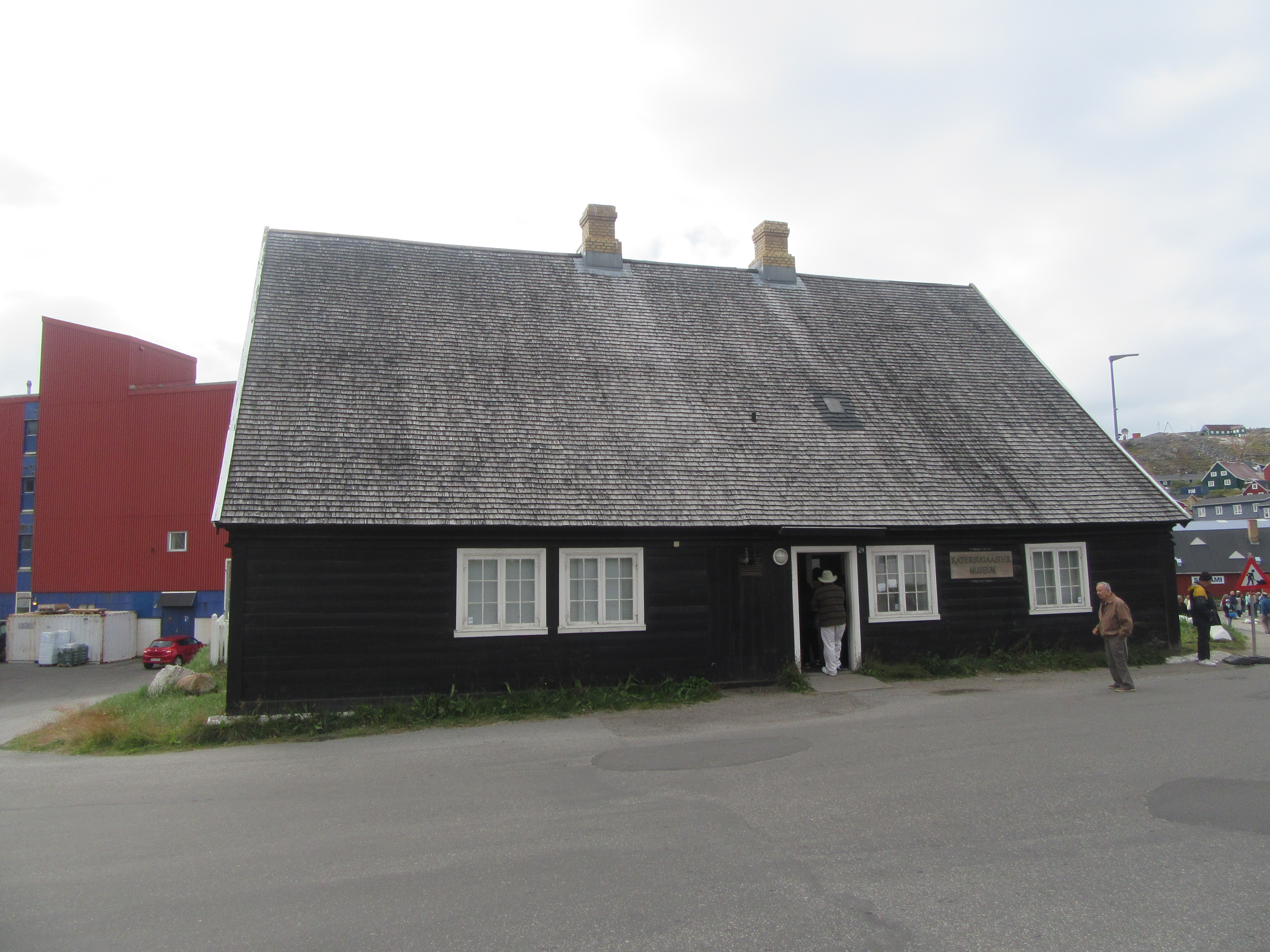
- Location: Box 154; Torvevej B-29; 3920 Qaqortoq
- Type: History museum
- Director: Dan Ullerup
- Website: www.museum.gl/uk/qaqortoq

Qaqortoq Museum (Greenlandic: Kalaallit Nunaanni Katersugaasiviit) is a museum in Qaqortoq, Greenland. It is located close to the main fountain square in one of the oldest buildings of the town, the former Royal Greenland Trading Department which dates from 1804. The museum exhibits old Inuit boats, hunting equipment, national dresses and Norse artifacts.

The museum is a member of NUKAKA, the association of Greenlandic museums. Museum Director is Dan Ullerup.

== Exhibits ==
=== Permanent exhibits ===
The Dorset culture, the Thule culture, and the Norse culture all have their separate, permanent exhibits.

One of the features is the reconstructed "red room" and "blue room", where polar explorer Knud Rasmussen and the aviator Charles Lindbergh have slept. Much of the Inuit culture can be seen around this area along with the old brewery and the old meeting hall.

=== Temporary exhibits ===
The museum also exhibits artworks and other expos. Among former temporary displays are Greenlandic artist Aka Høegh that held an art exhibition, displaying the latest works. The art exhibition was opened by Qaqortoq mayor Simon Simonsen.

== Current developments ==
In 2006 the museum started constructing an umiac, a traditional Greenlandic boat. The project was done in cooperation with Northern Coastal Experience.
