= Arnarsaq =

Greenlandic Inuk missionary

Arnarsaq (c. 1716 – fl. 1778), was an Inuk translator, interpreter, and Christian convert who lived in what is now modern-day Greenland. She is particularly known for her work with the Danish theologian Paul Egede. Alongside Hans Punngujooq, Arnarsaq helped Egede translate the New Testament into Greenlandic. She had an important position in the Danish missions among the Inuit on Greenland in the 18th century, and has also been portrayed in fiction.

== Life ==
Arnarsaq came and asked to be taught how to come to the Christian God; she converted and was baptized in 1737, and was allowed to keep her original name instead of being given a name from the Bible at her baptism, which was unusual. She is described as a critical debate partner of Egede. In her Bible translation, she prevented censorship and was able to present it the way she saw it: her interpretation of Christianity is considered to have had a large impact upon the version of Christianity accepted by the Inuit. She followed Egede to Denmark in 1740. She visited the Danish royal court in 1740, where she was presented with an Inuk boy to the court as a curiosity. In 1741, she was sent as a missionary to Greenland, where she rivalled the missionaries of the Moravian Church.

In 1743, she retired to her home in the Disko area for twenty years. She was not popular among the Inuit, lecturing them about how they should live according to the Christian faith. She never married. From 1763, she was again the interpreter and assistant to the Danish mission. She had an important and influential position among the missionaries, as she was the link between them and the Inuit, whose language they could not understand. The year of her death is unknown; the last year she is mentioned is 1778.

== Legacy ==
Arnarsaq is one of a few Inuit, and the only female Inuk of her time, to be mentioned in Danish history. Arnarsaq is portrayed in the novel of B. S. Ingemann, Kunuk og Naja (1842), which was written with support of the reports of the missionaries: in the novel, she is described as a religious old woman, pointed out by the Inuit as an Ilisiitsoq; a witch.
