= Paul Egede =

Dano-Norwegian theologian (1708–1789)

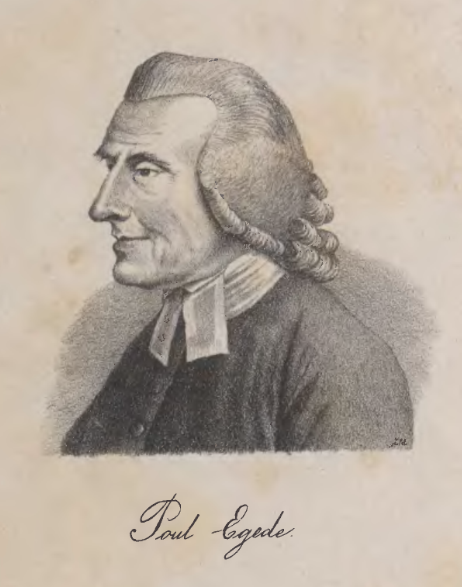
Paul Hansen Egede

Paul or Poul Hansen Egede (9 September 1708 – 6 June 1789) was a Dano-Norwegian theologian, missionary, and scholar who was principally concerned with the Lutheran mission among the Kalaallit people in Greenland that had been established by his father, Hans, in 1721.

== Biography ==
Egede was born in Kabelvåg, a village in the parish of Vågan, Norway, on the southern shore of the island of Austvågøya. He was the older son of the village minister Hans Egede and his wife Gertrud Rask. Hans became dedicated to the cause of restoring contact with and missionizing among the Norsemen of the lost Greenland colony, who were presumed to have remained Catholic following the Reformation. He parlayed support among Norwegian merchants and the Danish Mission College into the establishment of the Bergen Greenland Company, which equipped three ships which left Bergen in 1721. A few months later, the Egede family and about forty other colonists landed on the Island of Hope (modern Kangeq) at the mouth of the fjord which houses today's Nuuk. Scurvy broke out and most returned home as quickly as possible, but the natives proved generally curious and helpful. No Norse survivors were found and Hans's company went bankrupt in 1727, but he and his family learned the local Inuit dialect and began a Christian mission among them.

Paul assisted his father in his work and, when his mother died and Hans returned to bury her in Denmark after a smallpox outbreak, he took over the mission for an additional six years, accepting to forgo his own desire to become a Danish naval officer. He succeeded his father as superintendent of the Greenland mission. The Lutheran mission was not as successful as the Moravian missions in Greenland, but the expansion of colonies and trading outposts under Jacob Severin's company and the General Trade Company was always eventually followed by a chapel or church at the site. Egede was also an accomplished botanist.

In 1742, Egede was appointed Minister of the Vartov Lutheran Church in Copenhagen. In 1747, he became a professor of theology at the Greenland Mission Seminary established in Denmark by his father and then, in 1758, its provost. In 1779, he was elevated to Bishop of Greenland and, in 1785, made a fellow of the Royal Norwegian Society of Sciences and Letters.

Egede and a kalaaleq woman named Arnarsaq translated the New Testament into Kalaallisut, the language of the West Greenland Inuit. He went on to publish a Kalaallisut–Danish–Latin dictionary (1750), a revised Kalaallisut catechism (1756), and a Kalaallisut grammar (1760), as well as a number of other books concerning the language.

Paul Egede died in Copenhagen in 1789, having published in that year his journal of his life in Greenland.
