= Aron of Kangeq =

Greenlandic artist (1822–1869)

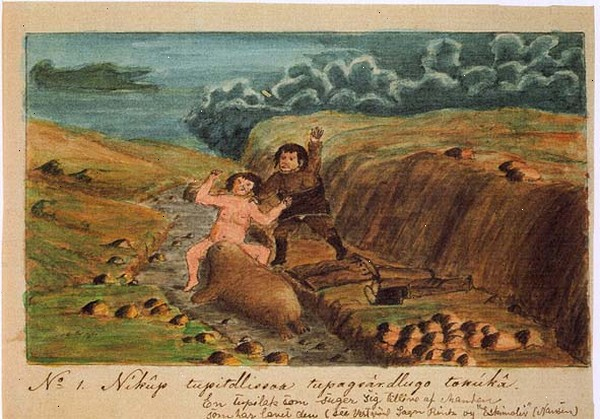
- Tupilak, woman and man, watercolour by Aron of Kangeq
- Born: 9 April 1822; Kangeq, Greenland
- Died: 12 March 1869 (aged 46)
- Occupations: Hunter, painter, storyteller
- Known for: Watercolours and woodcuts depicting Inuit traditions and Greenlandic life
- Notable work: Tupilak, woman and man
- Movement: Early Greenlandic art

Aron of Kangeq (Greenlandic: Aalut Kangermiu) (born in Kangeq, South Greenland on April 9, 1822; died March 12, 1869) was a Greenlandic Inuk hunter, painter, and oral historian. His woodcuts and watercolors are noted for their depiction of Inuit culture and history, and the often violent encounters between Inuit and Danish settlers. His storytelling is known to children's literature in Greenland.

== Art ==
Aron began drawing after he developed tuberculosis and was no longer able to work regularly as a hunter. In 1858, the Danish administrator Hinrich Johannes Rink invited Greenlanders to submit drawings, maps, and written accounts describing Greenlandic traditions and history. Rink recognized Aron's ability and supplied him with drawing materials so that he could continue his work.

Aron worked mainly in small watercolour paintings and woodcuts. Some of his woodcuts were used as illustrations in Rink's newspaper Atuagagdliutit, one of the earliest newspapers published in Greenland.

His drawings often show traditional Inuit stories, hunting scenes, and everyday life in nineteenth-century Greenland. Aron frequently added written captions to his images explaining what was happening in the scene or describing the story being told.

Although his work received little attention during his lifetime, it later gained wider recognition. In the twentieth century the archaeologist Eigil Knuth helped bring renewed attention to Aron's drawings and prints. Today, Aron is considered an important early figure in the development of Greenlandic art.
