= Mindebrønden =

Fountain in Qaqortoq, Greenland

Memorial Fountain
- Fountain
- {{{other_names}}}
- Mindebrønden
- Design: Pavia Høegh
- Constructed: 1929–1932
- Surface: Sandstone
- Location: Qaqortoq, Greenland
- Interactive map of Memorial Fountain
- Coordinates: 60°43′05″N 46°02′19″W

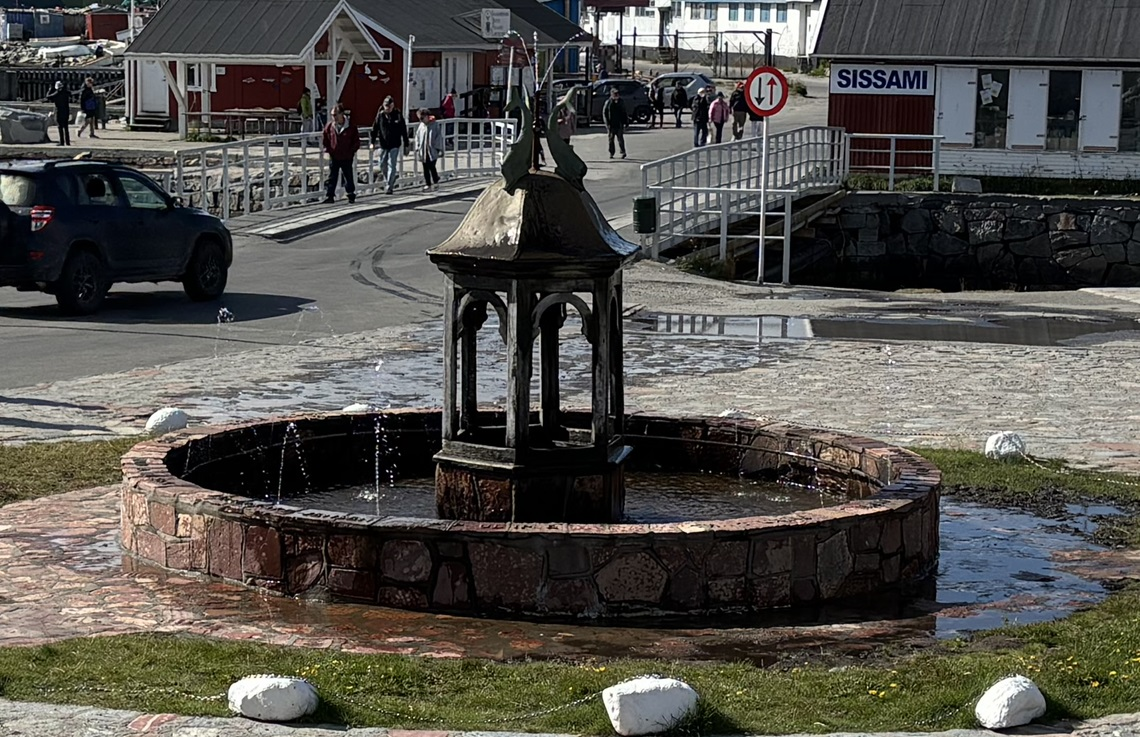
Fountain

Mindebrønden (Memorial Fountain) is a fountain in stone and bronze, located in the small Greenlandic town of Qaqortoq, formerly Julianehåb, in southern Greenland. It is the older one of the only two public fountains in Greenland.

== Construction ==
Mindebrønden is located in the middle of the small town square of Qaqortoq, and is one of the most well-known tourist sights in the city.

Construction of the fountain began in 1929 by architect Pavia Høegh (1886-1956), the grandfather of artist Aka Høegh. The fountain was finally completed in 1932, and it is the first and by far the oldest fountain in Greenland. The only other public fountain in Greenland can be found in Sisimiut.

The base of the fountain is carved from Igaliku sandstone, which is visually characteristic and easily recognizable. The distinctive stones were transported to Qaqortoq from the nearby Igaliku settlement.

The hexagonal structure in the center of the fountain has its origin in the "Anders Olsens minde" hexagonal gazebo, which stood beside Lake Storsøen, which lies just behind the town.

The fountain was protected in 1998 by the Greenlandic home rule. The fountain is turned off during the winter months.

== Theme ==
The theme of the fountain is referencing the whaling tradition, and three bronze whale sculptures are spouting water from their blowholes at the top of the structure. The round stone basin has a circle of spouts directed towards the fountain's center pillar, showering the center with small water jets.
