= Kalaallisut =

Kalaallisut may refer to:

- Greenlandic language
- West Greenlandic
