= Bergen Greenland Company =

Danish-Norwegian colonial company (1721–1727)

The Bergen Greenland Company (Danish: Det Bergen Grønlandske Compagnie) or Bergen Company (Bergenkompagniet) was a Dano-Norwegian private corporation charged with founding and administering Danish-Norwegian colonies and trade in Greenland, as well as searching for any survivors from the former Norse settlements on the island. It operated from 1721 until its bankruptcy in 1727. Although the Bergen Company failed as a concern and both its settlements were destroyed and abandoned, it was ultimately successful in re-establishing sovereignty over Greenland.

== History ==
The Norwegian Lutheran minister Hans Egede established the company with $9,000 in capital from the Bergen merchants, $200 from the Danish-Norwegian king Frederick IV, and a $300 annual grant from the Royal Mission College. The merchants hoped to find easily accessible mineral wealth or at least a Norwegian-like environment for agricultural production. Aid from the Mission College was aimed at spreading the Reformation among the long-lost Norsemen, who were presumed to still be Catholic or to have lapsed from Christianity altogether. The company was granted broad powers to govern the peninsula (as it was then considered to be), to raise its own army and navy, to collect taxes, and to administer justice; the king and his council, however, refused to grant it monopoly rights to whaling and trade in Greenland out of a fear of antagonizing the Dutch.

Departing Bergen on 2 May 1721, Egede led the Haabet and two other boats to Baal's River (the modern Nuup Kangerlua) and, on 3 July, established Hope Colony (Haabets Colonie) on the Island of Hope (Haabet Oe, modern Kangeq) with his family and a few dozen colonists. His settlers were devastated by scurvy and most of the colonists returned home as quickly as they could; only Egede, his family, and a few others remained to welcome two supply ships in 1722.

Egede's (now ship-borne) explorations found no Norse survivors along the western shore and future work was hampered by the two mistaken beliefs – both prevalent at the time – that the Eastern Settlement would be located on Greenland's east coast (it was later established it had been among the fjords of the island's extreme southwest) and that a strait existed nearby communicating with the western half of the island. In fact, his 1723 expedition found the churches and ruins of the Eastern Settlement, but he considered them to be those of the Western. At the end of the year, having found no Norse survivors after months of searching, he turned north to establish a whaling station on Nipisat Island and begin a mission among the Inuit. The whaling station was quickly burnt by the Dutch, whose better quality and lower-priced goods made the Bergen Company's trading operations impossible. The mission proved more successful and in 1724 Egede baptized his first child converts.

The Bergen Company went bankrupt in 1727. King Frederick attempted to replace it with a royal colony by sending Major Claus Paarss and several dozen soldiers and convicts to erect a fortress for the colony in 1728, but this new settlement of Good Hope (Godthaab) also failed due to scurvy and the group was recalled in 1730. Subsequent corporate-led administrations of Greenland learned from the Bergen Company's failure and received both trading monopolies over the island and enough naval support to generally maintain them.

== See also ==
- List of trading companies
