= Hans Egede =

Norwegian priest and missionary (1686–1758)

The Reverend Hans Egede
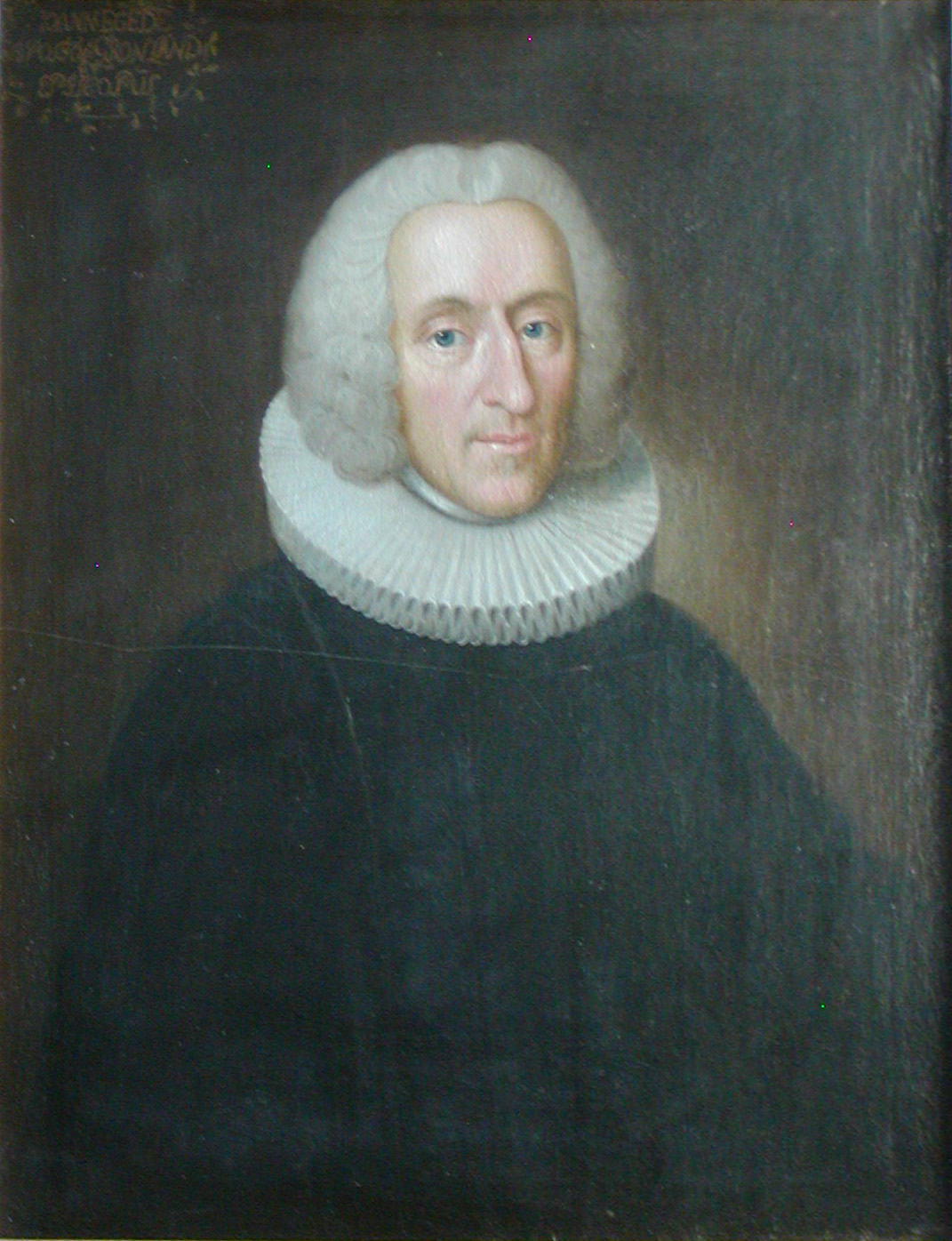
- Portrait by Johan Hörner, c. 1745
- Born: January 31, 1686; Harstad, Denmark–Norway (now Norway)
- Died: November 5, 1758 (aged 72); Falster, Denmark–Norway (now Denmark)
- Spouse: Gjertrud Nilsdatter Rasch
- Children: Paul Egede (1709–1789); Niels Egede (1710–1782); Kirstine Matthea Egede (1715–1786); Petronelle Egede (1716–1805)

Ecclesiastical career
- Church: Church of Norway (Evangelical Lutheran)
- Writings: Published the journal of his journey to Greenland
- Offices held: Ordained pastor; Missionary to Greenland; Bishop of Greenland; Principal of missionary seminary
- Title: National Saint of Greenland

Hans Poulsen Egede (31 January 1686 – 5 November 1758) was a Norwegian Lutheran priest who launched mission efforts to Greenland, which led him to be styled the Apostle of Greenland. He established a successful mission among the Inuit and is credited with revitalizing Danish-Norwegian interest in the island after contact had been broken for about 300 years. He founded Greenland's capital Godthåb, now known as Nuuk.

== Background ==
Hans Egede was born in Harstad, Norway, nearly 150 miles (240 km) north of the Arctic Circle. His mother was Kirsten Jensdatter Hind, daughter of a local merchant, and his father, Povel Hansen Egede, was a civil servant born to the priest of Vester Egede in southern Zealand, Denmark.

Egede was schooled by an uncle, a clergyman in a local Lutheran Church. In 1704 he travelled to Copenhagen to enter the University of Copenhagen, where he earned a bachelor's degree in theology. He returned to Hinnøya Island after graduation, and on 15 April 1707 he was ordained and assigned to a parish on the equally remote archipelago of Lofoten. That year he married Gertrud Rasch (or Rask). At the time he was about 21, while Rasch was 13 years his senior at 34. Four children were born to the marriage, two boys and two girls.

== Greenland ==
At Lofoten, Egede heard stories about the old Norse settlements on Greenland, with which contact had been lost centuries before. Beginning in 1711, he sought permission from Frederick IV of Denmark–Norway to search for the colony and establish a mission there, presuming that it had either remained Catholic after the Danish–Norwegian Reformation or been lost to the Christian faith altogether. Frederick gave consent at least partially to re-establish a colonial claim to the island.

Egede established the Bergen Greenland Company (Det Bergen Grønlandske Compagnie) with $9,000 in capital from Bergen merchants, $200 from Frederick IV of Denmark, and a $300 annual grant from the Royal Mission College.

The company was granted broad powers to govern Greenland, which was then believed to be a peninsula. It could raise its own army and navy, collect taxes, and administer justice. The king and his council, however, refused to grant the company monopoly rights to whaling and trade in Greenland, fearing this would antagonize the Dutch, who had an extensive whaling industry in the Arctic.

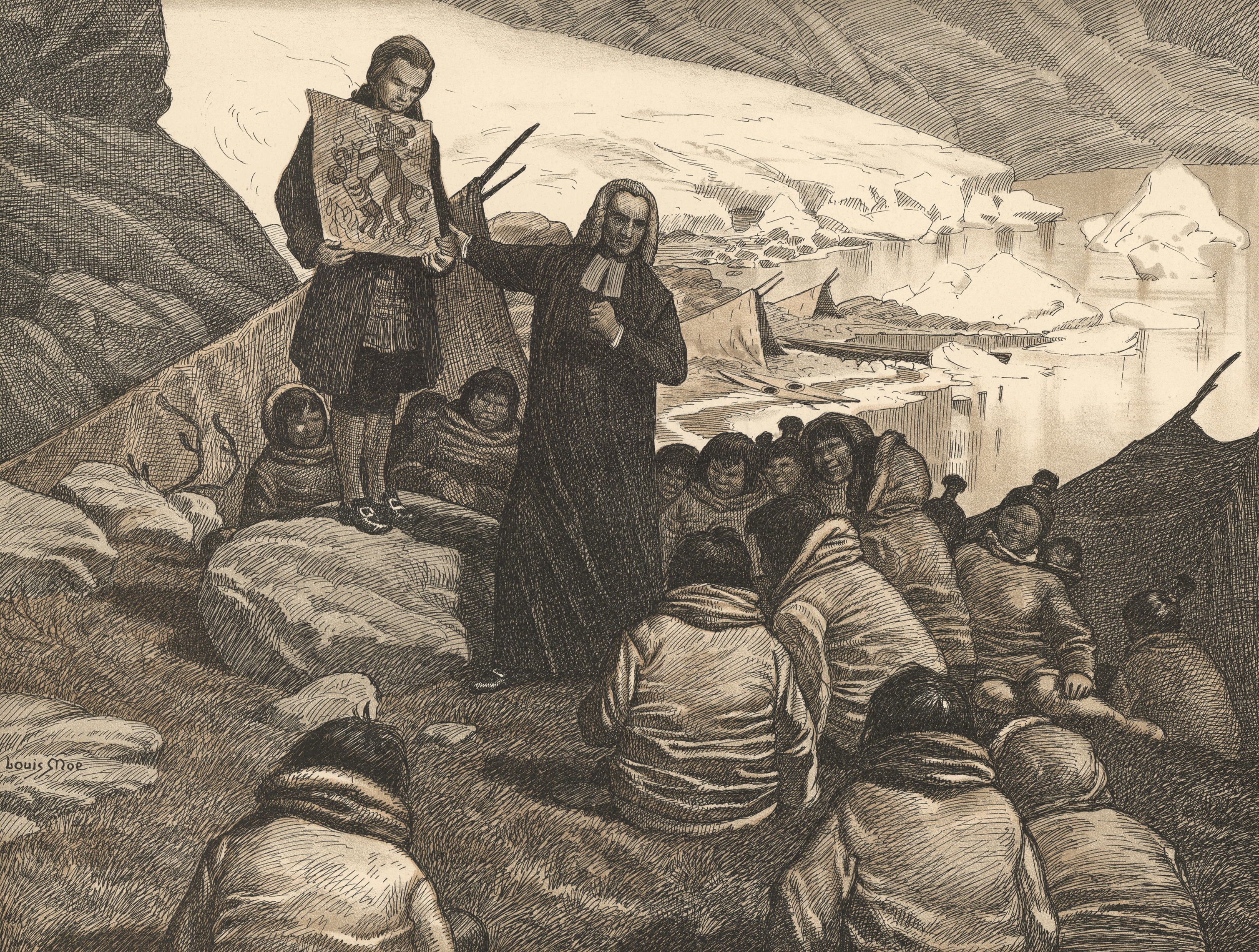
1898 lithograph of Egede evangelizing the Inuit

Haabet ("The Hope") and two smaller ships departed Bergen on 2 May 1721 bearing Egede, his wife and four children, and forty other colonists. On 3 July they reached Nuup Kangerlua and established Hope Colony (Haabets Colonie) with the erection of a portable house on Kangeq Island, which Egede christened the Island of Hope (Haabets Ø). Searching for months for descendants of the old Norse colonists, he found only the local Kalaallit people and began studying their language.

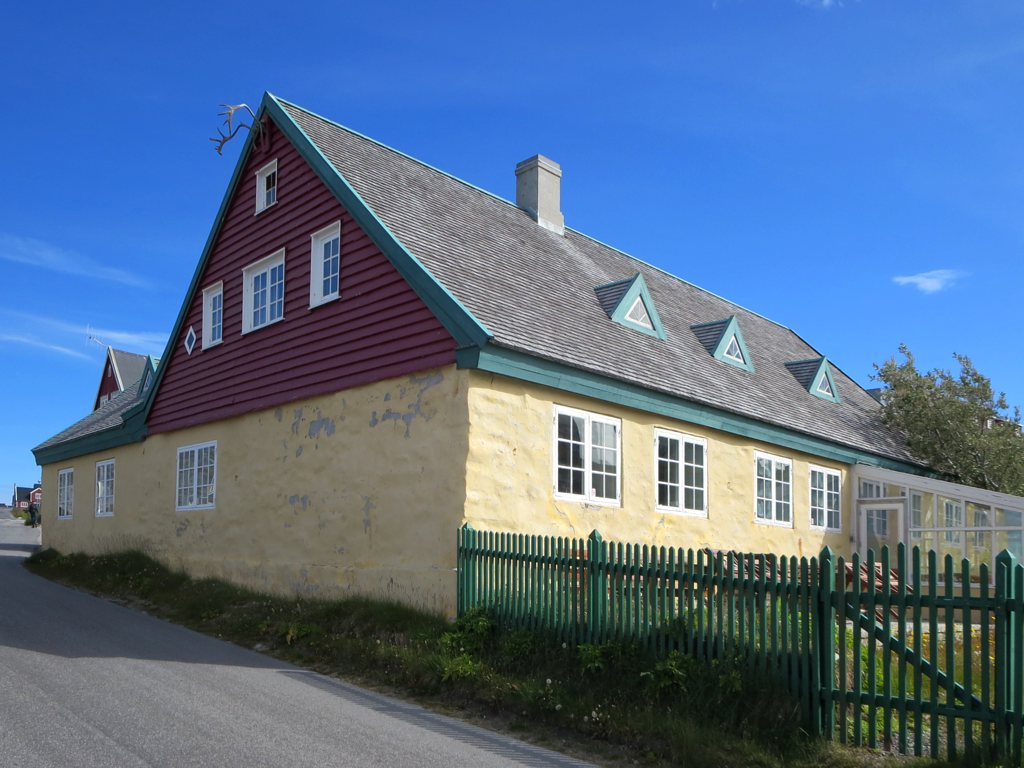
Egede's house in Nuuk, the oldest building in the city

By the end of the first winter, many of the colonists had been stricken with scurvy and most returned home as soon as they could. Egede and his family remained with a few others and in 1722 welcomed two supply ships the king had funded with the imposition of a new tax. His explorations, now carried out by ship, found no Norse survivors along Greenland's western shore. Like many Europeans of his time, however, Egede was guided by two mistaken assumptions. One was that the lost Eastern Settlement lay on Greenland's east coast, though it was later shown to have been located among the fjords of the island's far southwest. The other was the belief that a strait connected the eastern and western sides of the island. In fact, his 1723 expedition found the churches and ruins of the Eastern Settlement, but he considered them to be those of the Western. At the end of the year, he turned north and helped establish a whaling station on Nipisat Island. In 1724 he baptized his first child converts, two of whom would travel to Denmark and there inspire Count Zinzendorf to begin the Moravian missions.

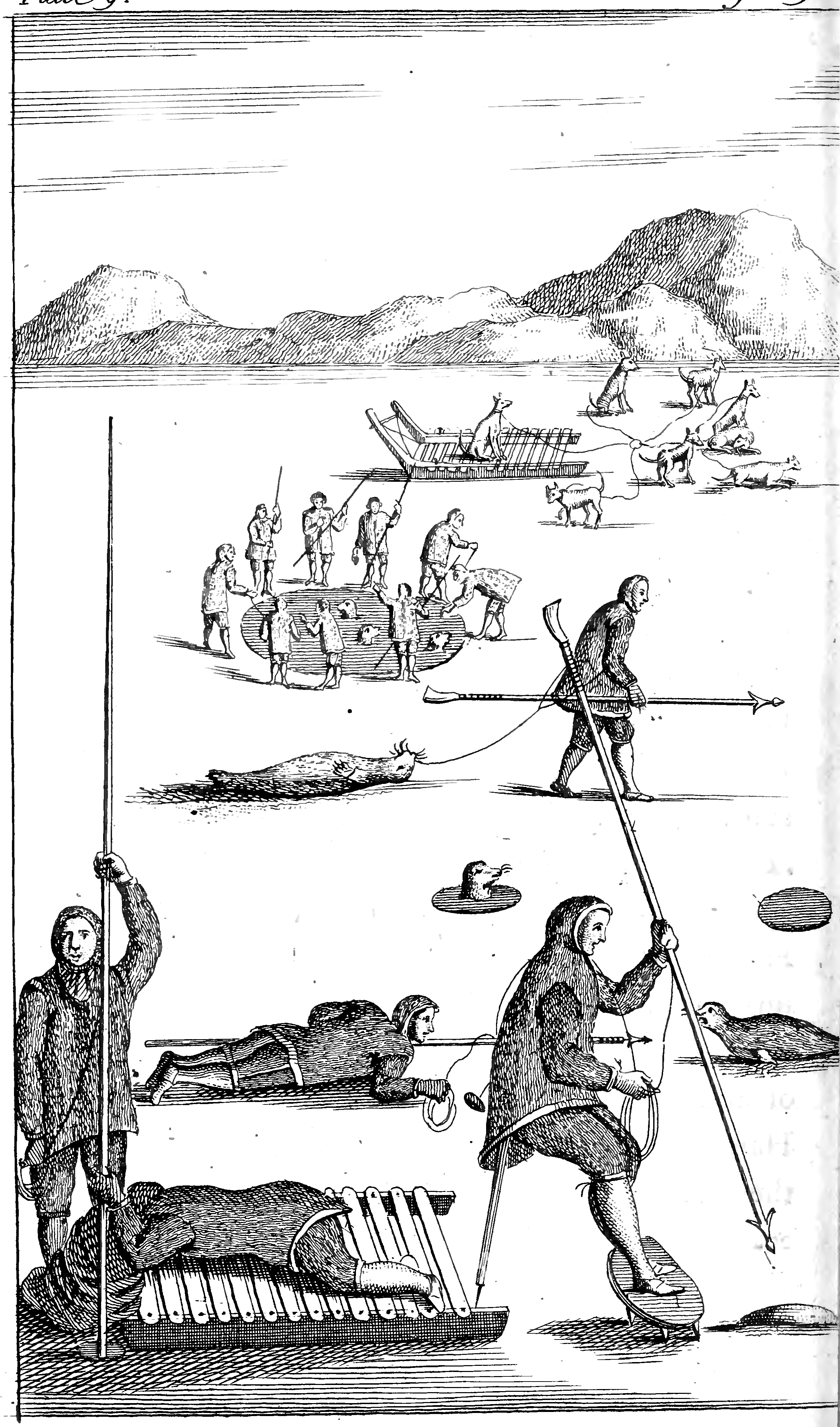
Illustration of Greenland Inuit seal hunters in the book "A Description of Greenland" by Egede, published in 1745.

In 1728, a royal expedition under Major Claus Paarss arrived with four supply ships and moved the Kangeq colony to the mainland opposite, establishing a fort named Godt-Haab ("Good Hope"), the future Godthåb. The extra supplies also allowed Egede to build a proper chapel within the main house. More scurvy led to forty deaths and abandonment of the site not only by the Danes but by the Inuit as well. Egede's book The Old Greenland's New Perlustration (Norwegian: Det gamle Grønlands nye Perlustration) appeared in 1729 and was translated into several languages, but King Frederick had lost patience and recalled Paarss's military garrison from Greenland the next year. Egede, encouraged by his wife Gertrud, remained with his family and ten sailors.

A supply ship in 1733 brought three missionaries and news that the king had granted 2,000 rixdollars a year to establish a new company for the colony under Jacob Severin. The Moravians, led by Christian David, established a station at Neu-Herrnhut. It later became the nucleus of modern Nuuk, Greenland's capital, and the Moravians went on to establish a string of missions along the island's west coast. The ship also returned one of Egede's convert children with a case of smallpox. By the next year, the epidemic was raging among the Inuit and in 1735 it claimed Gertrud Egede. Egede carried her body back to Denmark for burial the next year, leaving his son Poul to carry on his work. In Copenhagen, he was named Superintendent of the Greenland Mission Seminary (Seminarium Groenlandicum) and in 1741 the Lutheran Bishop of Greenland. He died on 5 November 1758 at the age of 72 in Stubbekøbing at Falster, Denmark.

== Language studies ==
Egede began his language studies soon after arriving in Greenland in 1721. Searching for months for descendants of the old Norse colonists, he found only the local Kalaallit people and began learning their language.

A commonly repeated story concerns his early attempts to translate the phrase "Give us this day our daily bread" from the Lord's Prayer. Because bread was not part of the traditional Inuit diet, the phrase has sometimes been reported as "Give us this day our daily seal". Egede first tried the word "mamaq", believing it meant "food", but the word actually means "how delicious!". This attempt dates from 1724, about three years after his arrival in Greenland. He later adopted the word "neqissat", meaning "food".

In 1725 Egede also recorded the word "timiusaq" as a way of describing bread. Nearly two decades later, when his son Poul Egede published the four Gospels in Greenlandic in 1744, he used this term. Earlier dictionaries indicate that the related word "timia" referred to bone marrow or the porous inner part of a leg bone or horn, and in this sense "timiusaq" originally meant something resembling bone marrow. In later ecclesiastical usage the word came to mean "wafer", and in northern Greenland it was also used for ship's biscuit.

A catechism for use in Greenland was completed by 1747, more than twenty-five years after Egede first arrived in Greenland.

== Legacy ==
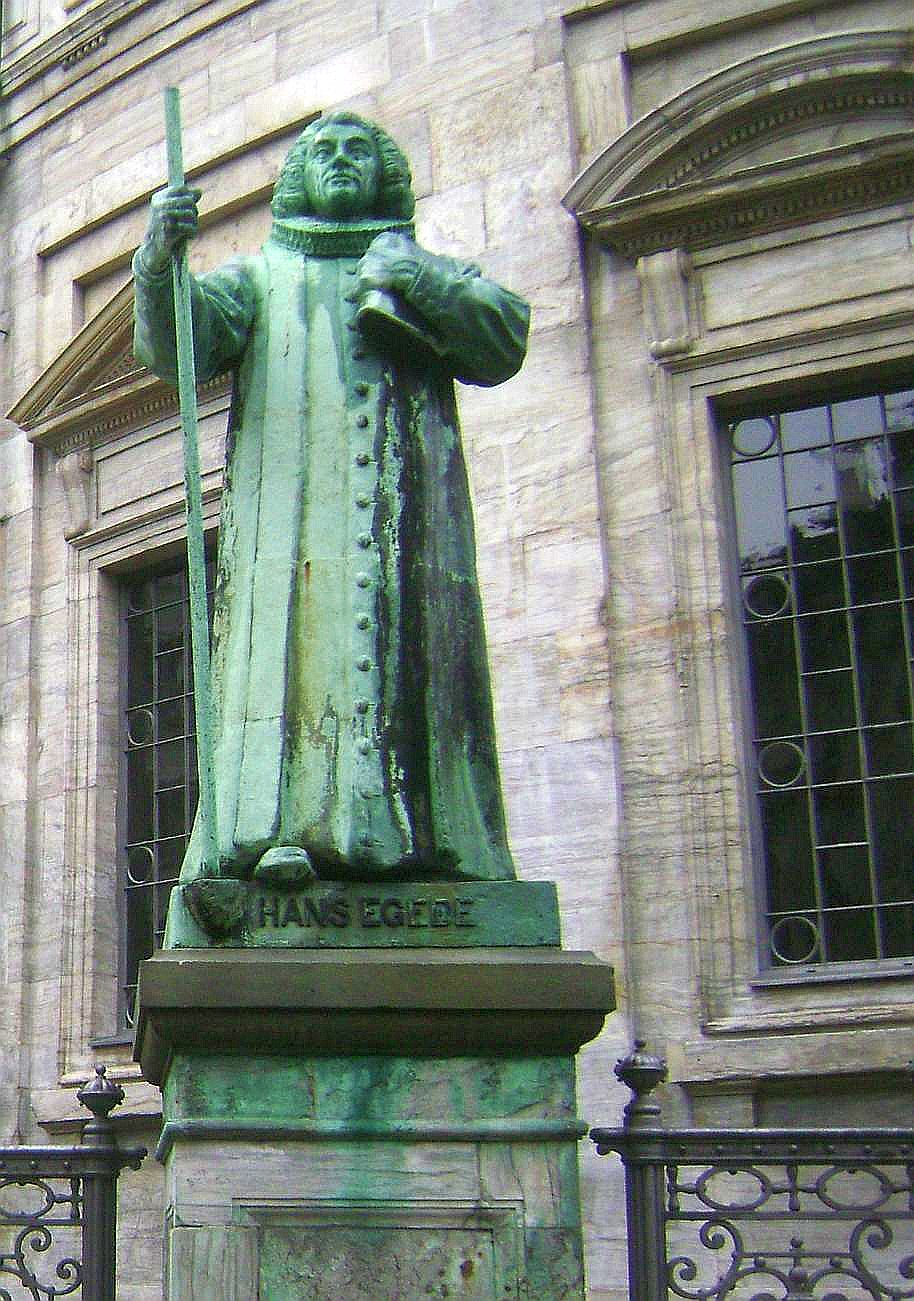
Statue of Hans Egede by August Saabye, outside Frederik's Church (Marmorkirken) in Copenhagen

Egede holds the legacy of a national "saint" of Greenland. The town of Egedesminde (lit. "Memory of Egede") commemorates him. It was established by Egede's second son, Niels, in 1759 on the Eqalussuit peninsula. It was moved to the island of Aasiaat in 1763, which had been the site of a pre-Viking Inuit settlement. His grandson and namesake Hans Egede Saabye also became a missionary to Greenland and published a celebrated diary of his time there.

The Royal Danish Geographical Society established the Egede Medal in his honour in 1916. The medal is in silver and awarded 'preferably for geographical studies and researches in the Arctic countries'.

A crater on the Moon is named after him: the Egede crater on the south edge of the Mare Frigoris (the Sea of Cold). The historical fiction novel "The Prophets of Eternal Fjord" narrates a tale of a missionary priest under Egede's instruction embarking upon Greenland to convert its indigenous peoples to Christianity.

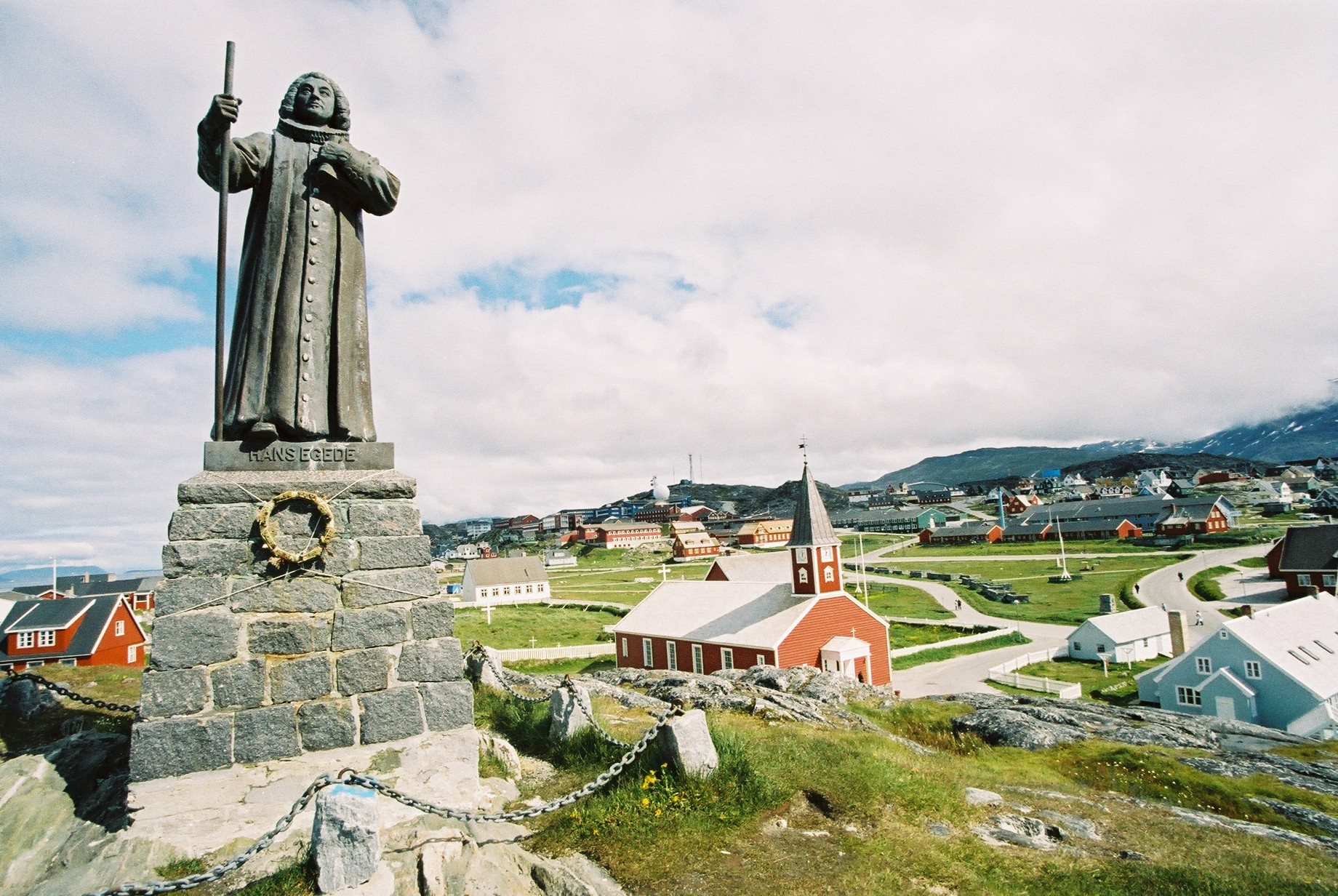
The statue of Hans Egede in Nuuk

Statues of Egede stand watch over Greenland's capital in Nuuk, outside of Vågan Church (Lofotkatedralen) in Kabelvåg and outside of Frederik's Church (Marmorkirken) in Copenhagen. Egede's statue at Frederick's Church in Copenhagen was vandalized with the word "decolonize" spray-painted on its base on June 20, 2020, during worldwide protests against memorials of colonial figures. The Egede statue in Nuuk, Greenland, was likewise vandalized ten days later. In a subsequent vote, 921 voted to keep the statue while 600 wanted it removed.

Egede gave one of the oldest descriptions of a sea serpent, now believed to have been a giant squid. On 6 July 1734 he wrote that his ship was off the Greenland coast when those on board "saw a most terrible creature, resembling nothing they saw before. The monster lifted its head so high that it seemed to be higher than the crow's nest on the mainmast. The head was small and the body short and wrinkled. The unknown creature was using giant fins which propelled it through the water. Later the sailors saw its tail as well. The monster was longer than our whole ship".

== Gallery ==
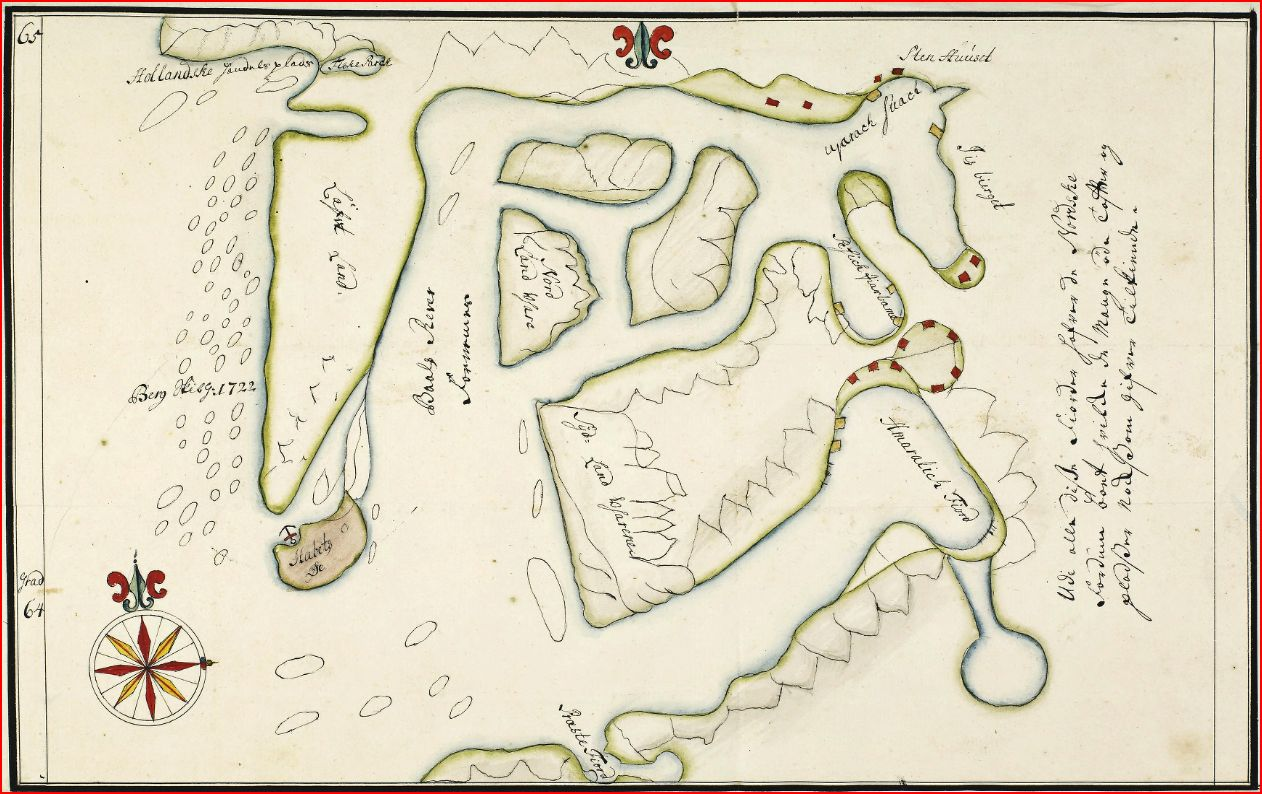
Egede's own 1722 map of the area around "Habets Oe"

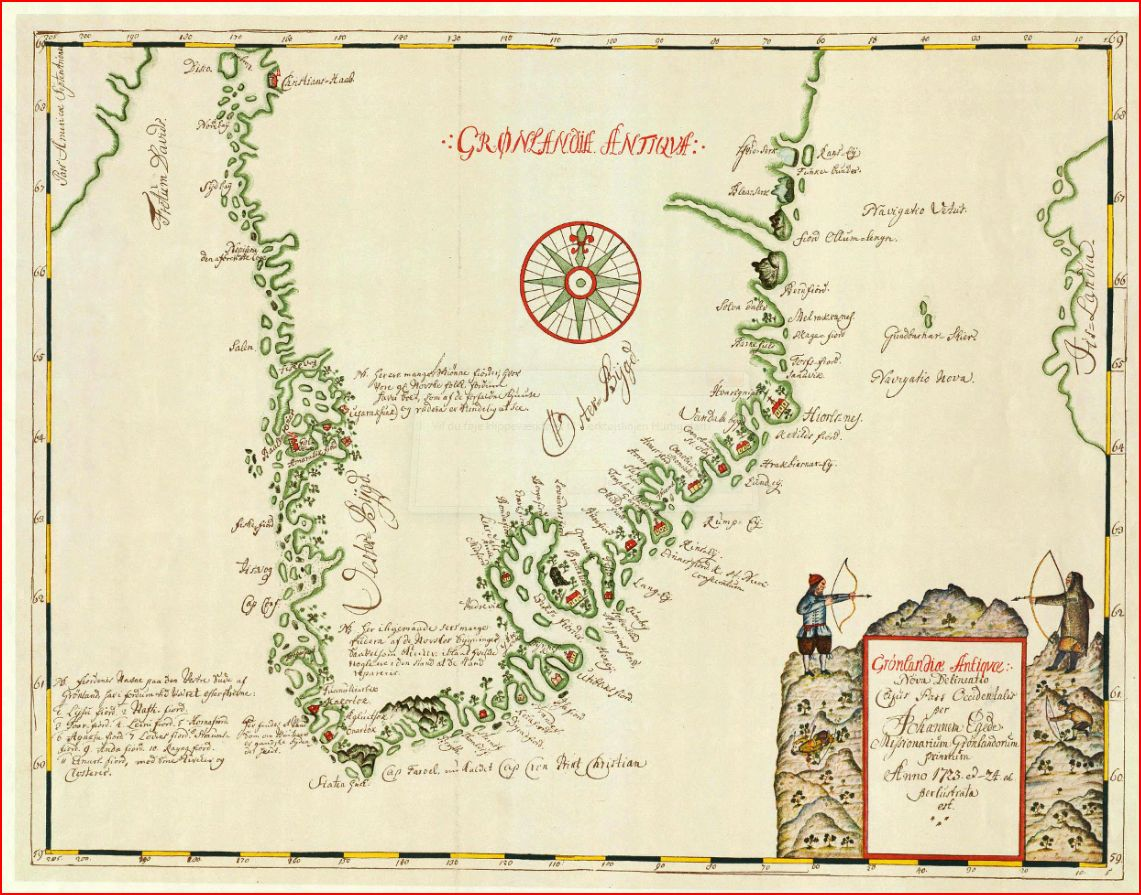
Egede's own 1723 map of Greenland

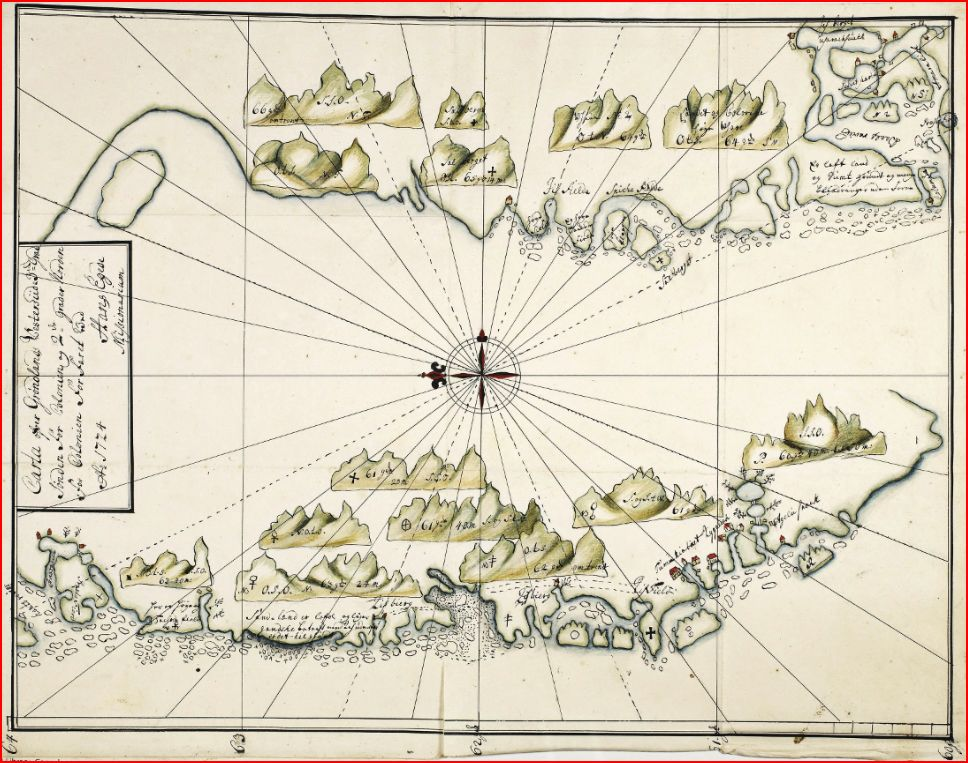
Egede's own 1724 map of western Greenland

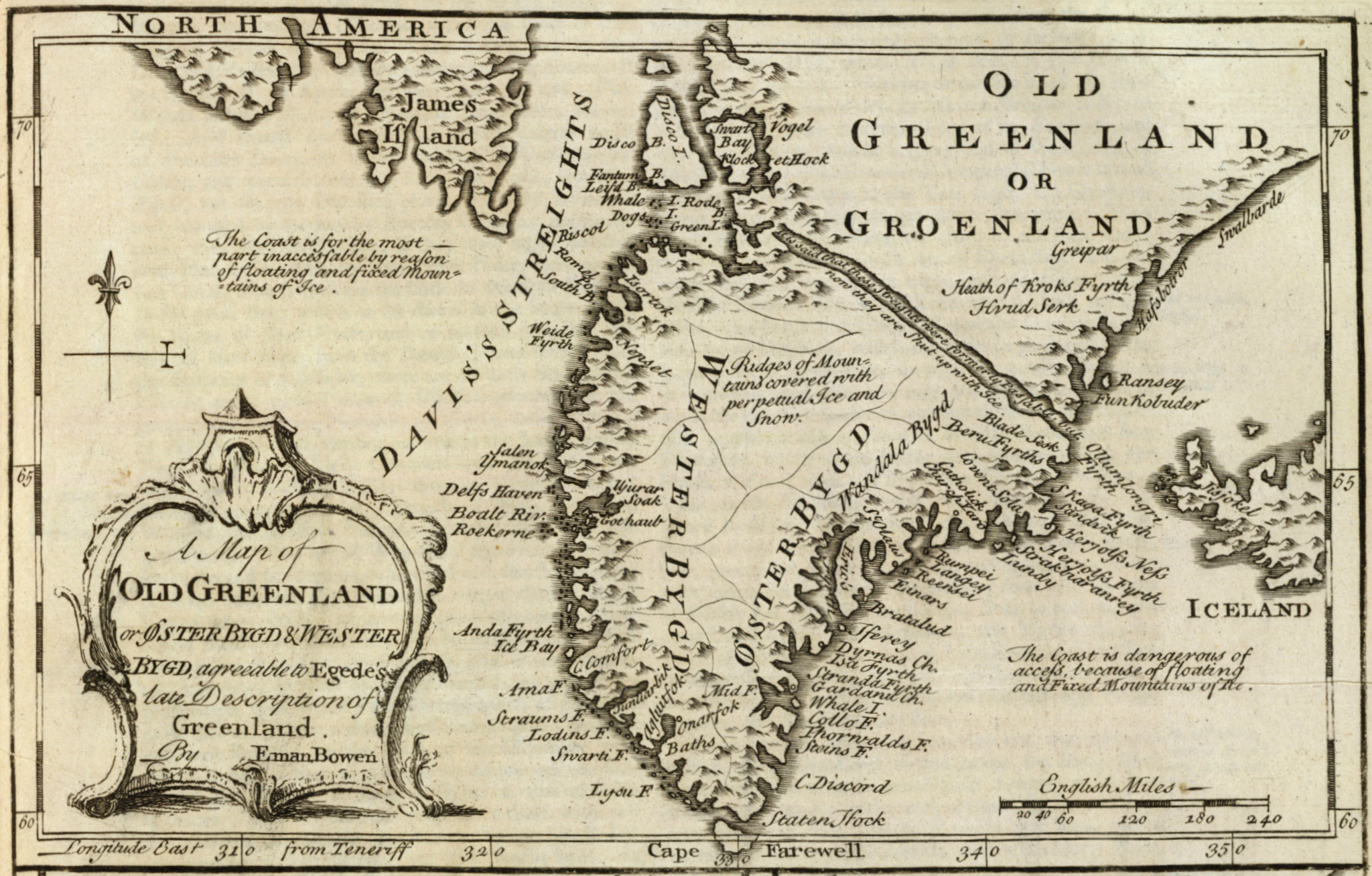
1747 map based on Egede's descriptions, by Emanuel Bowen

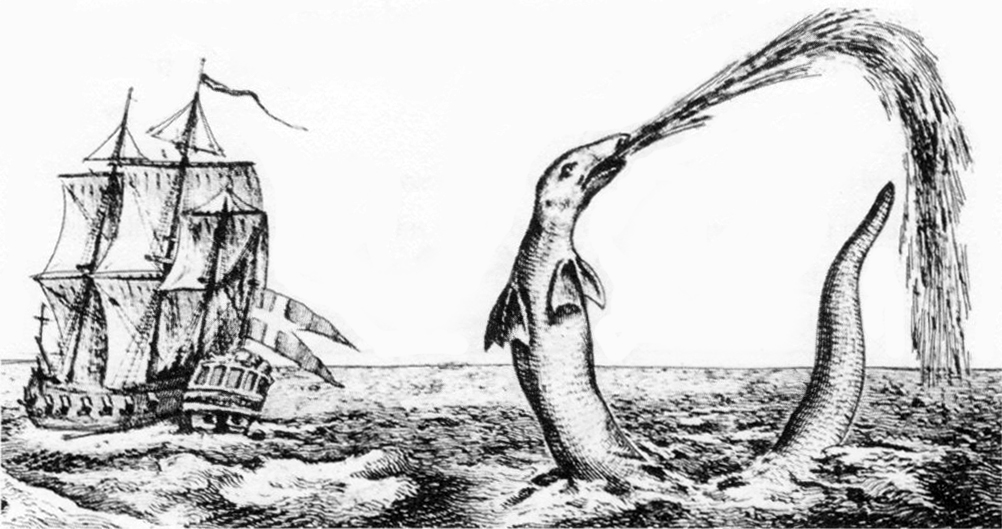
Sea serpent reported by Hans Egede in 1734, probably a giant squid

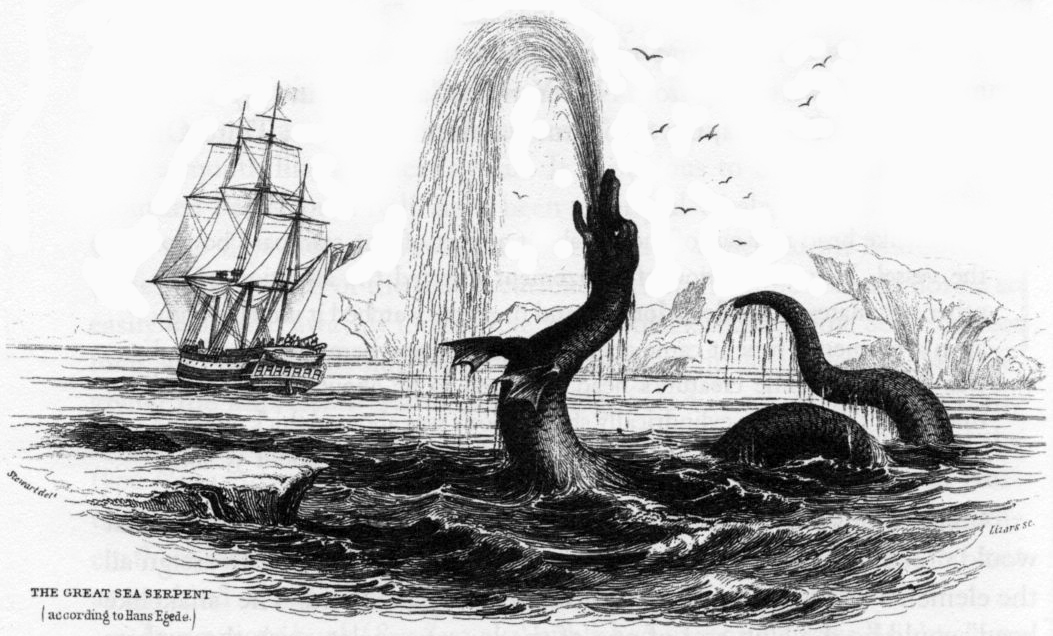
"Great Sea Serpent" according to Hans Egede

== Sources ==
- Bobé, Louis Hans Egede: Colonizer and Missionary of Greenland (Copenhagen: Rosenkilde and Bagger, 1952)
- Ingstad, Helge. Land under the pole star: a voyage to the Norse settlements of Greenland and the saga of the people that vanished (translated by Naomi Walford, Jonathan Cape, London: 1982)
- Garnett, Eve To Greenland's icy mountains; the story of Hans Egede, explorer, coloniser missionary (London: Heinemann. 1968)
- Barüske, Heinz Hans Egede und die Kolonisation Grönlands (Zeitschrift für Kulturaustausch, vol. 22 (1972) Nr.1)
- Chisholm, Hugh, ed. (1911). "Egede, Hans" . Encyclopædia Britannica. Vol. 9 (11th ed.). Cambridge University Press.
