= Claus Paarss =

Governor of Greenland from 1728 to 1730

Major Claus Enevold Paarss (18 February 1683 – 26 May 1762) was a Danish military officer and official. Retired from service, he was appointed governor of Greenland by King Frederick IV between 1728 and 1730.

Paarss was born in Thy in then Denmark–Norway in 1683 and commanded a Danish man-of-war and three or four other ships to Hans Egede's "Haabets Koloni" on Kangeq, which he removed to the mainland opposite and fortified under the name "Godt-Haab", later known as Godthåb and then Nuuk. His contingent of colonists consisted of twenty soldiers, three sergeants, and two officers from the Danish artillery corps, along with twelve military convicts, ten unmarried mothers, and two female convicts who were to be wed to one another according to lots. He also carried a dozen horses.

After putting down a general mutiny, Paarss tried and failed twice to cross the island from the Ameralik Fjord in search of resources and a connection to the supposed location of the old Norse Eastern Settlement. He also proposed a scheme to populate Greenland with fallen Danish aristocrats and their households on the model of the French colonies in Canada. Meanwhile, forty of his colonists died of scurvy and other complaints, leading to the abandonment of the colony even by the native Greenlanders.

Paarss died in Korsør in 1762.

== See also ==
- Danish colonization of Greenland
- List of governors of Greenland
- Hans Egede, a Lutheran missionary active at Paarss's settlement
