= Kangeq =

Kangeq Håbets Ø
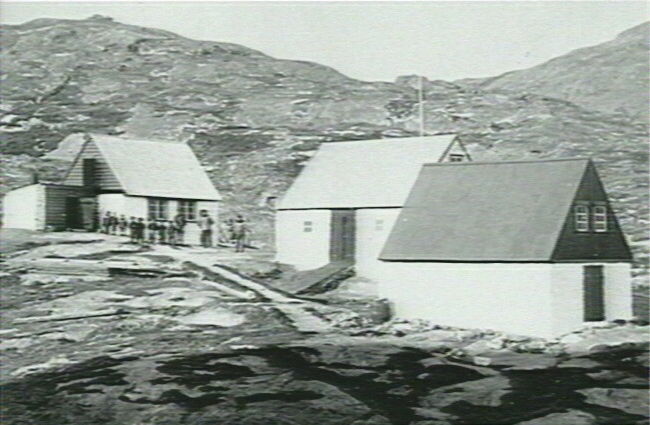
- Kangeq, ca. 1890

- Location within Greenland
- Coordinates: 64°07′00″N 52°04′00″W
- State: Kingdom of Denmark
- Constituent country: Greenland
- Municipality: Sermersooq
- First settled: before 1000 CE
- Abandoned: 1973
- Time zone: UTC-03

Kangeq or Kangek (Kalaallisut: "Promontory") is a former settlement in the Sermersooq municipality in southwestern Greenland. It is located on the same island that formed the first Danish-Norwegian colony on Greenland between 1721 and 1728.

== History ==
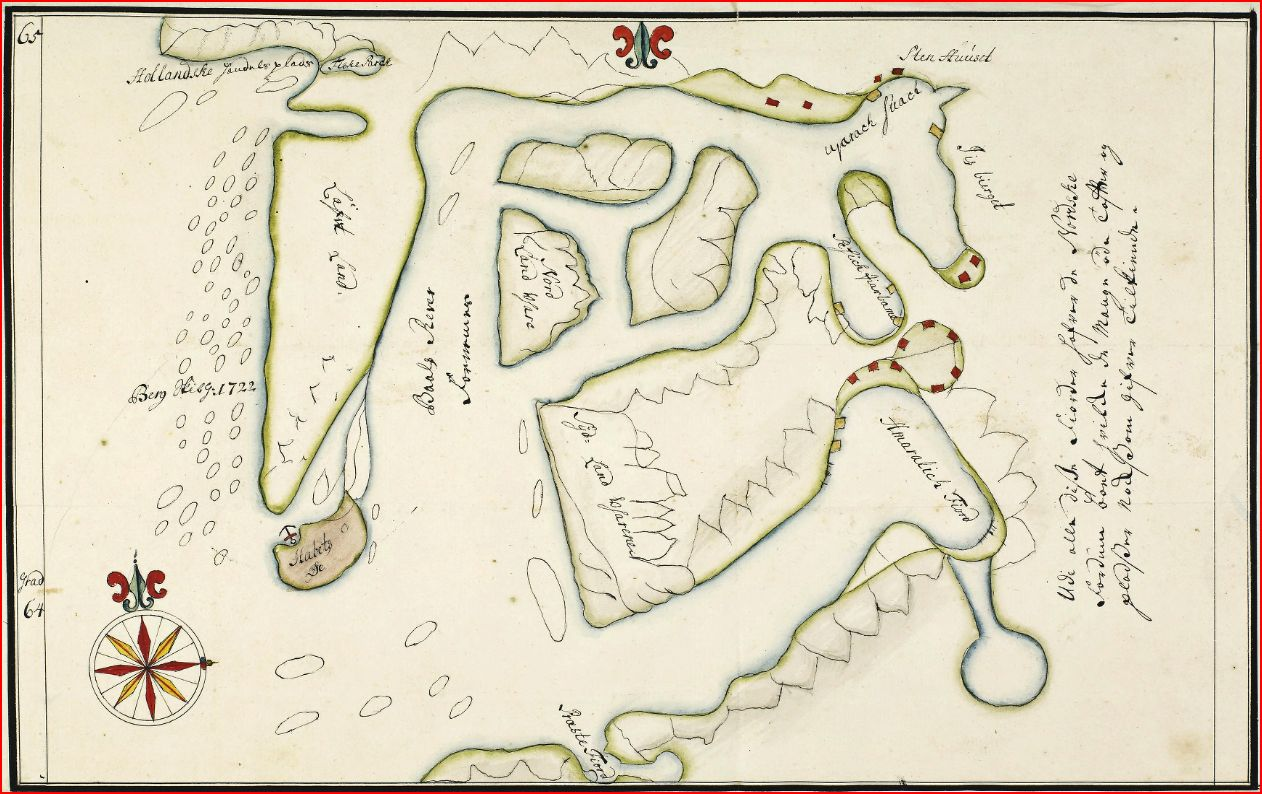
A map of Haabets Ø and Baal's River by Hans Egede.

As a coastal settlement, Kangeq was positioned along the migration route of the ancient Inuit peoples. Archeological finds from the Dorset culture era have been found near Kangeq. The Dorset people had vanished from the Nuuk region prior to 1000 CE.

The island of Kangeq, dubbed Håbets Ø ("Island of Hope"), formed the site of Hans Egede's first settlement in Greenland after his landing on 3 July 1721. The settlement was relocated to the mainland by Major Claus Paarss in 1728.

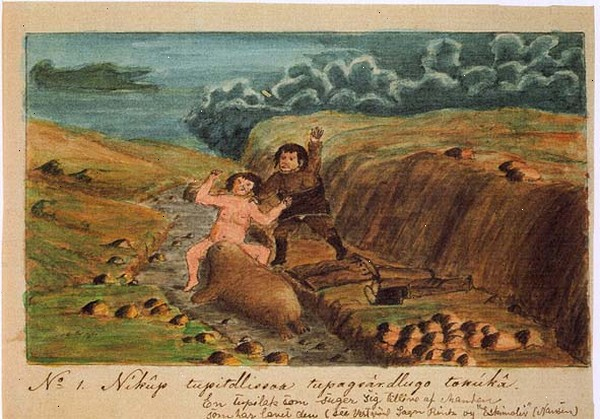
Tupilak, woman and man by Aron of Kangeq.

In the mid-19th century, it was also home to the artist Aron of Kangeq (1822–1869), a Greenlandic Inuk hunter, painter, and oral historian. In 1854, Kangeq became an official trading station, and an official residence was built for the assistant representing the Royal Greenland Trade Department.

Today the ruins of Kangeq are sometimes visited by historically oriented tourists. In 2009, the old houses of Kangeq were used as a backdrop for the Eksperimentet film, with the settlement emulating the look of Nuuk in 1952.

== Geography ==
Kangeq was located in an island at the mouth of the Nuup Kangerlua fjord, on the coast of the Labrador Sea, approximately 18 km (11 mi) west-south-west of Nuuk, the capital of Greenland.

== Former notable residents ==
- Aron of Kangeq (1822–1869), painter and oral historian
