= Eskimo =

Exonym for an Indigenous people of the circumpolar region

Total population
- 194,447

Regions with significant populations
- Russia: Chukotka Autonomous Okrug; Sakha (Yakutia); United States: Alaska; Canada: Newfoundland and Labrador; Northwest Territories; Nunavut; Quebec; Yukon (formerly); Greenland

Languages
- Inuit, Sirenik, and Yupik; Non-native European languages: English, Danish, French, and Russian

Religion
- Alaska Native religion, Inuit religion, Shamanism, Animism; Christianity (Russian Orthodox Church, Orthodox Church in America, Roman Catholicism, Anglican Church of Canada, Church of Denmark)

Related ethnic groups
- Aleut, Alaskan Creoles

Eskimo (/ˈɛskɪmoʊ/) is a controversial umbrella term and exonym that refers to two closely related Indigenous peoples, namely Inuit (including the Alaska Native Iñupiat, the Canadian and Greenlandic Inuit) and Yupik (or Yuit) of eastern Siberia and Alaska. A related third group, Aleuts, who inhabit the Aleutian Islands, are generally excluded from the definition of Eskimo. The three groups share a relatively recent common ancestor, and speak related languages belonging to the family of Eskaleut languages. These circumpolar peoples have traditionally inhabited the Arctic and subarctic regions from eastern Siberia (Russia) to Alaska (United States), Northern Canada, Nunavik, Nunatsiavut, and Greenland.

Some Inuit, Yupik, Aleut, and other individuals consider the term Eskimo, which is of a disputed etymology, to be pejorative or even offensive. Eskimo continues to be used within a historical, linguistic, archaeological, and cultural context. The governments in Canada and the United States have made moves to cease using the term Eskimo in official documents, but it has not been eliminated, as the word is in some places written into tribal, and therefore national, legal terminology. Canada officially uses the term Inuit to describe the indigenous Canadian people who are living in the country's northern sectors and who are not First Nations or Métis. The United States government legally uses Alaska Native for enrolled Yupik and Inuit tribal members, and also for non-Eskimos including Aleut, Tlingit, Haida, Eyak, and Tsimshian, in addition to at least nine northern Athabaskan/Dene peoples. Other non-enrolled individuals also claim Eskimo/Aleut descent, making it the world's "most widespread aboriginal group".

There are between 171,000 and 187,000 Inuit and Yupik, the majority of whom live in or near their traditional circumpolar homeland. Of these, 53,785 (2010) live in the United States, 70,545 (2021) in Canada, 51,730 (2021) in Greenland and 1,657 (2021) in Russia. In addition, 16,730 people living in Denmark were born in Greenland. The Inuit Circumpolar Council, a non-governmental organization (NGO), claims to represent 180,000 people.

In the Eskaleut language family, the Eskimo or Eskimoan branch has an Inuit language sub-branch, and a sub-branch of four Yupik languages. Two Yupik languages are used in the Russian Far East as well as on St. Lawrence Island, and two in western Alaska, southwestern Alaska, and western Southcentral Alaska. The extinct Sirenik language also belongs to the Eskimoan branch.

== Nomenclature ==
=== Etymology ===
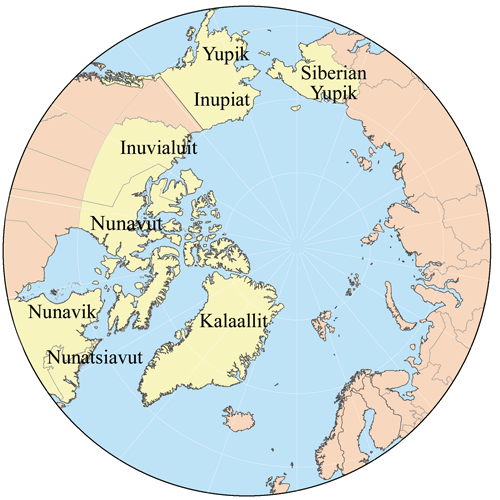
Map of the Inuit Circumpolar Council of Eskimo peoples, showing the Yupik (Yup'ik, Siberian Yupik) and Inuit (Iñupiat, Inuvialuit, Nunavut, Nunavik, Nunatsiavut, Greenlandic Inuit)

A variety of theories have been postulated for the etymological origin of the word Eskimo. According to Smithsonian linguist Ives Goddard, etymologically the word derives from the Innu-aimun (Montagnais) word ayas̆kimew, meaning 'a person who laces a snowshoe', and is related to husky (a breed of dog). The word assime·w means 'she laces a snowshoe' in Innu, and Innu language speakers refer to the neighbouring Mi'kmaq people using words that sound like eskimo. This interpretation is generally confirmed by more recent academic sources.

In 1978, José Mailhot, a Quebec anthropologist who speaks Innu-aimun (Montagnais), published a paper suggesting that Eskimo meant 'people who speak a different language'. French traders who encountered the Innu (Montagnais) in the eastern areas adopted their word for the more western peoples and spelled it as Esquimau or Esquimaux in a transliteration.

Some people consider Eskimo offensive, because it is popularly perceived to mean 'eaters of raw meat' in Algonquian languages common to people along the Atlantic coast. An unnamed Cree speaker suggested the original word that became corrupted to Eskimo might have been askamiciw (meaning 'he eats it raw'); Inuit are referred to in some Cree texts as askipiw (meaning 'eats something raw'). Regardless, the term still carries a derogatory connotation for many Inuit and Yupik.

One of the first printed uses of the French word Esquimaux comes from Samuel Hearne's A Journey from Prince of Wales's Fort in Hudson's Bay to the Northern Ocean in the Years 1769, 1770, 1771, 1772 first published in 1795.

=== Usage ===
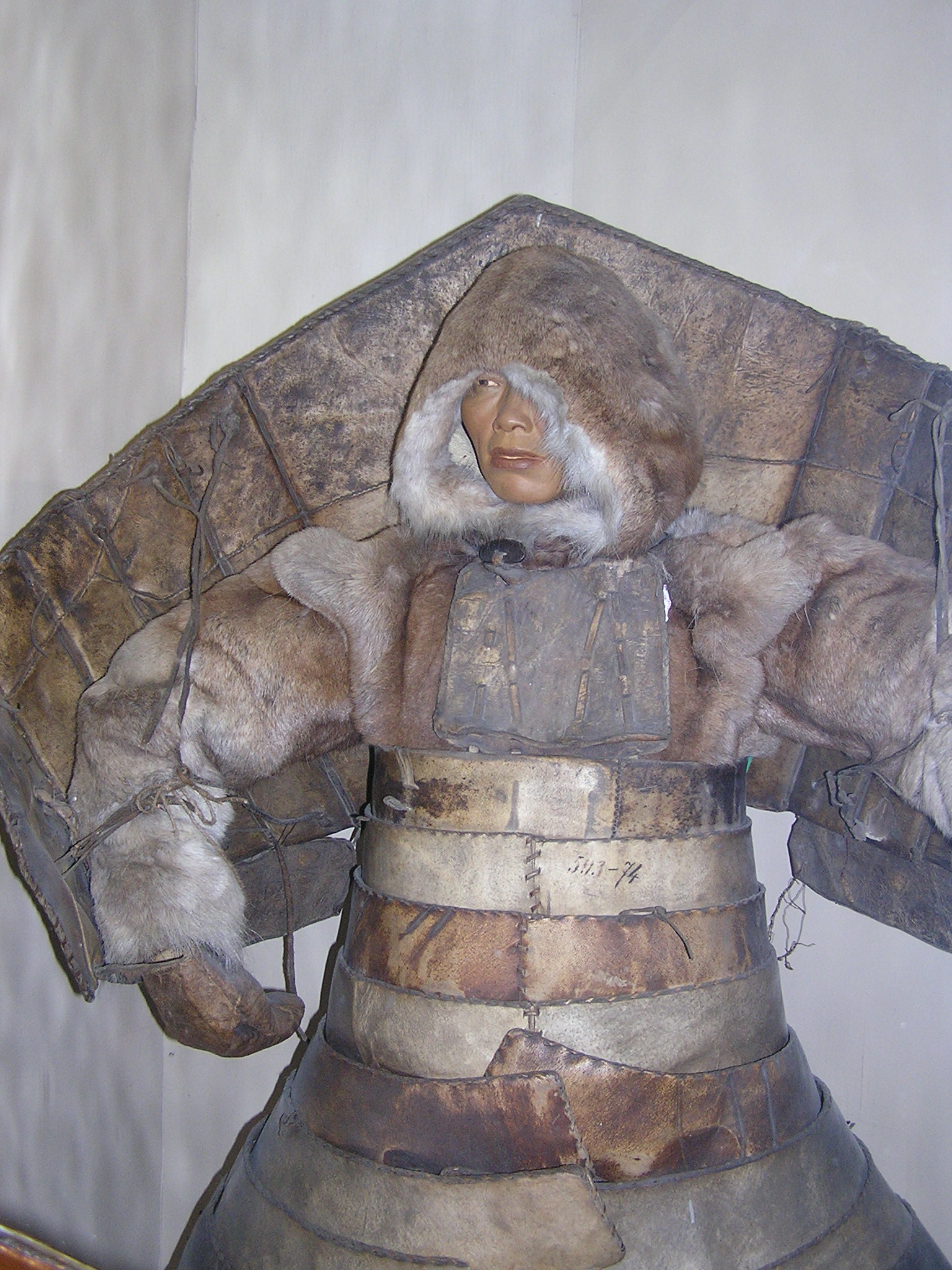
Laminar armour from hardened leather reinforced by wood and bones worn by native Siberians and Eskimos

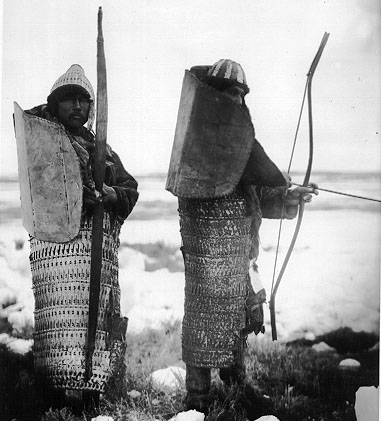
Lamellar armour worn by native Siberians

The term Eskimo is still used by people to encompass Inuit and Yupik, as well as other Indigenous or Alaska Native and Siberian peoples. In the 21st century, usage in North America has declined. Linguistic, ethnic, and cultural differences exist between Yupik and Inuit.

In Canada and Greenland, and to a certain extent in Alaska, the term Eskimo is predominantly seen as offensive and has been widely replaced by the term Inuit or terms specific to a particular group or community. This has resulted in a trend whereby some non-Indigenous people believe that they should use Inuit even for Yupik, who are non-Inuit.

Greenlandic Inuit generally refer to themselves as Greenlanders (Kalaallit or Grønlændere) and speak the Greenlandic language and Danish. Greenlandic Inuit belong to three groups: the Kalaallit of west Greenland, who speak Kalaallisut; the Tunumiit of Tunu (east Greenland), who speak Tunumiit oraasiat ("East Greenlandic"); and the Inughuit of north Greenland, who speak Inuktun.

The word Eskimo is a racially charged term in Canada. In Canada's Central Arctic, Inuinnaq is the preferred term, and in the eastern Canadian Arctic Inuit. The language is often called Inuktitut, though other local designations are also used.

Section 25 of the Canadian Charter of Rights and Freedoms and section 35 of the Constitution Act of 1982 recognized Inuit as a distinctive group of Aboriginal peoples in Canada. Although Inuit can be applied to all of the Eskimo peoples in Canada and Greenland, that is not true in Alaska and Siberia. In Alaska, the term Eskimo is still used because it includes both Iñupiat (singular: Iñupiaq), who are Inuit, and Yupik, who are not.

The term Alaska Native is inclusive of (and under U.S. and Alaskan law, as well as the linguistic and cultural legacy of Alaska, refers to) all Indigenous peoples of Alaska, including not only the Iñupiat (Alaskan Inuit) and the Yupik, but also groups such as the Aleut, who share a recent ancestor, as well as the largely unrelated indigenous peoples of the Pacific Northwest Coast and the Alaskan Athabaskans, such as the Eyak people. The term Alaska Native has important legal usage in Alaska and the rest of the United States as a result of the Alaska Native Claims Settlement Act of 1971. It does not apply to Inuit or Yupik originating outside the state. As a result, the term Eskimo is still in use in Alaska. Alternative terms, such as Inuit-Yupik, have been proposed, but none has gained widespread acceptance. Early 21st century population estimates registered more than 135,000 individuals of Eskimo descent, with approximately 85,000 living in North America, 50,000 in Greenland, and the rest residing in Siberia.

=== Inuit Circumpolar Council ===
Kinugumiut Eskimo woman photo from a 1912 publication.

Kinugumiut Eskimo man photo from a 1912 publication.

In 1977, the Inuit Circumpolar Conference (ICC) meeting in Utqiaġvik, Alaska (then, Barrow, Alaska), officially adopted Inuit as a designation for all circumpolar Native peoples, regardless of their local view on an appropriate term. They voted to replace the word Eskimo with Inuit. Even at that time, such a designation was not accepted by all. As a result, the Canadian government usage has replaced the term Eskimo with Inuit (Inuk in singular).

The ICC charter defines Inuit as including "the Inupiat, Yupik (Alaska), Inuit, Inuvialuit (Canada), Kalaallit (Greenland) and Yupik (Russia)". Despite the ICC's 1977 decision to adopt the term Inuit, this has not been accepted by all or even most Yupik people.

In 2010, the ICC passed a resolution in which they implored scientists to use Inuit and Paleo-Inuit instead of Eskimo or Paleo-Eskimo.

==== Academic response ====
In a 2015 commentary in the journal Arctic, Canadian archaeologist Max Friesen argued fellow Arctic archaeologists should follow the ICC and use Paleo-Inuit instead of Paleo-Eskimo. In 2016, Lisa Hodgetts and Arctic editor Patricia Wells wrote: "In the Canadian context, continued use of any term that incorporates Eskimo is potentially harmful to the relationships between archaeologists and the Inuit and Inuvialuit communities who are our hosts and increasingly our research partners."

Hodgetts and Wells suggested using more specific terms when possible (e.g., Dorset and Groswater) and agreed with Frieson in using the Inuit tradition to replace Neo-Eskimo, although they noted replacement for Palaeoeskimo was still an open question and discussed Paleo-Inuit, Arctic Small Tool Tradition, and pre-Inuit, as well as Inuktitut loanwords like Tuniit and Sivullirmiut, as possibilities.

In 2020, Katelyn Braymer-Hayes and colleagues argued in the Journal of Anthropological Archaeology that there is a "clear need" to replace the terms Neo-Eskimo and Paleo-Eskimo, citing the ICC resolution, but finding a consensus within the Alaskan context particularly is difficult, since Alaska Natives do not use the word Inuit to describe themselves nor is the term legally applicable only to Iñupiat and Yupik in Alaska, and as such, terms used in Canada like Paleo Inuit and Ancestral Inuit would not be acceptable.

American linguist Lenore Grenoble has also explicitly deferred to the ICC resolution and used Inuit–Yupik instead of Eskimo with regards to the language branch.

== History ==
Genetic evidence suggests that the Americas were populated from northeastern Asia in multiple waves. While the great majority of indigenous American peoples can be traced to a single early migration of Paleo-Indians, the Na-Dené, Inuit and Indigenous Alaskan populations exhibit admixture from distinct populations that migrated into America at a later date and are closely linked to the peoples of far northeastern Asia (e.g. Chukchi), and only more remotely to the majority indigenous American type. For modern Eskimo–Aleut speakers, this later ancestral component makes up almost half of their genomes. The ancient Paleo-Eskimo population was genetically distinct from the modern circumpolar populations, but eventually derives from the same far northeastern Asian cluster. It is understood that some or all of these ancient people migrated across the Chukchi Sea to North America during the pre-neolithic era, somewhere around 5,000 to 10,000 years ago. It is believed that ancestors of the Aleut people inhabited the Aleutian Chain 10,000 years ago.

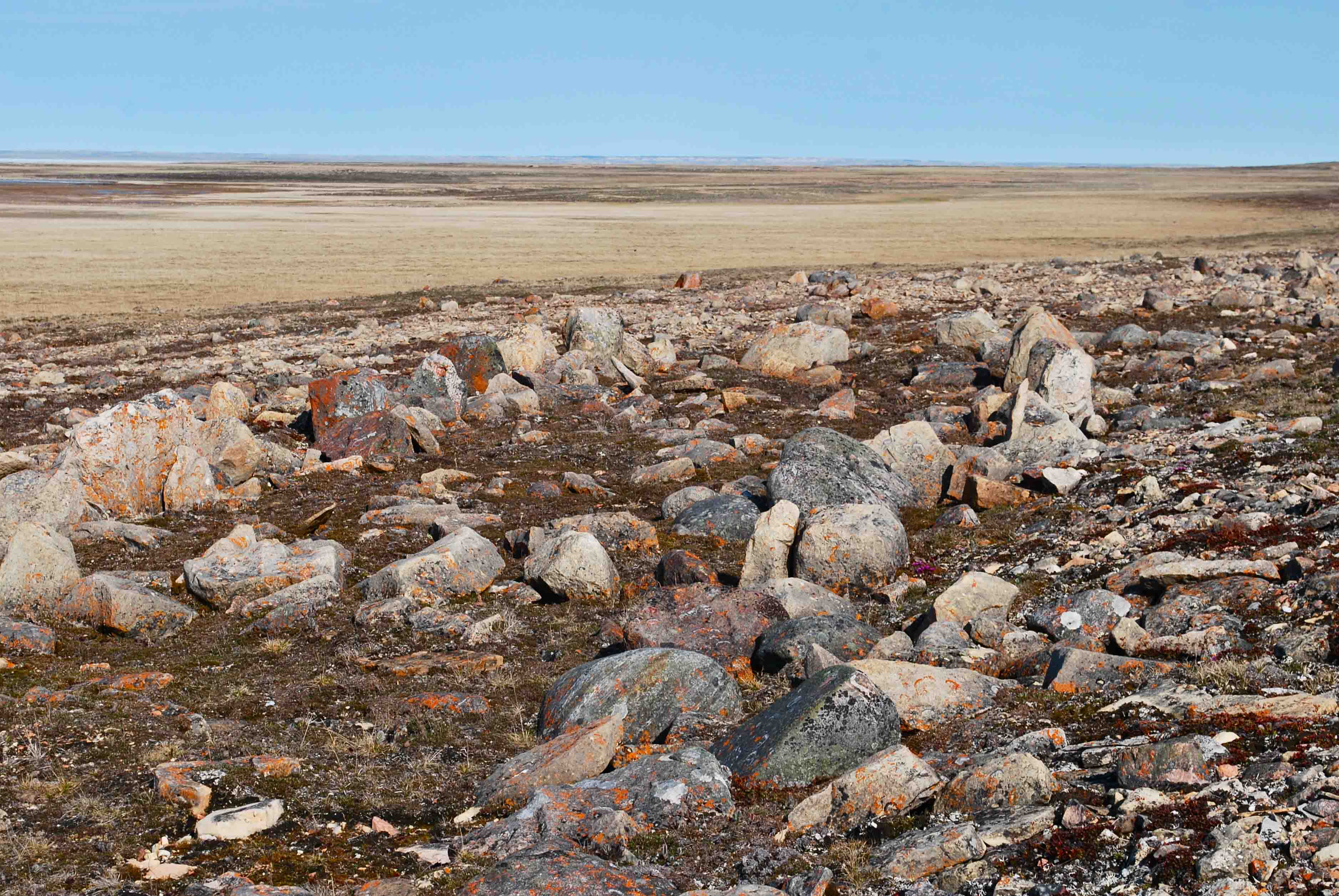
Stone remains of a Dorset culture longhouse near Cambridge Bay, Nunavut

The earliest positively identified Paleo-Eskimo cultures (Early Paleo-Eskimo) date to 5,000 years ago. Several earlier indigenous peoples existed in the northern circumpolar regions of eastern Siberia, Alaska, and Canada (although probably not in Greenland). The Paleo-Eskimo peoples appear to have developed in Alaska from people related to the Arctic small tool tradition in eastern Asia, whose ancestors had probably migrated to Alaska at least 3,000 to 5,000 years earlier.

The Yupik languages and cultures in Alaska evolved in place, beginning with the original pre-Dorset Indigenous culture developed in Alaska. At least 4,000 years ago, the Unangan culture of the Aleut became distinct. It is not generally considered an Eskimo culture. However, there is some possibility of an Aleutian origin of the Dorset people, who in turn are a likely ancestor of today's Inuit and Yupik.

Approximately 1,500 to 2,000 years ago, apparently in northwestern Alaska, two other distinct variations appeared. Inuit language became distinct and, over a period of several centuries, its speakers migrated across northern Alaska, through Canada, and into Greenland. The distinct culture of the Thule people (drawing strongly from the Birnirk culture) developed in northwestern Alaska. It very quickly spread over the entire area occupied by Eskimo peoples, though it was not necessarily adopted by all of them.

== Languages ==
=== Language family ===
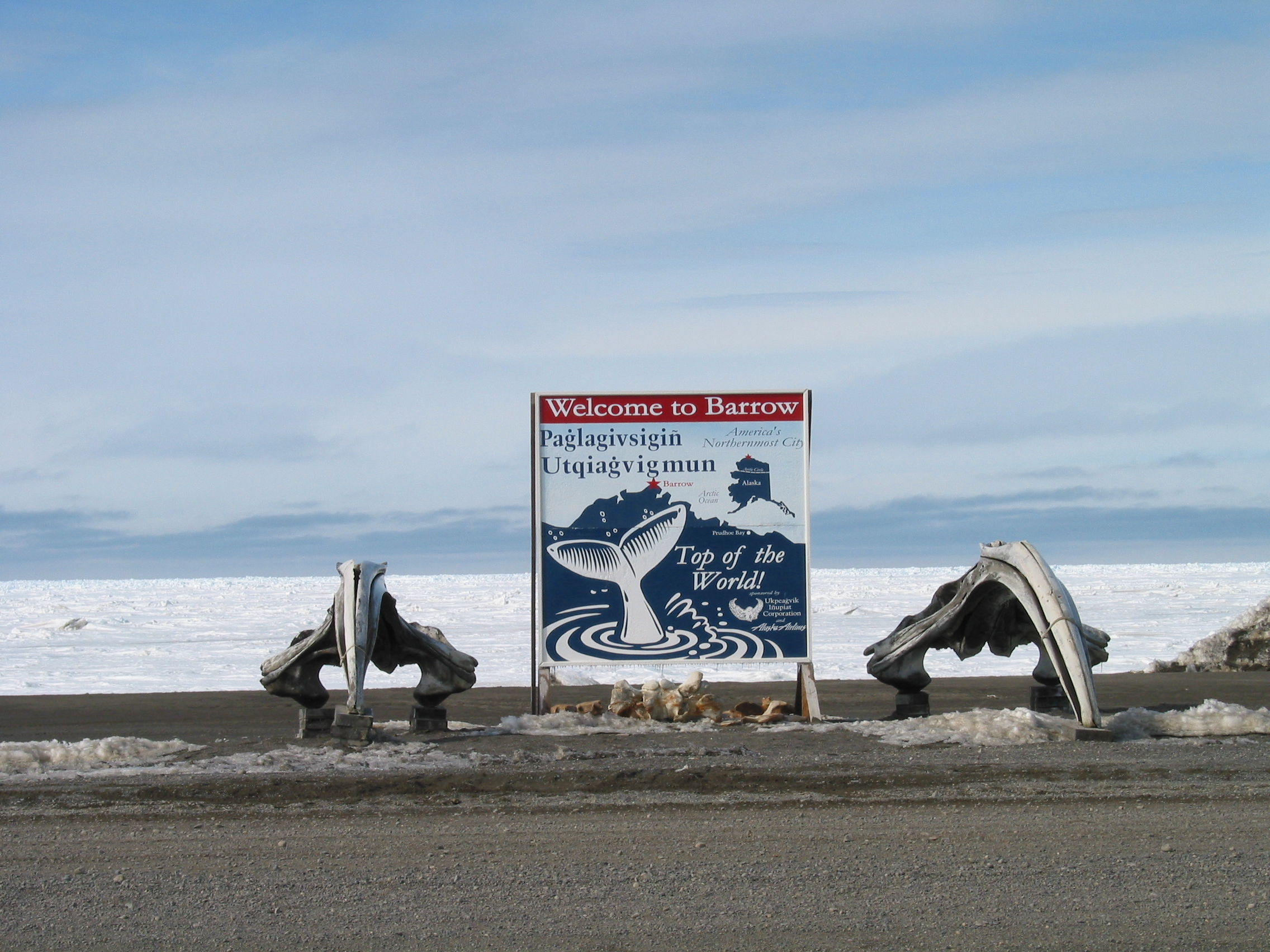
English ("Welcome to Barrow") and Iñupiaq (Paġlagivsigiñ Utqiaġvigmun), Utqiaġvik, Alaska, framed by whale jawbones

The Eskimo–Aleut (also known as Eskaleut or Inuit–Yupik–Unangan) family of languages includes two cognate branches: the Aleut (Unangan) branch and the Inuit–Yupik branch.

The number of cases varies, with Aleut languages having a greatly reduced case system compared to those of the Inuit–Yupik subfamily. Inuit–Yupik–Unangan languages possess voiceless plosives at the bilabial, coronal, velar and uvular positions in all languages except Aleut, which has lost the bilabial stops but retained the nasal. In the Inuit–Yupik subfamily a voiceless alveolar lateral fricative is also present.

The Inuit–Yupik sub-family consists of the Inuit and Yupik language sub-groups. The Sirenik language, which is virtually extinct, is sometimes regarded as a third branch of the Inuit–Yupik language family. Other sources regard it as a group belonging to the Yupik branch.

Inuit languages comprise a dialect continuum, or dialect chain, that stretches from Unalakleet and Norton Sound in Alaska, across northern Alaska and Canada, and east to Greenland. Changes from western (Iñupiaq) to eastern dialects are marked by the dropping of vestigial Yupik-related features, increasing consonant assimilation (e.g., kumlu, meaning "thumb", changes to kuvlu, changes to kublu, changes to kulluk, changes to kulluq,) and increased consonant lengthening, and lexical change. Thus, speakers of two adjacent Inuit dialects would usually be able to understand one another, but speakers from dialects distant from each other on the dialect continuum would have difficulty understanding one another. Seward Peninsula dialects in western Alaska, where much of the Iñupiat culture has been in place for perhaps less than 500 years, are greatly affected by phonological influence from the Yupik languages. Eastern Greenlandic, at the opposite end of Inuit range, has had significant word replacement due to a unique form of ritual name avoidance.

Ethnographically, Greenlandic Inuit belong to three groups: the Kalaallit of west Greenland, who speak Kalaallisut; the Tunumiit of Tunu (east Greenland), who speak Tunumiit oraasiat ("East Greenlandic"), and the Inughuit of north Greenland, who speak Inuktun.

The four Yupik languages, by contrast, including Alutiiq (Sugpiaq), Central Alaskan Yup'ik, Naukan (Naukanski), and Siberian Yupik, are distinct languages with phonological, morphological, and lexical differences. They demonstrate limited mutual intelligibility. Additionally, both Alutiiq and Central Yup'ik have considerable dialect diversity. The northernmost Yupik languages – Siberian Yupik and Naukan Yupik – are linguistically only slightly closer to Inuit than is Alutiiq, which is the southernmost of the Yupik languages. Although the grammatical structures of Yupik and Inuit languages are similar, they have pronounced differences phonologically. Differences of vocabulary between Inuit and any one of the Yupik languages are greater than between any two Yupik languages. Even the dialectal differences within Alutiiq and Central Alaskan Yup'ik sometimes are relatively great for locations that are relatively close geographically.

Despite the relatively small population of Naukan speakers, documentation of the language dates back to 1732. While Naukan is only spoken in Siberia, the language acts as an intermediate between two Alaskan languages: Siberian Yupik and Central Yup'ik.

Distribution of language variants across the Arctic

An overview of the Inuit–Yupik–Unangan languages family is given below:

- Inuit–Yupik–Unangan
  - Aleut or Unangan
      - Western-Central dialects: Atkan, Attuan, Unangan, Bering (60–80 speakers)
      - Eastern dialect: Unalaskan, Pribilof (400 speakers)
  - Inuit–Yupik or Eskimo (Yup'ik, Yuit, and Inuit)
    - Yupik
      - Central Alaskan Yup'ik (10,000 speakers)
      - Alutiiq or Pacific Gulf Yup'ik (400 speakers)
      - Central Siberian Yupik or Yuit (Chaplinon and St Lawrence Island, 1,400 speakers)
      - Naukan (700 speakers)
    - Inuit or Inupik (75,000 speakers)
      - Greenlandic (Greenland, 47,000 speakers)
        - Kalaallisut (West Greenlandic, 44,000-52,000 speakers)
        - Tunumiisut (East Greenlandic, 3,500 speakers)
      - Iñupiaq (northern Alaska, 3,500 speakers)
      - Inuvialuktun (western Canada; together with Siglitun, Natsilingmiutut, Inuinnaqtun and Uummarmiutun 765 speakers)
      - Inuktitut (eastern Canada; together with Inuktun and Inuinnaqtun, 30,000 speakers)
      - Inuktun (Avanersuarmiutut, Thule dialect or Polar Eskimo, approximately 1,000 speakers)
    - Sirenik (Sirenikskiy) †

American linguist Lenore Grenoble has explicitly deferred to the ICC resolution and used Inuit–Yupik instead of Eskimo with regards to the language branch.

=== Words for snow ===
Linguists have long debated whether the Inuit–Yupik–Unangan languages have an unusually large number of words for snow. Many of these languages have over fifty words for specific types of snow, both because they have more root words for frozen water, but also because they have a rich derivational system for creating more words, so it depends on the definition of "word".

== Diet ==
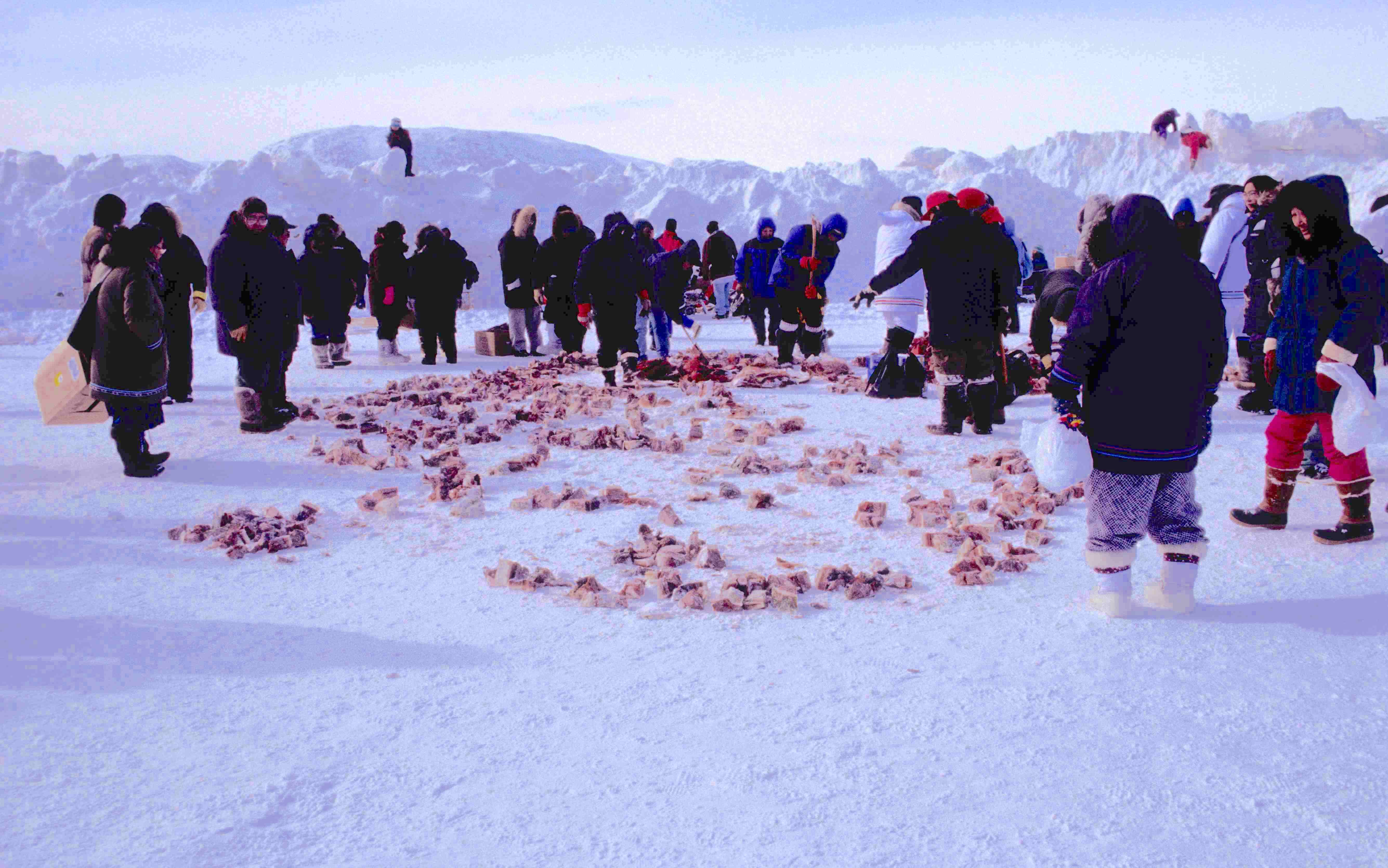
Sharing of frozen, aged walrus meat. Inuit are known for their practice of food sharing, where large catches of food are shared with the broader community.

Historically, Inuit cuisine, which is taken here to include the Greenlandic, the Yupʼik and Aleut cuisines, consisted of a diet of animal source foods that were fished, hunted, and gathered locally.

== Inuit ==
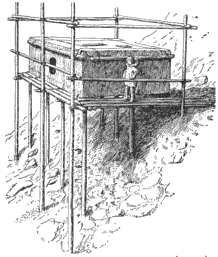
Eskimo (Yup'ik of Nelson Island) fisherman's summer house

Inuit inhabit the Arctic and northern Bering Sea coasts of Alaska in the United States, and Arctic coasts of the Northwest Territories, Nunavut, Quebec, and Labrador in Canada, and Greenland (associated with Denmark). Until fairly recent times, there has been a remarkable homogeneity in the culture throughout this area, which traditionally relied on fish, marine mammals, and land animals for food, heat, light, clothing, and tools. Their food sources primarily relied on seals, whales, whale blubber, walrus, and fish, all of which they hunted using harpoons on the ice. Clothing consisted of robes made of wolfskin and reindeer skin to acclimate to the low temperatures. They maintain a unique Inuit culture.

=== Greenland's Inuit ===
Greenlandic Inuit make up 90% of Greenland's population. They belong to three major groups:

- Kalaallit of west Greenland, who speak Kalaallisut
- Tunumiit of east Greenland, who speak Tunumiisut
- Inughuit of north Greenland, who speak Inuktun or Polar Eskimo.

=== Canadian Inuit ===
Canadian Inuit live primarily in Inuit Nunangat (lit. "lands, waters and ices of the [Inuit]"), their traditional homeland although some people live in southern parts of Canada. Inuit Nunangat ranges from the Yukon–Alaska border in the west across the Arctic to northern Labrador.

The Inuvialuit live in the Inuvialuit Settlement Region, the northern part of Yukon and the Northwest Territories, which stretches to the Amundsen Gulf and the Nunavut border and includes the western Canadian Arctic Islands. The land was demarked in 1984 by the Inuvialuit Final Agreement.

The majority of Inuit live in Nunavut (a territory of Canada), Nunavik (the northern part of Quebec) and in Nunatsiavut (Inuit settlement region in Labrador).

=== Alaska's Iñupiat ===
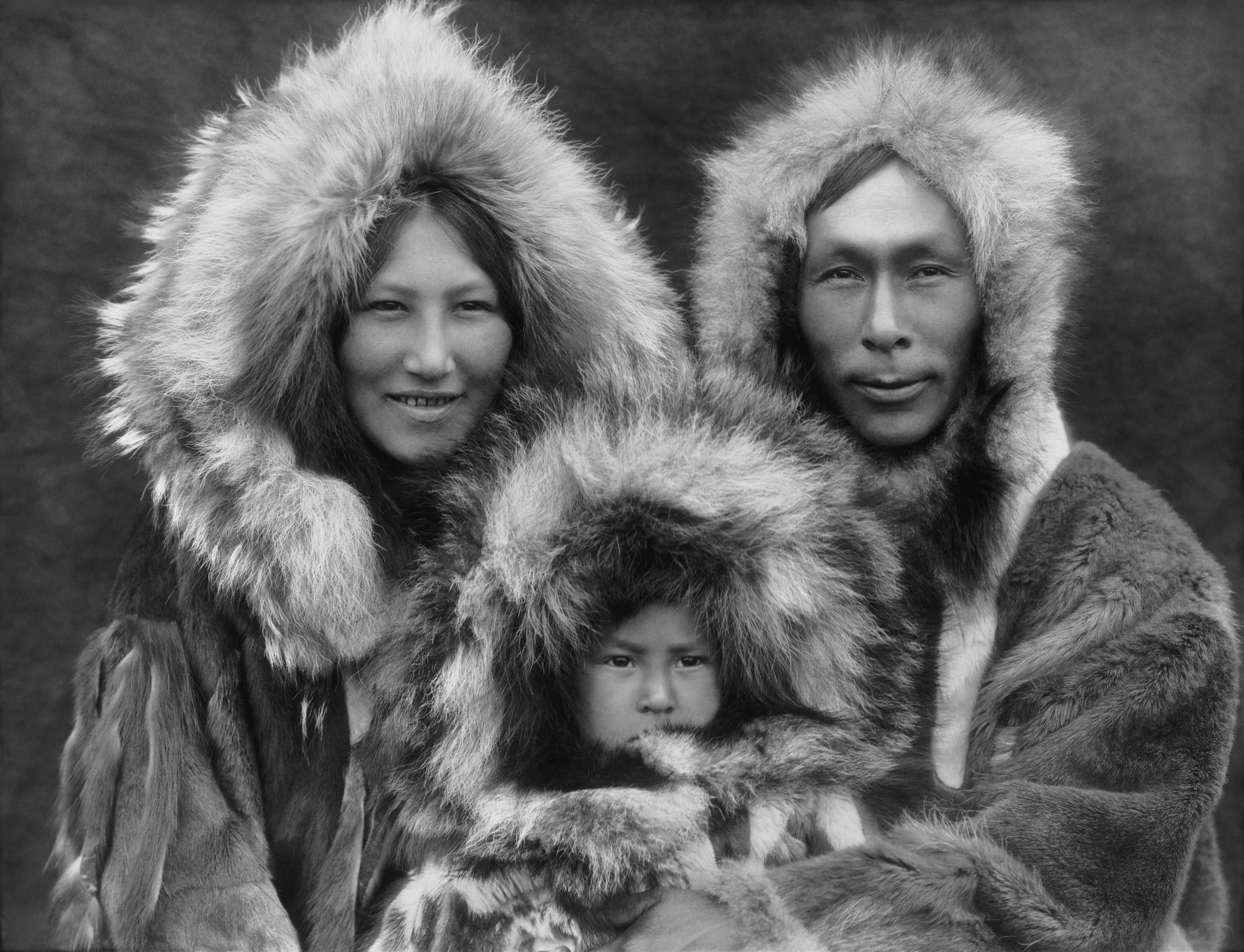
An Iñupiat family from Noatak, Alaska, photographed by Edward S. Curtis, 1929

The Iñupiat are Inuit of Alaska's Northwest Arctic and North Slope boroughs and the Bering Straits region, including the Seward Peninsula. Utqiaġvik, the northernmost city in the United States, is above the Arctic Circle and in the Iñupiat region. Their language is known as Iñupiaq. Their current communities include 34 villages across Iñupiat Nunaŋat (Iñupiaq lands) including seven Alaskan villages in the North Slope Borough, affiliated with the Arctic Slope Regional Corporation; eleven villages in Northwest Arctic Borough; and sixteen villages affiliated with the Bering Straits Regional Corporation.

== Yupik ==
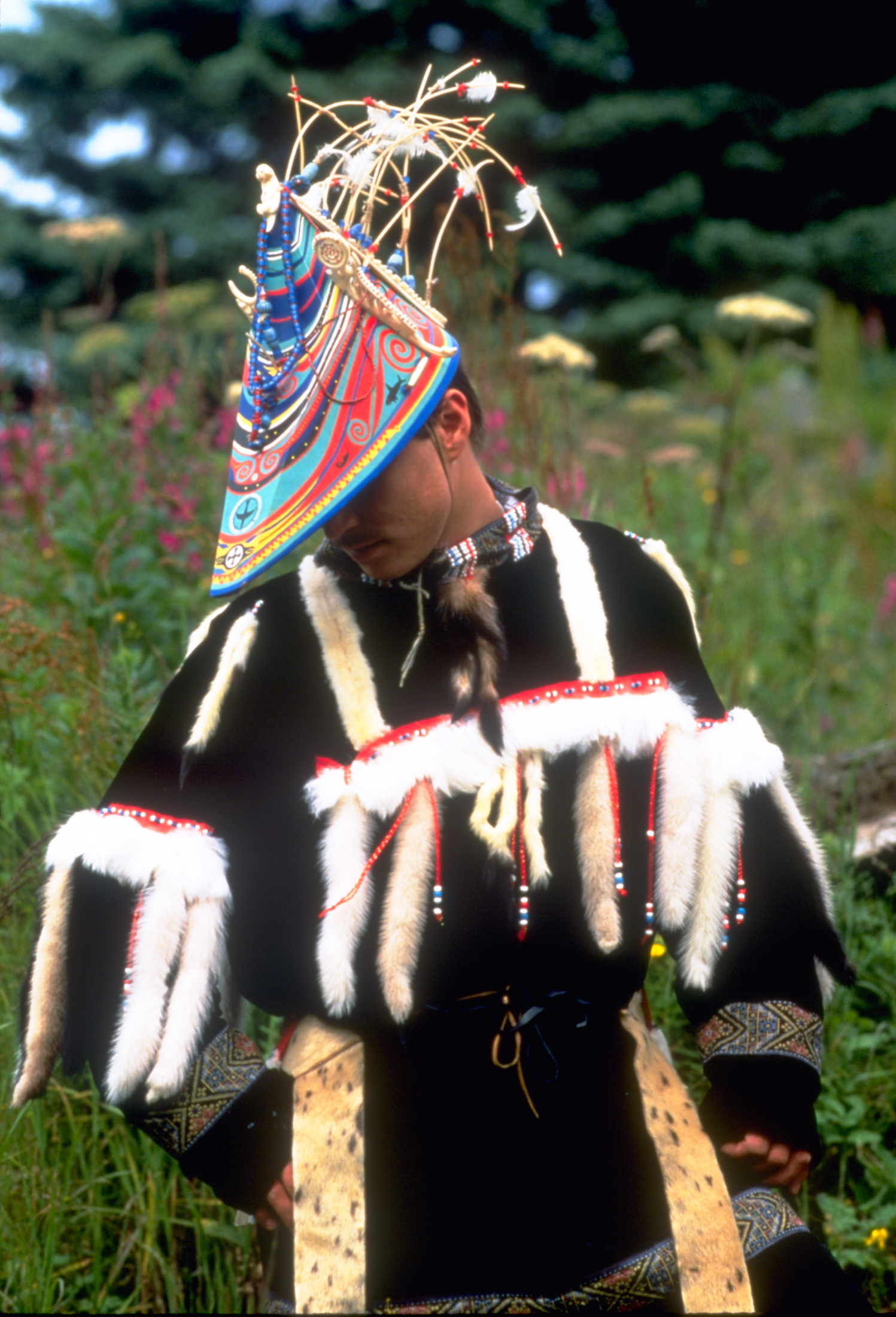
Alutiiq dancer during the biennial "Celebration" cultural event

The Yupik are indigenous or aboriginal peoples who live along the coast of western Alaska, especially on the Yukon-Kuskokwim delta and along the Kuskokwim River (Central Alaskan Yup'ik); in southern Alaska (the Alutiiq); and along the eastern coast of Chukotka in the Russian Far East and St. Lawrence Island in western Alaska (the Siberian Yupik). The Yupik economy has traditionally been strongly dominated by the harvest of marine mammals, especially seals, walrus, and whales.

=== Alutiiq ===
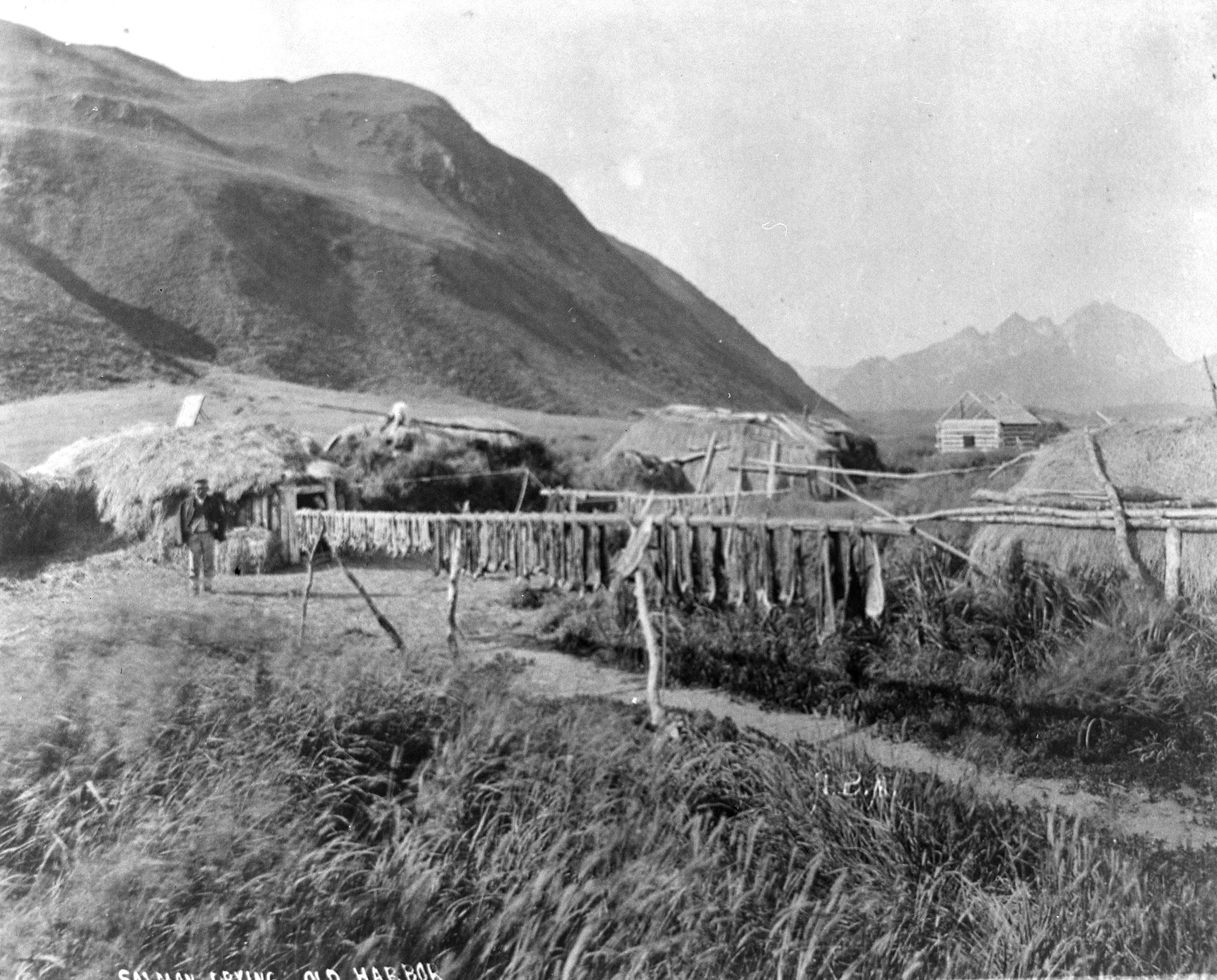
Salmon drying. Alutiiq village, Old Harbor, Kodiak Island. Photographed by N. B. Miller, 1889

The Alutiiq (pronounced /əˈluːtɪk/ ə-LOO-tik in English; from Promyshlenniki Russian Алеутъ, "Aleut"; plural often "Alutiit"), also called by their ancestral name Sugpiaq (/ˈsʊɡˌbjɑːk/ SUUG-byahk or /ˈsʊɡpiˌæk/ SUUG-pee-AK; plural often "Sugpiat"), as well as Pacific Eskimo or Pacific Yupik, are a Yupik peoples, one of eight groups of Alaska Natives that inhabit the southern-central coast of the region.

Their traditional homelands date back to over 7,500 years ago, and include areas such as Prince William Sound and outer Kenai Peninsula (Chugach Sugpiaq), the Kodiak Archipelago and the Alaska Peninsula (Koniag Alutiiq). In the early 1800s there were more than 60 Alutiiq villages in the Kodiak archipelago, with an estimated population of 13,000 people. Today more than 4,000 Alutiiq live in Alaska.

The Alutiiq language is relatively close to that spoken by the Yupik in the Bethel, Alaska area. But, it is considered a distinct language with two major dialects: the Koniag dialect, spoken on the Alaska Peninsula and on Kodiak Island, and the Chugach dialect, spoken on the southern Kenai Peninsula and in Prince William Sound. Residents of Nanwalek, located on southern part of the Kenai Peninsula near Seldovia, speak what they call Sugpiaq. They are able to understand those who speak Yupik in Bethel. With a population of approximately 3,000, and the number of speakers in the hundreds, Alutiiq communities are working to revitalize their language.

=== Central Alaskan Yup'ik ===
Yup'ik, with an apostrophe, denotes the speakers of the Central Alaskan Yup'ik language, who live in western Alaska and southwestern Alaska from southern Norton Sound to the north side of Bristol Bay, on the Yukon–Kuskokwim Delta, and on Nelson Island. The use of the apostrophe in the name Yup'ik is a written convention to denote the long pronunciation of the p sound; but it is spoken the same in other Yupik languages. Of all the Alaska Native languages, Central Alaskan Yup'ik has the most speakers, with about 10,000 of a total Yup'ik population of 21,000 still speaking the language. The five dialects of Central Alaskan Yup'ik include General Central Yup'ik, and the Egegik, Norton Sound, Hooper Bay-Chevak, and Nunivak dialects. In the latter two dialects, both the language and the people are called Cup'ik.

=== Siberian Yupik ===
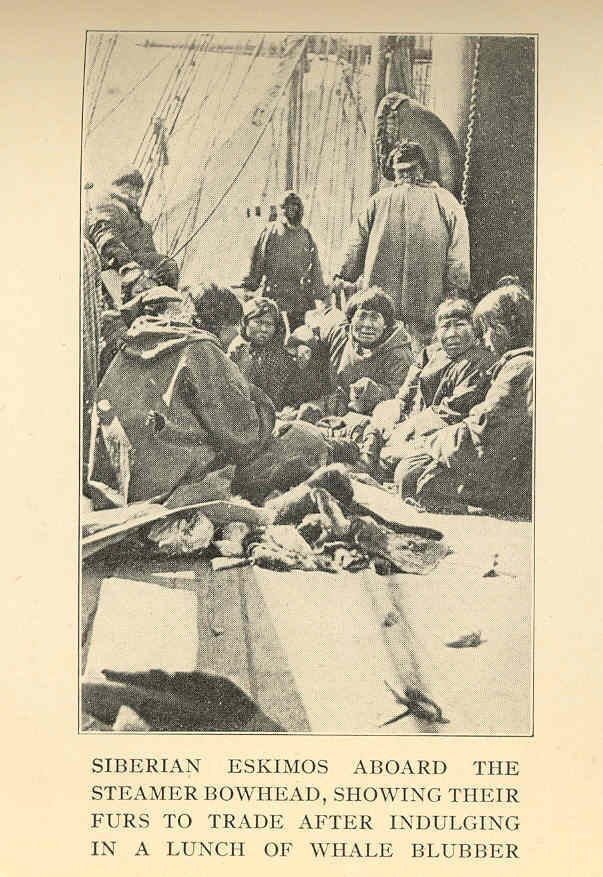
Siberian Yupik aboard the steamer Bowhead

Siberian Yupik reside along the Bering Sea coast of the Chukchi Peninsula in Siberia in the Russian Far East and in the villages of Gambell and Savoonga on St. Lawrence Island in Alaska. The Central Siberian Yupik spoken on the Chukchi Peninsula and on St. Lawrence Island is nearly identical. About 1,050 of a total Alaska population of 1,100 Siberian Yupik people in Alaska speak the language. It is the first language of the home for most St. Lawrence Island children. In Siberia, about 300 of a total of 900 Siberian Yupik people still learn and study the language, though it is no longer learned as a first language by children.

=== Naukan ===
About 70 of 400 Naukan people still speak Naukanski. The Naukan originate on the Chukot Peninsula in Chukotka Autonomous Okrug in Siberia. Despite the relatively small population of Naukan speakers, documentation of the language dates back to 1732. While Naukan is only spoken in Siberia, the language acts as an intermediate between two Alaskan languages: Siberian Yupik Eskimo and Central Yup'ik Eskimo.

== Sireniki ==
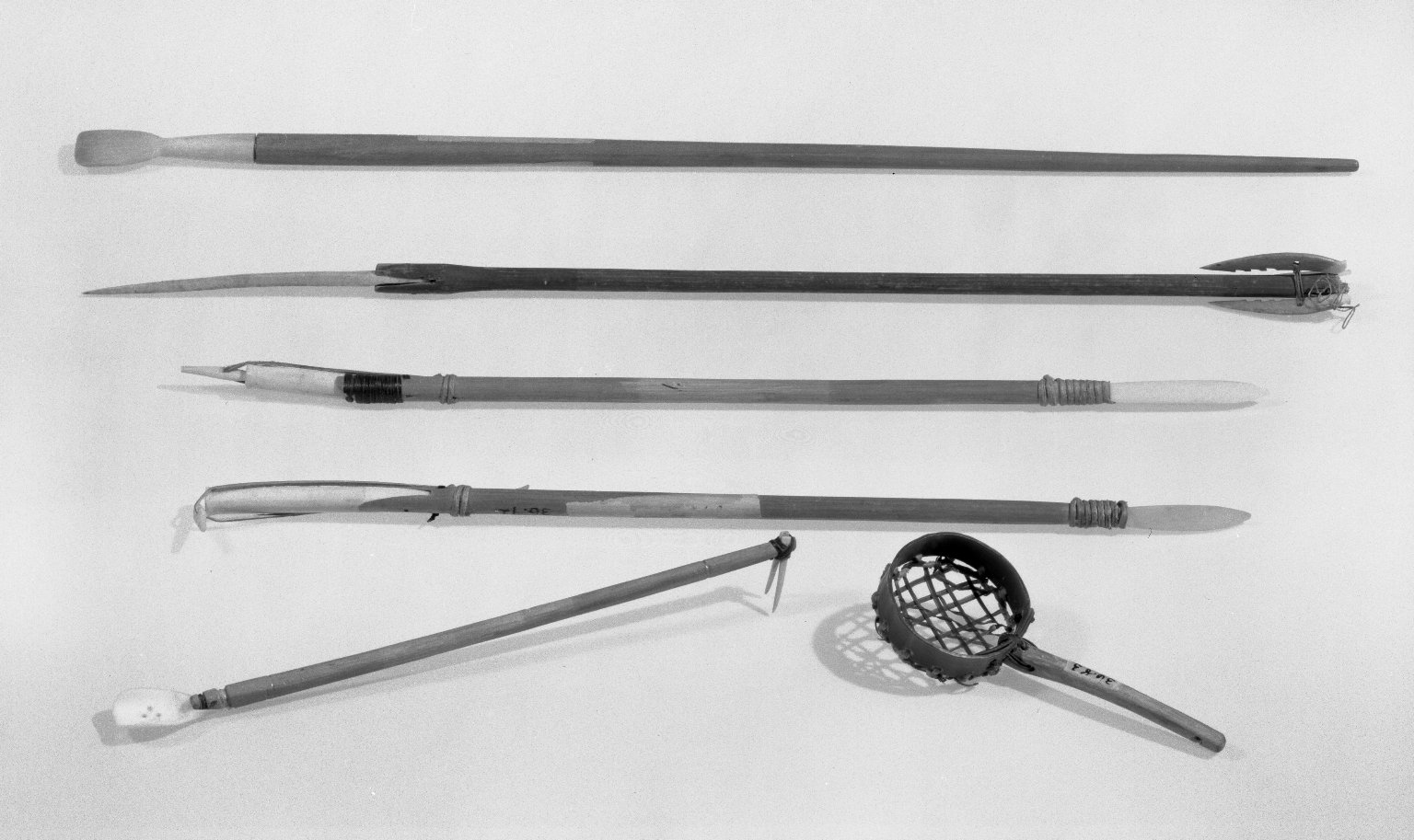
Model of an ice scoop, Alaska Native, 1900–1930, Brooklyn Museum

Some speakers of Siberian Yupik languages used to speak a divergent Inuit–Yupik variant in the past, before they underwent a language shift. These former speakers of the Sirenik language inhabited the settlements of Sireniki, Imtuk, and some small villages stretching to the west from Sireniki along south-eastern coasts of Chukchi Peninsula. They lived in neighborhoods with Siberian Yupik and Chukchi peoples.

As early as in 1895, Imtuk was a settlement with a mixed population of Sireniki and Ungazigmit (the latter belonging to Siberian Yupik). Sirenik culture has been influenced by that of Chukchi, and the language shows Chukchi language influences. Folktale motifs also show the influence of Chuckchi culture.

The above peculiarities of this (already extinct) Inuit–Yupik language amounted to mutual unintelligibility even with its nearest language relatives: in the past, Sireniki had to use the unrelated Chukchi language as a lingua franca for communicating with Siberian Yupik.

Many words are formed from entirely different roots from in Siberian Yupik, but even the grammar has several peculiarities distinct not only among Inuit–Yupik languages, but even compared to Aleut. For example, dual number is not known in Sirenik, while most Inuit–Yupik–Unangan languages have dual, including its neighboring Siberian Yupikax relatives.

Little is known about the origin of this diversity. The peculiarities of this language may be the result of a supposed long isolation from other Inuit and Yupik groups, and being in contact only with speakers of unrelated languages for many centuries. The influence of the Chukchi language is clear.

Because of all these factors, the classification of the Sirenik language is not settled yet: Sireniki language is sometimes regarded as a third branch of Inuit–Yupik (at least, its possibility is mentioned). Sometimes it is regarded rather as a group belonging to the Yupik branch.

== See also ==
- Alaska Native religion
- Blond Eskimos
- Disc number
- Eskimo archery
- Eskimo kinship (outdated name for Inuit Kinship)
- Eskimo kissing
- Eskimo yo-yo
- Eskimology
- Inuit religion
- Kudlik
- Maupuk
- Nanook of the North, 1922 documentary
- Saqqaq culture

== General and cited sources ==
- Kaplan, Lawrence D. (1990). "The Language of the Alaskan Inuit" (PDF). In Dirmid R. F. Collis (ed.). Arctic Languages. An Awakening. Vendôme: UNESCO. pp. 131–158. ISBN 92-3-102661-5.
- Menovshchikov, Georgy (1990). "Contemporary Studies of the Eskimo–Aleut Languages and Dialects: A Progress Report" (PDF). In Collis, Dirmid R. F. (ed.). Arctic Languages. An Awakening. Vendôme: UNESCO. pp. 69–76. ISBN 92-3-102661-5.
- Nuttall, Mark (2005). Encyclopedia of the Arctic. New York: Routledge. ISBN 978-1-57958-436-8.
- Vakhtin, Nikolai (1998). "Endangered Languages in Northeast Siberia: Siberian Yupik and other Languages of Chukotka". In Erich Kasten (ed.). Bicultural Education in the North: Ways of Preserving and Enhancing Indigenous Peoples' Languages and Traditional Knowledge (PDF). Münster: Waxmann Verlag. pp. 159–173. ISBN 978-3-89325-651-8. Archived from the original on April 13, 2007.
- "Inuit or Eskimo: Which name to use?". Alaska Native Language Center.

=== Cyrillic ===
- Menovshchikov, Georgy (1964). Yazyk sirenikskikh eskimosov. Fonetika, ocherk morfologii, teksty i slovar' Язык сиреникских эскимосов. Фонетика, очерк морфологии, тексты и словарь [Language of Sireniki Eskimos. Phonetics, morphology, texts and vocabulary] (in Russian). Moscow, Leningrad: Академия Наук СССР. Институт языкознания.
