= Languages of Greenland =

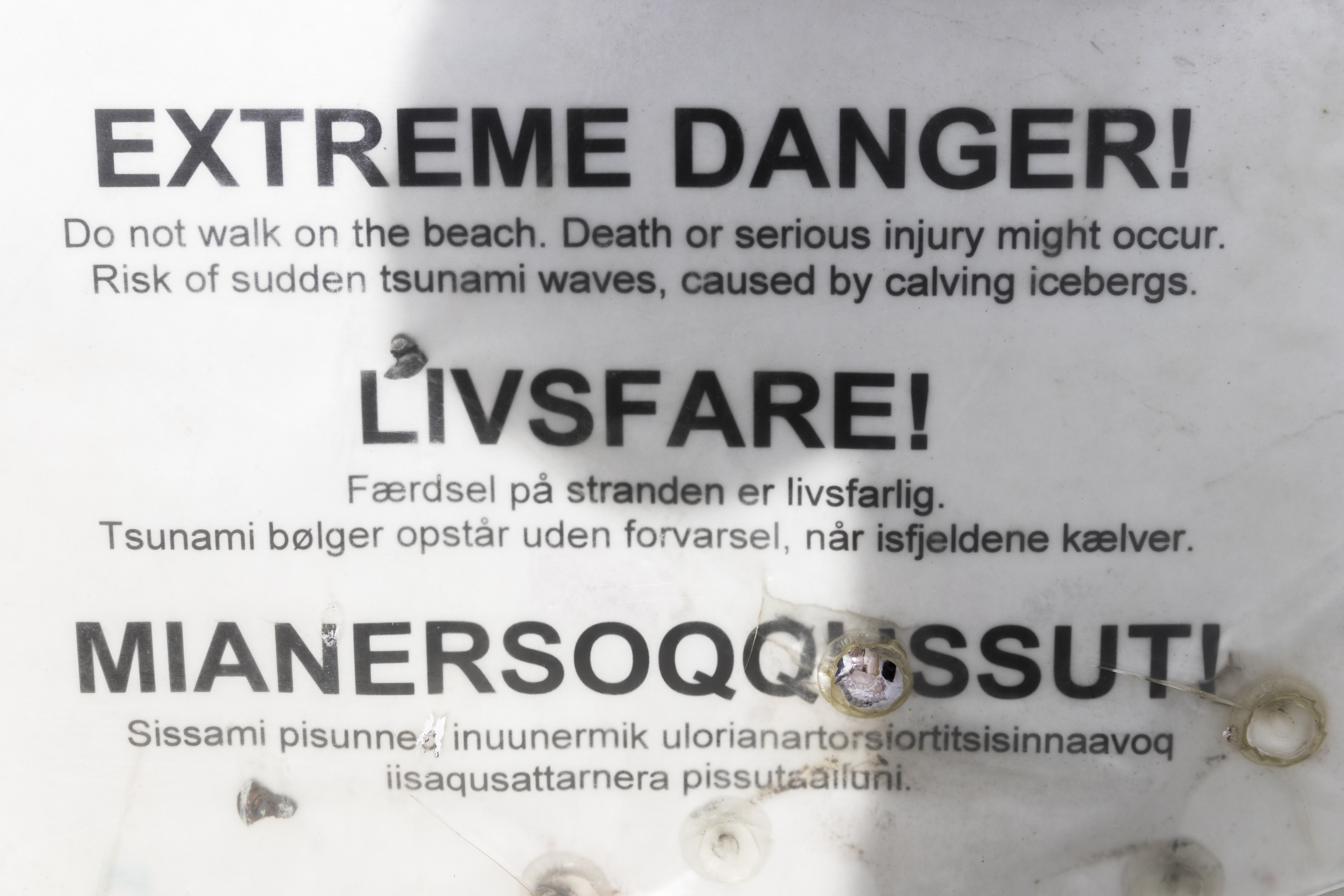
- Sign in Ilulissat in English, Danish and Greenlandic
- Official: Greenlandic
- Recognised: Danish
- Immigrant: English; Filipino; Thai; Icelandic; Swedish; Norwegian; Finnish; French; Romanian; Bulgarian; Other
- Foreign: English; Norwegian / Swedish; French / German / Spanish
- Signed: Greenlandic Sign Language
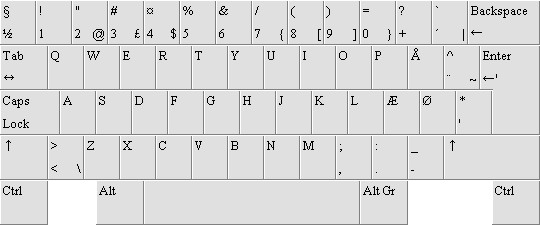
- Keyboard layout: QWERTY; Danish
- Source: Statistics Greenland (2008)

The official language of Greenland is Greenlandic. The number of speakers of Greenlandic is estimated at 50,000 (85–90% of the total population), divided in three main dialects, Kalaallisut (West-Greenlandic, 44,000 speakers and the dialect that is used as official language), Tunumiit (East-Greenlandic, 3,000 speakers) and Inuktun (North-Greenlandic, 800 speakers). The remainder of the population mainly speaks Danish; Greenlandic Sign Language is the language of the deaf community.

Greenland has been a very isolated and linguistically homogeneous island historically, but has nevertheless been home to several languages. Greenlandic Norse is believed to have been in language contact with Greenlandic, the language of the indigenous Kalaallit, and to have left loanwords in that language. It has been suggested that the female given name Kuuna derives from kona, the Old Norse word for "woman" and "wife".

The available evidence does not establish the presence of language attrition; the language most likely disappeared with the ethnic group that spoke it.

Greenlandic is not only the national language, but is now "the official language in Greenland" by virtue of Act no. 473, adopted by parliament 12 June 2009, the Act on Greenland Self-Government.

Studying Danish and English is mandatory for students in compulsory schools and also part of many secondary-level study programmes, so knowledge of the two languages is widespread. Other foreign languages frequently studied include German and French.

Temporary visitors and residents often make up a large portion of the population, especially in Ilulissat and the capital Nuuk.

In May 2023, a Greenlandic MP, Aki-Matilda Høegh-Dam, spoke her native language during a debate in the Danish parliament, causing a controversy and highlighting strained relations between Denmark and Greenland.

== See also ==
- Greenlandic
