= Ulu =

Traditional all-purpose knife of Inuit, Yupik and Aleut women

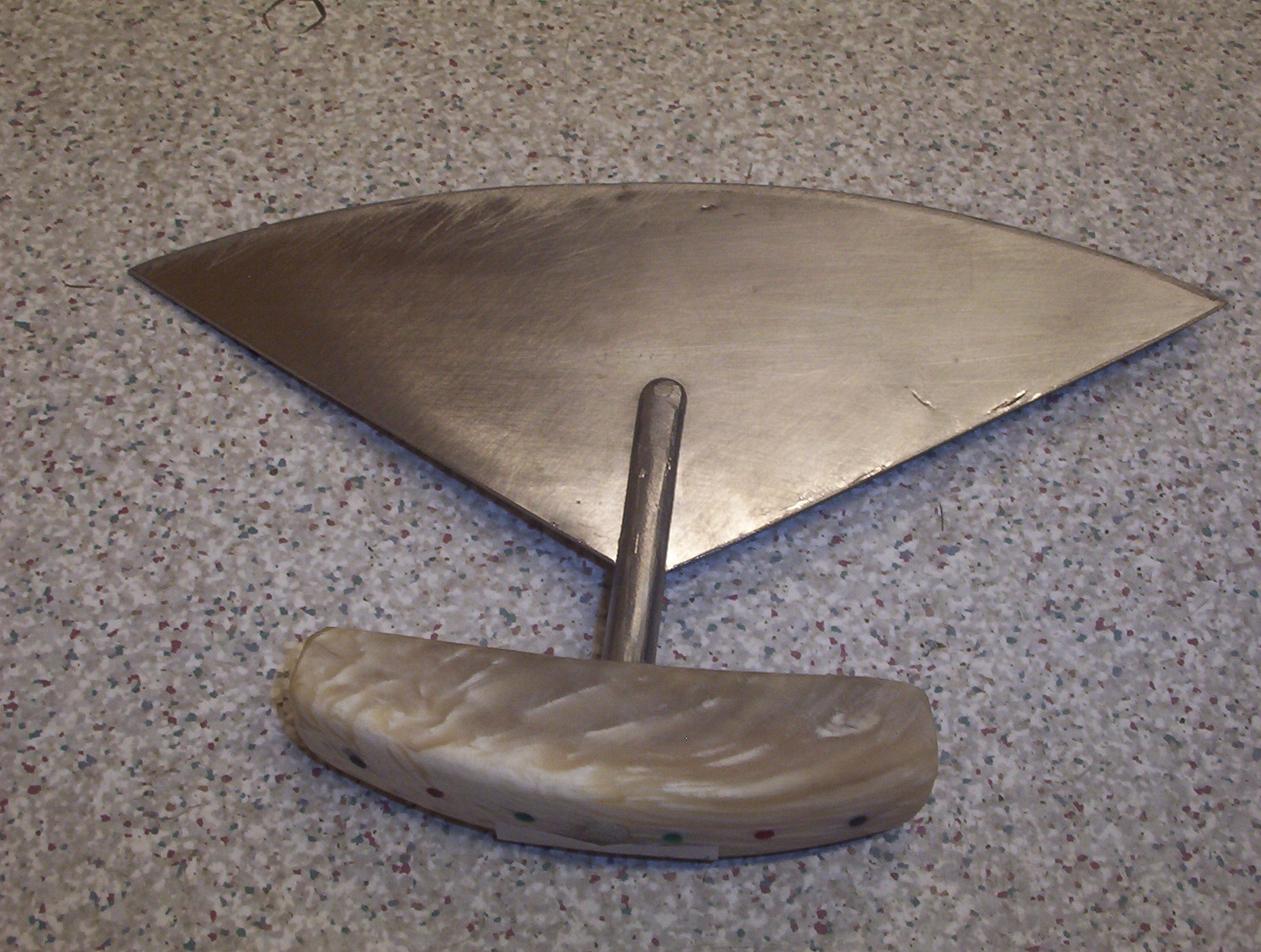
An ulu in the western Arctic style

An ulu (Inuktitut: ᐅᓗ; plural: uluit; sometimes referred to as 'woman's knife') is an all-purpose knife traditionally used by Inuit, Iñupiat, Yupik, and Aleut women. It is used in applications as diverse as skinning and cleaning animals, cutting a child's hair, cutting food, and sometimes even trimming blocks of snow and ice used to build an igloo. They are widely sold as souvenirs in Alaska.

== Name ==
In the Nunatsiavummiutut variety of Inuttitut, which is spoken in Nunatsiavut (Northern Labrador), the word is spelled uluk, and in Tunumiisut (East Greenlandic) it is sakiaq or saakiq.

The following chart lists both Eskaleut terms as well as two terms for the same tool in Athabaskan languages, which are an unrelated language family spoken by non-Inuit-Iñupiat-Aleut Alaska Natives.

language	singular	dual	plural
Yukon-Kuskokwim Yup'ik	uluaq	uluak	uluat
Chevak Cup'ik (a Yupik language)	kegginalek	kegginalgek	kegginalget
Nunivak Cup'ig (a Yupik language)	ulluar		
Iñupiaq language	ulu ~ uluuraq		
Inuinnaqtun / Inuvialuktun (Central / Western Canadian Inuit language)	ulu		
Inuktitut (Eastern Canadian Inuit language)	ulu (ᐅᓗ)	uluuk (ᐅᓘᒃ)	uluit (ᐅᓗᐃᑦ)
Inuttitut (an Eastern Canadian Inuit language)	uluk	ulok	uluit
Greenlandic (Western Greenlandic Inuit language)	ulu		ulut
Tunumiisut (East Greenlandic Inuit Language)	sakiaq ~ saakiq		
Koyukon (an Athabaskan language)	tlaabaas		
Holikachuk (an Athabaskan language)	tthamas		

== Materials ==
Traditionally the ulu was made with a caribou antler, muskox horn, or walrus ivory handle and slate cutting surface, due to the lack of metal smelting technology in the Arctic. The handle could also be carved from bone, and wood was sometimes used when it was available. In certain areas, such as Ulukhaktok ("where there is material for ulus"), Northwest Territories, copper was used for the cutting surface.

The modern ulu is still often made with a caribou antler handle but the blade is usually made of steel. The steel is often obtained by purchasing a hand saw or wood saw and cutting the blade to the correct shape. A hardwood called sisattaq is also used for handles. Uluit are often home made, but there is also an industry of commercially produced uluit, sometimes made with a plastic handle and complete with a cutting board.

The Copper Inuit of Victoria Island used copper they mined to make ulu blades. When slate and copper were scarce, some Inuit turned to whale baleen or ivory for the blades.

== Usage and styles ==
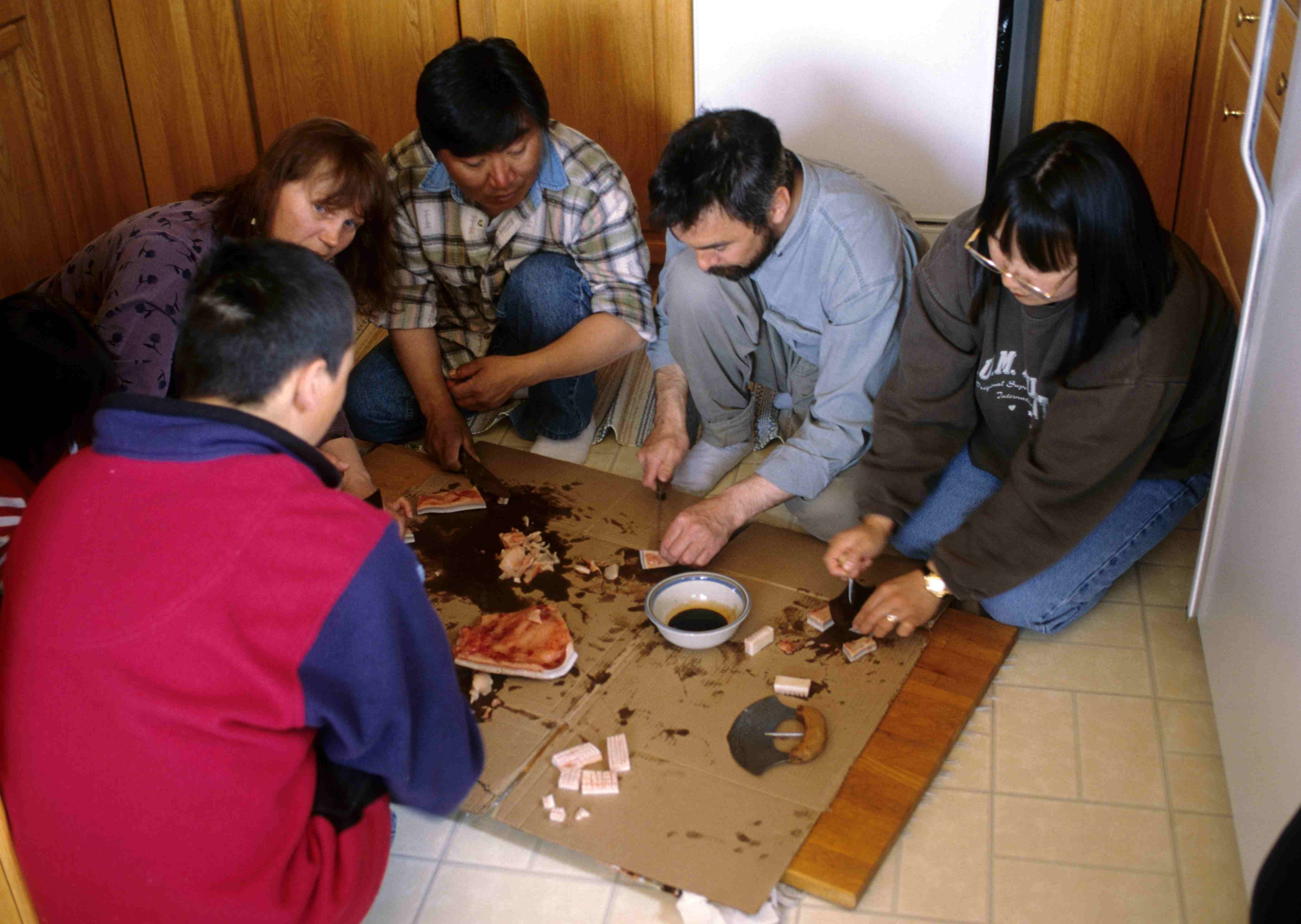
Feast of muktuk with uluit in use: The woman on the right is using an ulu to cut muktuk; a larger ulu is lying on the cardboard in front of her. (1997)

The size of the ulu typically reflects its usage. An ulu with a 5 cm (2.0 in) blade would be used as part of a sewing kit to cut sinew or for cutting out patterns from animal skins to make Inuit clothing and kamiit (shoes). An ulu with a 15 cm (5.9 in) blade would be used for general purposes. Occasionally, uluit can be found with blades as large as 30 cm (12 in).

The ulu comes in four distinct styles, the Iñupiat (or Alaskan), Canadian, Kalaallit (West Greenlandic) and Tunumiit (East Greenlandic). With the Iñupiat style ulu, the blade has a centre piece cut out and both ends of the blade fit into the handle. In Canada, the blade more often is attached to the handle by a single stem in the centre. In the western areas of the Canadian Arctic, the blade of the ulu tends to be of a triangular shape, while in the eastern Arctic, the ends of the blade tend to be more pointed.

The shape of the ulu ensures that the force is centred more over the middle of the blade than with an ordinary knife. This makes the ulu easier to use when cutting hard objects such as bone. Because the rocking motion used when cutting on a plate or board with an ulu pins down the food being cut, it is also easier to use an ulu one-handed (a typical steak knife, in contrast, requires a fork).

Uluit are sometimes used for purposes other than their original intent. Because of their cultural symbolism throughout the Arctic, they are sometimes presented to people who have accomplished significant achievements in fields such as sports or education. Specifically, the Arctic Winter Games presents ulu-shaped medals to successful athletes, acting in place of a regular medal.

Uluit are also used as an educational resource, as they can useful in teaching geometry, the history of circumpolar peoples, the role of Inuit women, an understanding Inuit culture, and traditional tool use.

== History ==
Uluit have been found that date back to as early as 2500 BCE.

Blades of the first uluit were made out of stone, but after making contact with whalers in the 19th century, the material used for blades changed quickly to steel. By the 1880s in Alaska, the Iñupiat began to frequently transform steel saw blades into ulu blades.

In the early 20th century ulu collections were displayed to the American public, lending support to an interest in Arctic exploration and in studying the culture of indigenous people of the north. Later, the uluit were also produced as souvenirs for the exchange of goods with sailors, and could often have no utilitarian value.

Since 1970, in the Arctic Winter Games small ulu-shaped medals have been given to the winners. There are gold and silver ulu medals, as well as bronze ones, which replaced the formerly used copper ulu medals.

In 2019 Robin Anna Smith won third place in The Peggy Willis Lyles Haiku Awards for 2019 of The Heron's Nest magazine, with an English-language haiku about an ulu:

carving
the snow
ulu moon.

Ulu knives are widely sold to tourists as souvenirs throughout Alaska.

== Legality ==
Some countries, including Canada, prohibit the possession or carrying of knives where the blade is perpendicular to the handle (intended to limit the use of so-called "push daggers"). However, regulations passed under the Criminal Code specifically exempt the "aboriginal 'ulu' knife" from this prohibition.

In the United States uluit are not allowed on commercial airline flights as carry-on luggage, though they can be in checked baggage.

== Gallery ==
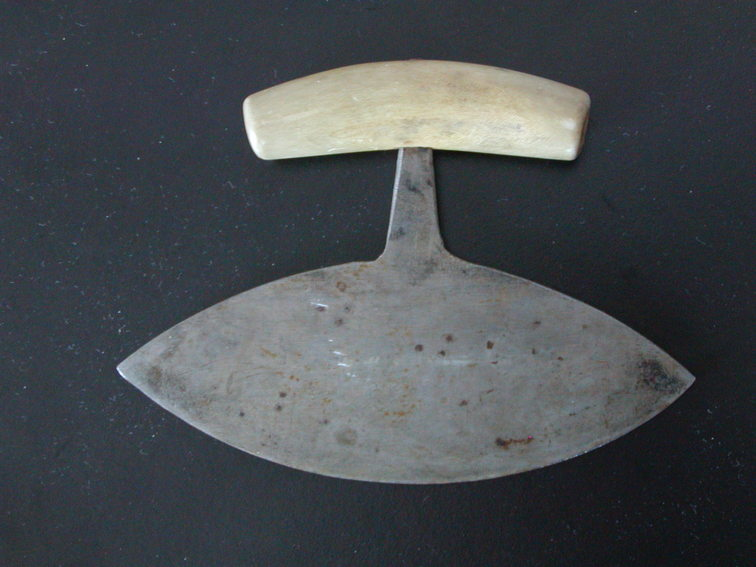
West Greenlandic (Kalaallit) ulu

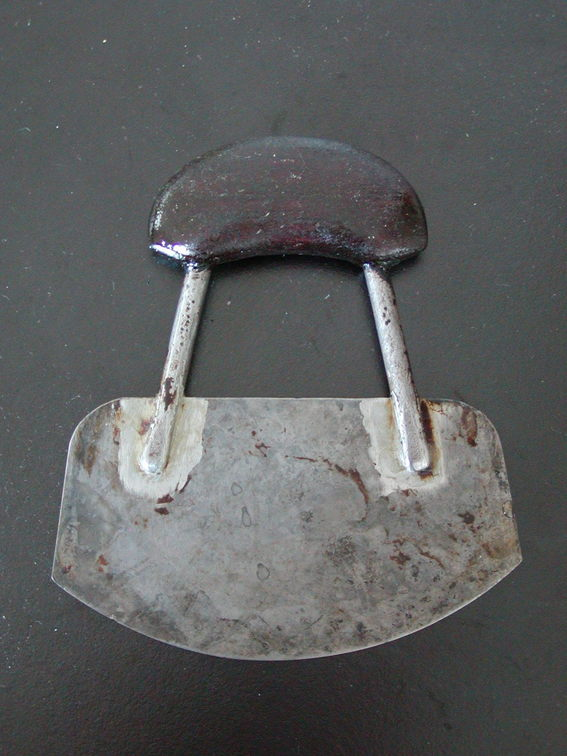
East Greenlandic (Tunumiit) ulu

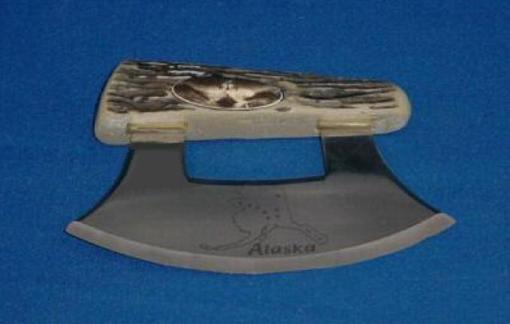
A souvenir ulu from Alaska

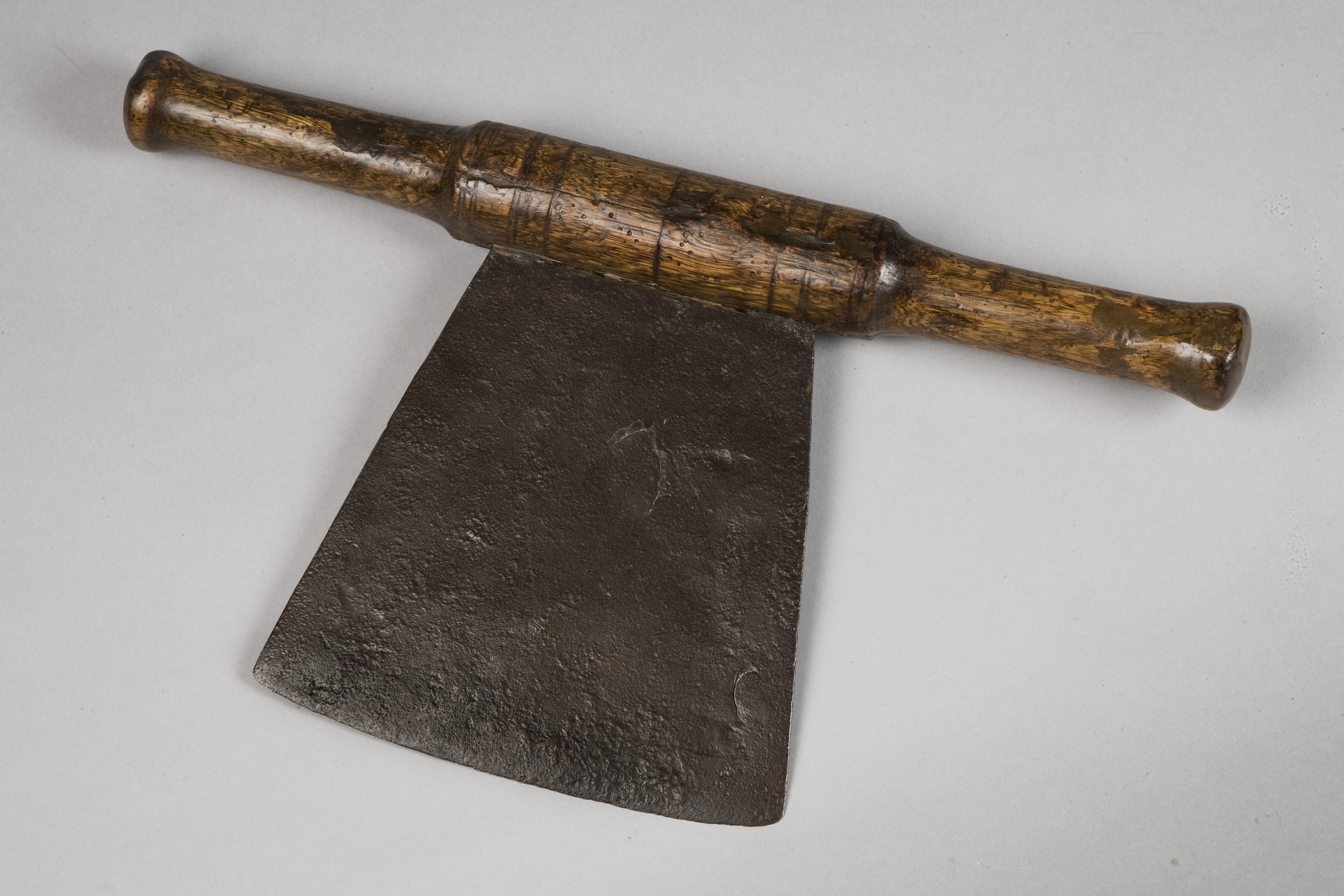
19th century Italian knife for meat (mannaia tritacarne), resembling an ulu and having a similar function

== See also ==
- Kartika
- Mezzaluna
- Putty knife
- Tumi
- Scraper
