= Greenlandic Inuit =

Ethnic group indigenous to Greenland

kalaallit
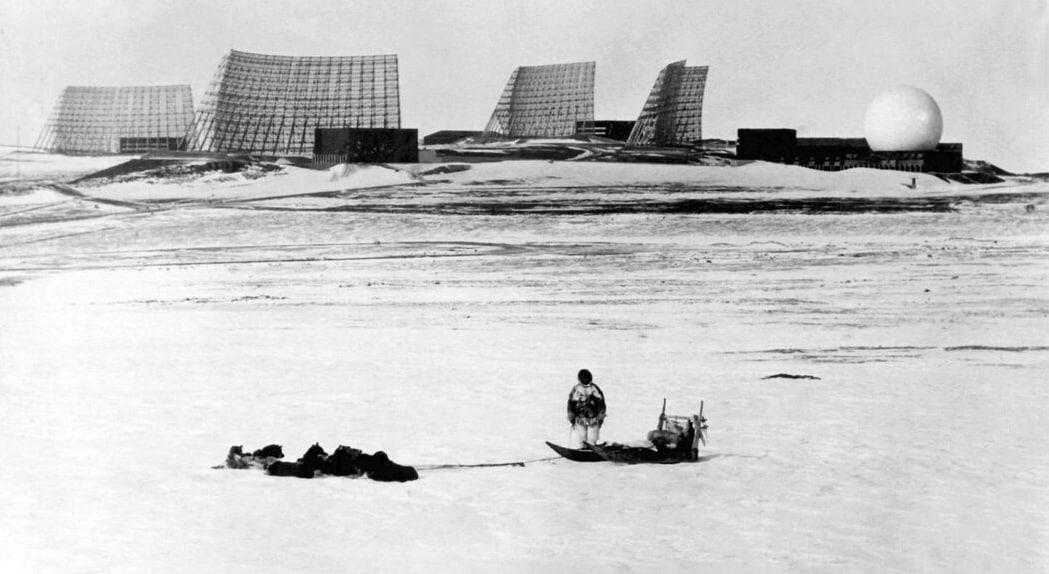
- An Inuk man with a dog sled looks at the United States Air Force radar station Thule Site J in 1966.

Total population
- c. 70,000

Regions with significant populations
- Greenland: 51,349
- Denmark: 16,470
- United States: 352
- Norway: 293
- Faroe Islands: 163
- Iceland: 65
- Canada: 55
- Netherlands: 14

Languages
- Primary; Greenlandic; Secondary; Danish; English

Religion
- Majority; Christianity (Church of Greenland); Minority; Inuit religion; others

Related ethnic groups
- other Inuit

Greenlandic Inuit population, 1750-2000

The Greenlandic Inuit (Note: Greenlandic: kalaallit Danish: Grønlandsk Inuit) or sometimes simply the Greenlandic (Note: Although the term 'Greenlandic' is applied to all citizens of Greenland, regardless of their ethnic background; in some instances, the term is used specifically to refer to the Inuit population.) are an ethnic group native to Greenland, where they constitute the largest ethnic population. They share a common ancestry, culture, and history; they natively speak one of the three Greenlandic languages. As Greenland is a country within the Kingdom of Denmark, citizens of Greenland are both citizens of Denmark and of the European Union.

Approximately 89 percent of Greenland's population of 57,695 is Greenlandic Inuit, or 51,349 people as of 2012. Ethnographically, they consist of three major groups:

- the Kalaallit of west Greenland, who speak Kalaallisut
- the Tunumiit of Tunu (east Greenland), who speak Tunumiit oraasiat ("East Greenlandic")
- the Inughuit of north Greenland, who speak Inuktun ("Polar Inuit")

Historically, Kalaallit referred specifically to the people of Western Greenland. Northern Greenlanders call themselves Avanersuarmiut or Inughuit, and Eastern Greenlanders call themselves Tunumiit, respectively.

Most Greenlanders are bilingual speakers of Kalaallisut and Danish and most trace their lineage to the first Inuit that came to Greenland. The vast majority of ethnic Greenlanders reside in Greenland or elsewhere in the Danish Realm, primarily Denmark proper (approximately 20,000 Greenlanders reside in Denmark proper). A small minority reside in other countries, mostly elsewhere in Scandinavia and North America. The average Greenlander has 75% Inuit ancestry and 25% European ancestry, tracing about half of their paternal DNA to Danish male ancestors.

== Regions ==
Inuit are descended from the Thule people, who settled Greenland in between AD 1200 and 1400. As 84 percent of Greenland's land mass is covered by the Greenland ice sheet, Inuit live in three regions: Polar, Eastern, and Western. In the 1850s, additional Canadian Inuit joined the Polar Inuit communities.

The Eastern Inuit, or Tunumiit, live in the area with the mildest climate, a territory called Tunu or Tasiilaq. Hunters can hunt marine mammals from kayaks throughout the year.

== Language ==
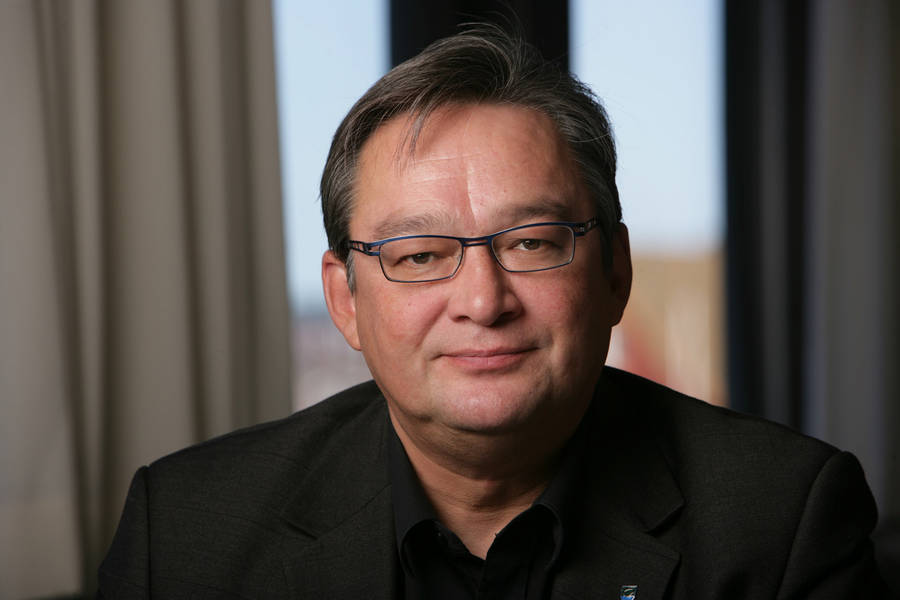
Kuupik Kleist, former Prime Minister of Greenland (2009–2013)

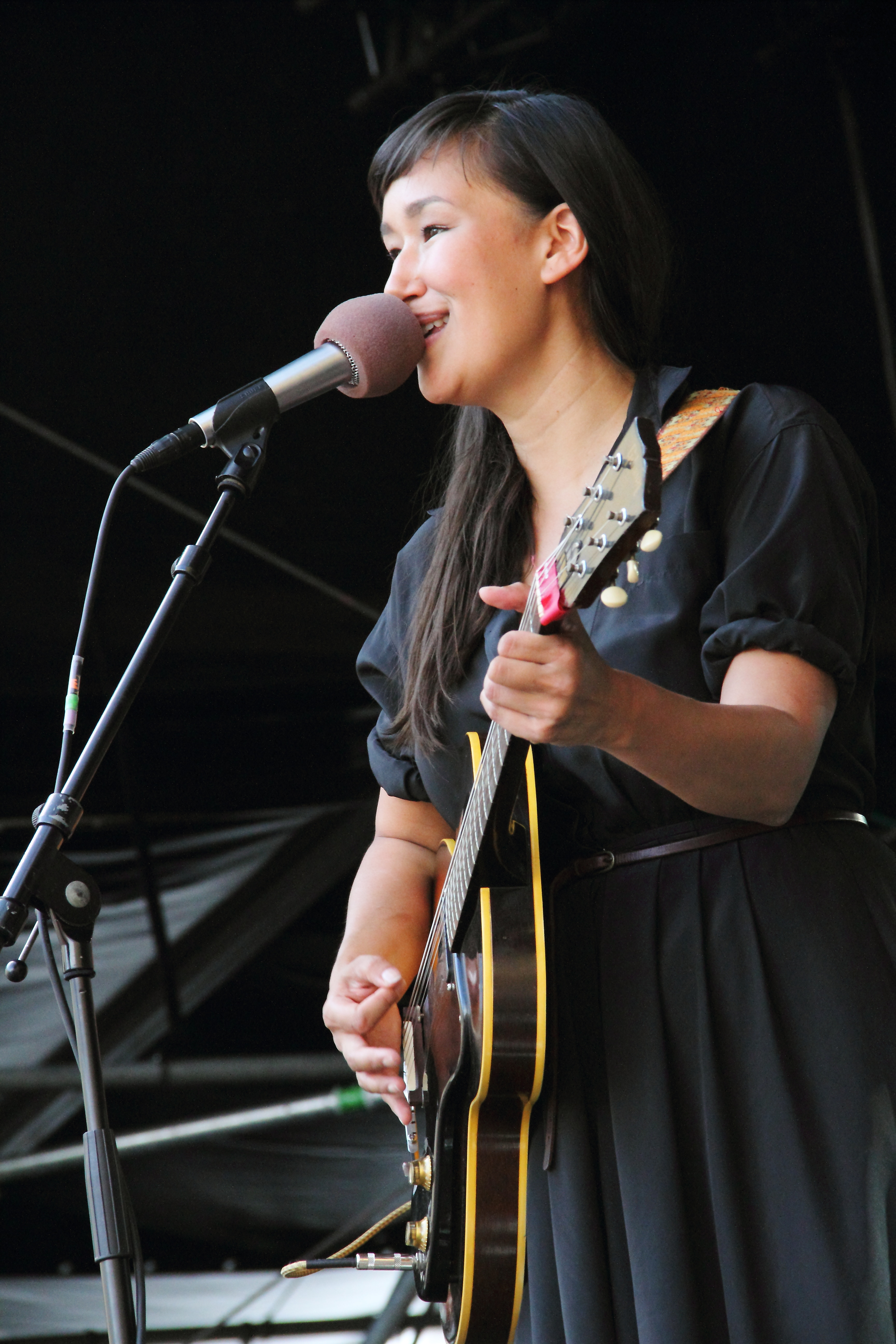
Nive Nielsen, Inuk singer and songwriter from Greenland, 2016

Kalaallisut is the official language of Greenland. It is the western variety of the Greenlandic language, which is one of the Inuit languages within the Eskimo-Aleut family. Kalaallisut is taught in schools and used widely in Greenlandic media.

== History ==
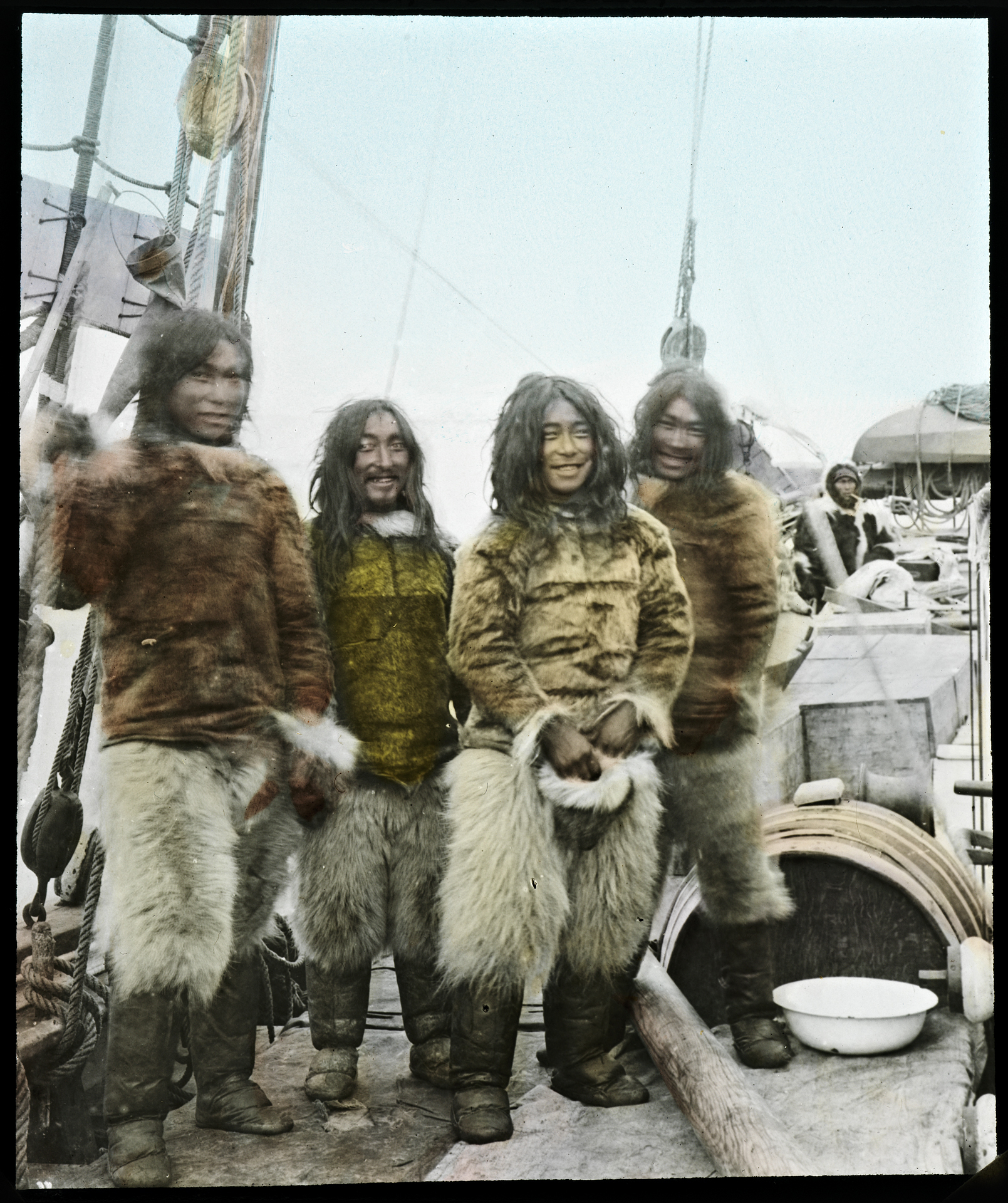
Greenlandic Inuit in 1903

The first people arrived in Greenland from the Canadian island of Ellesmere, around 2500 to 2000 BCE, from where they colonized north Greenland as the Independence I culture and south Greenland as the Saqqaq culture. The Early Dorset replaced these early Greenlanders around 700 BCE, and themselves lived on the island until c. 1 CE. These people were unrelated to the Inuit. Save for a Late Dorset recolonisation of northeast Greenland c. 700 CE, the island was then uninhabited until the Norse arrived in the 980s. Between 1000 and 1400, the Thule, ancestors of the Inuit, replaced the Dorset in Arctic Canada, and then moved into Greenland from the north. The Norse disappeared from southern Greenland in the 15th century, and although Scandinavians revisited the island in the 16th and 17th centuries, they did not resettle until 1721. In 1814, the Treaty of Kiel confirmed Greenland as a territory of Denmark.

The primary method of survival for the Thule was hunting seal, narwhal, and walrus as well as gathering local plant material. Archaeological evidence of animal remains suggests that the Thule were well adjusted to Greenland and in such a way that they could afford to leave potential sources of fat behind.

European visitors to Northeast Greenland before the early 19th century reported evidence of extensive Inuit settlement in the region although they encountered no humans. In 1823, Douglas Charles Clavering met a group of twelve Inuit in Clavering Island. Later expeditions, starting with the Second German North Polar Expedition in 1869, found the remains of many former settlements, but the population had apparently died out during the intervening years.

In 1979, the Greenlanders voted to become autonomous. There is an active independence movement.

The population of Greenlandic Inuit has fluctuated over the years. A smallpox outbreak reduced the population from 8,000 to 6,000 in the 18th century. The population doubled in 1900 to 12,000 then steadily rose by around 100 people each year from 1883 to 1919. This increase in population rose to 275 on average per year between 1920 to 1949, resulting in another doubling of the population in this timespan. This population growth were driven by an effective Danish program to combat Tuberculosis, as well as Danish investment in improvement of living conditions such as newer houses, and safer drinking water supplies.

In 1950 and 1960 Denmark implemented the G50 and G60 plans, with the aim of further modernization of Greenland. As an effect of this the population increase reached 800 per year in the period of 1950-1979.

In the latter half of the 1960s onwards Denmark intitiated an IUD campaign. This is known as the Spiral Case.

Between around 1966 and 1975, thousands of Greenlandic Inuit girls and women had intrauterine devices (IUDs) inserted to prevent pregnancy. Half of the 9,000 women in Greenland of child bearing age was given an IUD in the first five years of the program. Some of the affected girls were as young as 12, and in some cases, women (and in the case of girls, their parents) did not consent to the procedure. The overall population nonetheless kept increasing, reaching 41,000 by 1980.

== Society ==
Gender roles among Greenlandic Inuit are flexible; however, historically men hunted and women prepared the meat and skins. Most marriages are by choice, as opposed to arranged; monogamy is commonplace. Extended families are important to Inuit society.

Greenland Inuit diet consists of a combination of local or traditional dishes and imported foods; the majority of Inuit, aged 18 to 25 and 60 and older, preferring customary, local foods like whale skin and dried cod over imported foods like sausage or chicken. That study also reveals that those who grew up in villages only consumed local, Inuit cuisine foods 31 times a month and those who lived in Danish areas would consume local, Inuit cuisine 17 times per month. The reasons for the lack of traditional food consumption varies, but 48 percent of respondents claim that they wanted to have variety in their diet, 45 percent of respondents said it was difficult to obtain traditional foods, and 39 percent said that traditional foods were too expensive.

The kinds of whale that have been historically hunted and consumed are the Minke and Fin whales, both are under watch by the International Whaling Commission (IWC). Greenland Home Rule implemented IWC quotas on aboriginal whale hunting, reducing hunting of Minke whales to a maximum of 115 per year and Fin whales to 21 per year.

== Art and spirituality ==
The Greenlandic Inuit have a strong artistic practice including sewing animal skins (skin-sewing) and making masks. They are also known for an art form of figures called tupilait or "evil spirit objects". Sperm whale ivory (teeth) remains a valued medium for carving.

Customary art-making practices thrive in Ammassalik Island. Ammassalik wooden maps are carved maps of the Greenlandic coastline, used in the late 19th century.

Greenlandic Inuit believed that spirits inhabited every human joint, even knucklebones.

== See also ==
- Greenlanders in Denmark
- Greenlandic Americans
- List of features in Greenland named after Greenlandic Inuit
- Inuit Circumpolar Council
