= Tunumiit =

Group of Greenlandic Inuit

Iivit Tunumiit Eastern Greenlanders
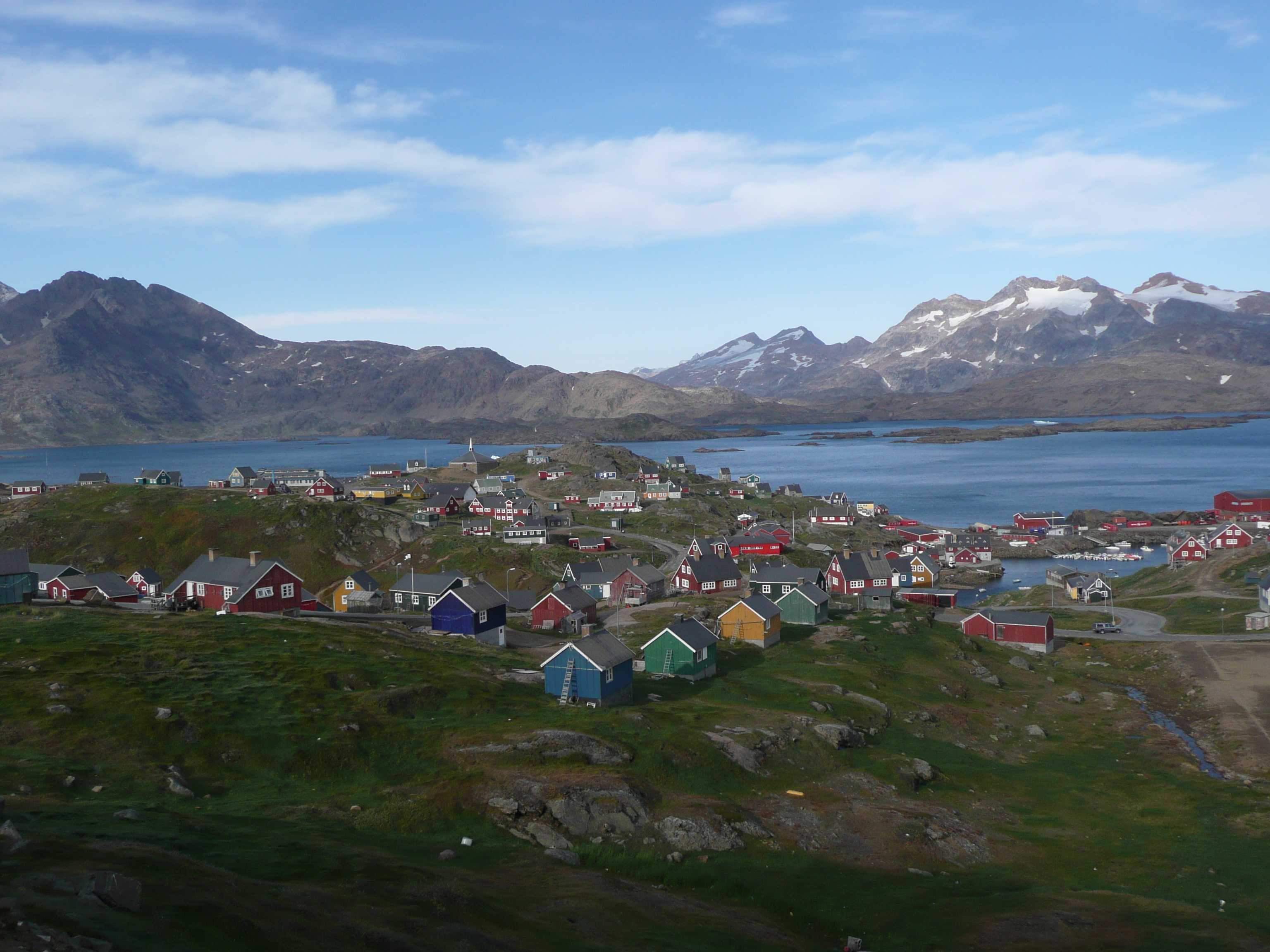
- Tasiilaq in east Greenland

Total population
- 3,000 (2012)

Regions with significant populations
- Iivi Nunaa (Eastern Greenland)

Languages
- Iivi oraasia, Inuttut (Kalaallisut), Danish

Religion
- Inuit beliefs, Evangelical Lutheran

Related ethnic groups
- Other Eskimoan and Indigenous peoples of the Americas

Iivit or Tunumiit are Indigenous Greenlandic Inuit from Iivi Nunaa, Tunu in the area of Kangikajik and Ammassalik, the eastern part of Inuit Nunaat (East Greenland). The Iivit now live mainly in Tasiilaq and Ittoqqortoormiit and are a part of the Arctic people known collectively as the Inuit. The singular for Iivit is Iik or for Tunumiit version it is Tunumiu.

Besides the Iivit, who live in the eastern portion of Inuit Nunaat in the jurisdiction of Kalaallit Nunaat (Greenland), Avanersuarmiut (Northern) and Kitaamiut (Western) Greenland Inuit are called Inuit, Inivit or Inivi (Kalaallit) and Inughuit, respectively. About 80% to 88% of Greenland's population, or approximately 44,000 to 50,000 people, identify as being Indigenous Inuit.

== Language ==
The Tunumiit language, also called Iivi, Iivi oraasia, or East Greenlandic, is generally categorised as a dialect of Greenlandic, the official language of Greenland, but, having evolved over several centuries in isolation, verges on being a distinct language.

== Region ==
Iivit or Tunumiit or the Eastern Inuit, live primarily in the Ammassalik region, the area with the mildest climate in King Christian IX Land. Hunters can hunt marine mammals from kayaks throughout the year.

Ittoqqortoormiit was the settlement founded in 1925 by Ejnar Mikkelsen in Scoresby Sound. 80 Inuit settlers—70 persons from Tasiilaq and four families from western Greenland—were brought there by ship. The area has vestiges of former habitation, but it had been uninhabited for about a century at the time of the foundation of the new settlement.

There were two other Eastern Greenland groups in the long coast between Nunap Isua (Cape Farewell) to King Frederick VIII Land, the Northeast in Kangerlussuaq Fjord and adjacent areas up to Clavering Island, north of the Iivit, and the Southeast-Greenland Inuit in the King Frederick VI Coast to the south, but these are now extinct.

== Art ==
An angakkuq or spirit healer named Mitsivarniannga from Ammassalik Island created a tupilaq "evil spirit object," for a visiting European in 1905. When no harm befell him for creating and showing this object to an outsider, others began making tupilait, which evolved into a popular art form. Residents also carved Ammassalik wooden maps, that traced the Eastern Greenlandic coastline. Customary art-making practices thrive on Ammassalik Island.

== See also ==
- List of Greenlandic Inuit
- Demographics of Greenland
- History of Greenland
- Ittoqqortoormiit
