= West Greenlandic Pidgin =

Extinct Greenlandic-based contact language

- Native to: Greenland
- Era: 17th–19th century
- Language family: Kalaallisut-based pidgin

Language codes
- ISO 639-3: None (mis)
- Glottolog: west2864
- IETF: crp-GL

West Greenlandic Pidgin is an extinct Greenlandic-based contact language once used between the Inuit of Greenland and European traders. The vocabulary is mostly Greenlandic. Although words from Germanic languages were incorporated over the course of contact with Europeans, most of the words that are not Inuit came from other local trade languages. West Greenlandic Pidgin has a vastly simplified grammar, and sounds that were unfamiliar to Northern Europeans, such as r and q, were lost. For example, orsoq 'blubber' became oksok 'bacon'. However, other sounds have since been lost from Greenlandic, such as sh (merged into s in modern Greenlandic) and consonant clusters: nigsik has become nieksik 'hook', but in modern Greenlandic it is nissik.
