= List of Greenlandic Inuit =

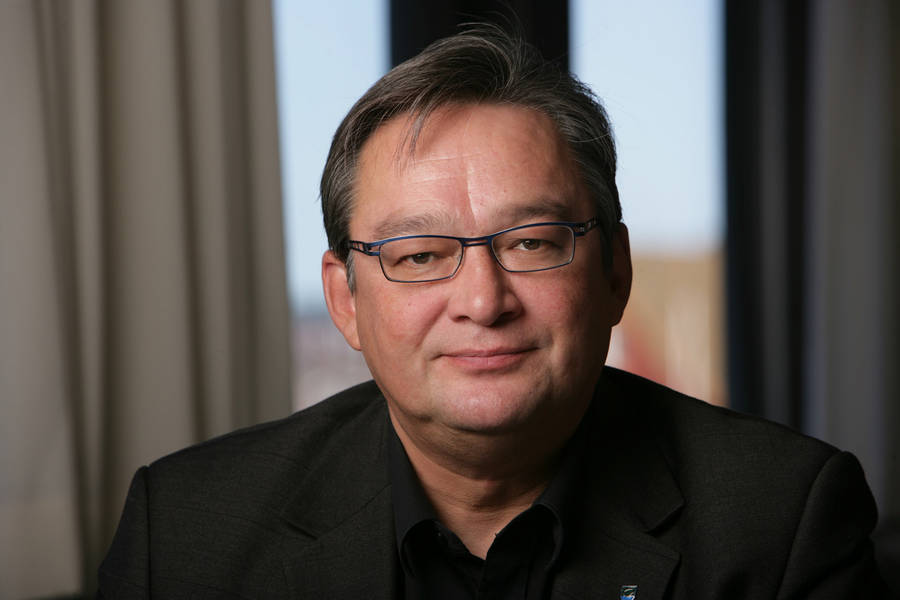
Kuupik Kleist, prime minister of Greenland

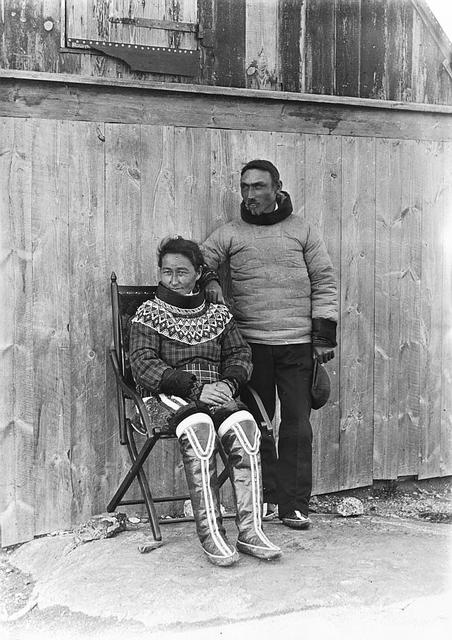
Henrik and Malene Lund, 1911

This is a partial list of Greenlandic Inuit. The Arctic and subarctic dwelling Inuit (formerly referred to as Eskimo) are a group of culturally similar Indigenous peoples.

- Arnarsaq, translator, interpreter and missionary
- Arnarulunnguaq (1896–1933), native Greenlandic woman who accompanied Knud Rasmussen on his Fifth Thule Expedition
- Aron of Kangeq, hunter, painter, and oral historian
- Hans Hendrik, Arctic traveller and interpreter
- Kuupik Kleist, Prime Minister of Greenland
- Henrik Lund, lyricist, painter and priest
- Lena Pedersen, Canadian politician, born in Greenland
- Bishop Sofie Petersen (b. 1955), Lutheran Bishop of Greenland
- Minik Wallace (ca. 1890–1918), boy treated as living exhibit
- Karla Jessen Williamson, activist, educator and researcher

== See also ==
- List of Inuit
