= Maupuk =

Inuit seal hunting technique

Maupuk is a seal hunting technique used by the Inuit (formerly known as Eskimo). They assign dogs to search for seal breathing holes and wait for the seals to emerge.
