= West Greenlandic =

Main dialect of the Greenlandic language

- Kalaallisut, Kitaamiusut, Kitaamiutut
- Native to: West Greenland; Denmark
- Ethnicity: Kalaallit
- Native speakers: (44,000–52,000 cited 1995)
- Language family: Eskaleut: Eskimo; Inuit; Greenlandic; West Greenlandic
- Early forms: Proto-Eskimo–Aleut: Proto-Eskimo; Proto-Inuit

Language codes
- ISO 639-3: –
- Glottolog: kala1399
- Inuit dialects. West Greenlandic in blue.

- West Greenlandic is classified as Vulnerable by the UNESCO Atlas of the World's Languages in Danger

Kalaallisut (lit. 'like the Kalaallit'), also known as West Greenlandic (kitaamiusut or kitaamiutut; Danish: vestgrønlandsk), is the primary and official language of Greenland. It is spoken by the majority of the inhabitants of Greenland, as well as by thousands of Greenlandic Inuit in Denmark proper (in total, approximately 50,000 people). It was historically spoken in the southwestern part of Greenland, i.e. the region around Nuuk, as opposed to the related Greenlandic languages in the northwestern and eastern parts of the island. It has been an official language of Greenland since the 18th century, and the sole official language since 2009.

== Classification ==
Kalaallisut is a member of the Inuit–Yupik–Unangan (Eskaleut) language family, which stretches across the Arctic from Siberia to Greenland. It is a member of the Inuit branch of the language family. Kalaallisut is one of three Inuit languages within Greenland, alongside Tunumiisut (East Greenlandic) and Inuktun (North Greenlandic or Polar Inuit). West Greenlandic has the most speakers of the three. The standard form of Greenlandic is based on Kalaallisut as spoken in the central west coast of Greenland. This region includes the capital Nuuk, Sisimiut, and Maniitsoq, some of the most populated cities of Greenland.

=== Dialects of Kalaallisut ===
There are four main dialects of Kalaallisut, spoken in different regions of the west coast. From south to north, they are: Southern, Central, Northern, and Upernavik. Southern Kalaallisut is spoken from Nanortalik to Paamiut. Central Kalaallisut is spoken from Nuuk to Sisimiut. Northern Kalaallisiut is spoken from the Disko Bay communities north to Uummannaq. Upernavik, the northernmost dialect of West Greenlandic, is spoke in the town of Upernavik. North of Upernavik, Tunumiisut is spoken, which not considered part of the West Greenlandic dialect continuum.

== Relationship with Danish ==
Danish remains an important lingua franca in Greenland and is used in many parts of public life, as well as being the main language spoken by Danes in Greenland. This leads to some language contact and code-switching effects with Kalaallisut. Kalaallisut speakers often switch to Danish for loanwords and neologisms, as Kalaallisut's complex morphology makes such words unwieldy. Otherwise, Kalaallisut has mostly stayed unaffected by Danish. Kalaallisut has also had some contact influence on Danish; in Nuuk, there is an emerging dialect of Danish with Kalaallisut-style prosody.

Permanent residents of Greenland are required by law to attempt to learn Greenlandic. Danish is taught as a second language beginning in first grade.

An extinct mixed trade language known as West Greenlandic Pidgin was based on West Greenlandic.

== Phonology ==
=== Consonants ===
West Greenlandic uses around 14 consonants, depending on the subdialect:

	Labial	Alveolar	Palatal	Velar	Uvular
Nasals	m	n		ŋ	(ɴ) (Note: The uvular nasal [ɴ] only occurs in some dialects, as a nasalized form of word-final q.)
Plosives	p	t		k	q
Fricatives	v	s	(ʃ) (Note: /ʃ/ has generally merged with [s], but some central West Greenlandic speakers maintain the distinction.)	ɣ	ʁ
Approximants		l	j		

Geminate (long) consonants are contrastive with short consonants in West Greenlandic.

=== Vowels ===
Ranges of West Greenlandic monophthongs on a vowel chart

	Front	Back
Close	/i/ ⟨i, e⟩	/u/ ⟨u, o⟩
Open	/a/ ⟨a⟩	

Like other Inuit languages, Kalaallisut only has three vowel phonemes: /i/, /u/, and /a/, with long and short versions. This same vowel system is shared with the other Greenlandic languages, Tunumiisut and Inuktun. The vowels are subject to substantial allophony based on the context of the vowel. For instance, /u/ lowers to [o] before uvular sounds, and fronts to [ʉ] between coronal sounds.

Kalaallisut has a single diphthong, [ai], which is only pronounced as a diphthong at the end of a word, and is pronounced as a long [a:] everywhere else. Sequences of up to four vowels are allowed in Kalaallisut (and Tunumiisut), as in the word ikiuiumatuuq ('helpful').

== Grammar ==
Kalaallisut is a polysynthetic language, with words composed of many morphemes, predominantly suffixes. There are more than 400 affixes in active use, with more that are no longer productive. Due to its polysynthetic nature and extensive affixes, whole sentences can be rendered as a single word; Statistics Greenland gives an extreme example of a 153-letter word, which translates into a 49-word English sentence. (Note: Nalunaarasuartaateeranngualioqatigiiffissualioriataallaqqissupilorujussuanngortartuinnakasinngortinniamisaalinnguatsiaraluallaqqooqigaminngamiaasiinngooq, which translates as "there were reports that they apparently – God knows for how many times – once again had considered whatever I, my poor condition despite, still could be considered to be quite adept and resourceful as initiator to put a consortium together for the establishment of a range of small radio stations.")

Kalaallisut marks eight cases on nouns: absolutive, relative, instrumental, allative, locative, ablative, prosecutive, and equative. It marks eight verbal inflections as well.

There is some evidence that the morphosyntactic structure of Kalaallisut has been changing from an ergative–absolutive alignment to a nominative–accusative alignment in recent decades.

== Vocabulary ==
A few examples of words demonstrate some phonological differences between the Greenlandic languages. These include consonant/vowel cluster assimilation, the phonemic realizations of /l/, /s/, and /v/, palatalization of /t/, and other phonemic differences, which are bolded in the table below:

Kalaallisut (West)	Tunumiisut (East)	Inuktun (North)	English
i**pp**a**ss**aq	i**pp**a**ts**aq	i**kp**a**gh**aq	yesterday
il**ua**rtuq	il**iva**rtiq	il**ua**qtaq	correct
n**aa**ja	n**aa**ja	n**au**ja	seagull
qa**rs**uq	qa**rt**iq	qa**rh**uq	arrow
i**s**i	i**l**i	i**h**i	eye
Kalaa**llis**ut	Kalaa**ttis**it	Kalaa**llih**ut	Greenlandic
