= Kalaallit =

Greenlandic Inuit ethnic group

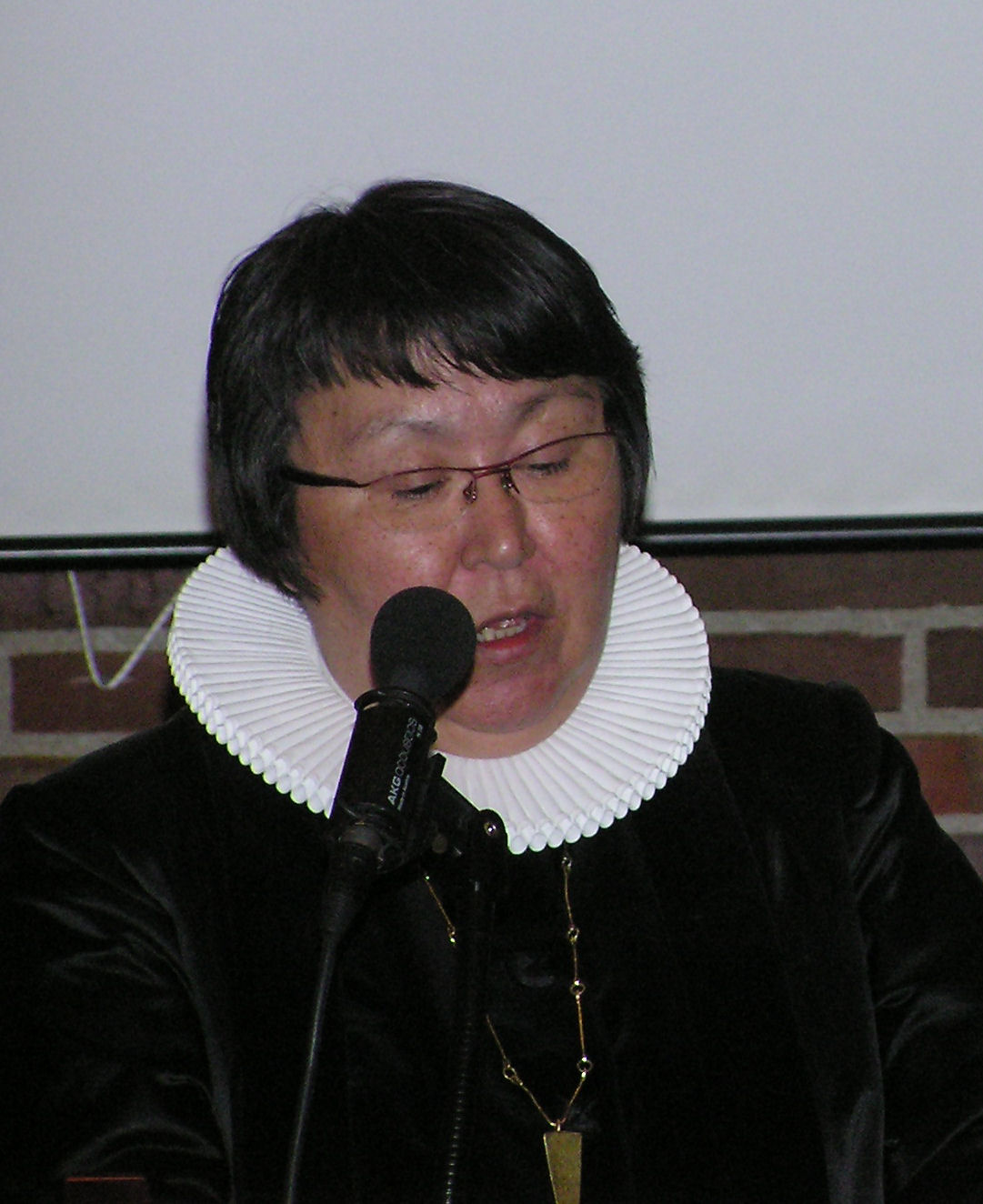
- Bishop Sofie Petersen, first Inuk Lutheran bishop

Total population
- 57,777 (2023 est.)

Regions with significant populations
- Greenland

Languages
- Greenlandic (Kalaallisut) and Danish

Religion
- Inuit religion, Evangelical Lutheranism

Related ethnic groups
- Greenlandic Inuit, Inuit

Kalaallit are an ethnographic group, being the largest such group in Greenland, and are concentrated in the west. It is also a contemporary term in the Greenlandic language for the Greenlandic Inuit of Kalaallit Nunaat (Kalaallisut for Greenland). The Kalaallit (singular: Kalaaleq) are Inuit and form part of the circumpolar peoples of the Arctic. The language spoken by Inuit in Greenland is known as Kalaallisut, and in English as Greenlandic.

== Name ==
Probably adapted from the name Skræling, Kalaallit historically referred specifically to Western Greenlanders.

On the other hand, Northern and Eastern Greenlanders call themselves Inughuit and Tunumiit, respectively. About 80% to 88% of Greenland's population, or approximately 44,000 to 50,000 people identify as being Inuit.

== History ==
Kalaallit are descended from the Thule people but probably not from their predecessors in Greenland, the Dorset culture.

== Regions ==
As 84% of Greenland's landmass is covered by the Greenland ice sheet, Kalaallit live in three regions: Polar, Eastern, and Western. In the 1850s some Canadian Inuit migrated to Greenland and joined the Polar Inuit communities.

The Eastern Inuit, or Tunumiit, live in the area with the mildest climate, a territory called Ammassalik. Hunters can hunt marine mammals from kayaks throughout the year.

The Northeast Greenland Inuit are now extinct. Douglas Clavering (1794–1827) met a group of twelve Inuit, including men, women and children, in Clavering Island in August 1823. There are many remains of former Inuit settlements in different locations of the now desolate area, but the population died out before mid-19th century.

== Art ==
The Kalaallit have a strong artistic tradition based on sewing animal skins and making masks. They are also known for an art form of figures called tupilaq, or "evil spirit object". Traditional art-making practices thrive in the Ammassalik. Sperm whale ivory remains a valued medium for carving.

== See also ==
- List of Greenlandic Inuit
- Demographics of Greenland
- History of Greenland
