= Tunumiisut =

Language of the Tunumiit in East Greenland

- East Greenlandic
- Native to: East Greenland
- Ethnicity: Tunumiit
- Native speakers: (approx. 3,000 cited 1990)
- Language family: Eskaleut: Eskimo; Inuit; Greenlandic; Tunumiisut
- Early forms: Proto-Eskimo–Aleut: Proto-Eskimo; Proto-Inuit

Language codes
- ISO 639-3: –
- Glottolog: tunu1234
- IETF: kl-tunumiit
- Map of the Inuit languages

- East Greenlandic is classified as Definitely Endangered by the UNESCO Atlas of the World's Languages in Danger

Tunumiisut or Dunumiisud (lit. 'like the Tunumiit'; West Greenlandic: Tunumiusut), also known as East Greenlandic (Danish: østgrønlandsk), is an Eskaleut language spoken by the Tunumiit in East Greenland. Researchers vary on whether to treat Tunumiit as a dialect within a Greenlandic dialect continuum, or if its differences are sufficient to consider it a distinct language. The largest town where it is the primary language is Tasiilaq on Ammassalik Island, with the island's name being derived from the West Greenlandic name of the town.

== Classification ==
Tunumiisut is a member of the Inuit–Yupik–Unangan (Eskaleut) language family, which stretches across the Arctic from Siberia to Greenland. It is a member of the Inuit branch of the language family. Tunumiisut is one of three Inuit languages within Greenland, alongside Kalaallisut (West Greenlandic) and Inuktun (North Greenlandic or Polar Inuit).

Tunumiisuit has the second-most speakers of the three, with around 3000 speakers in the 1990 census. This is more than Inuktun (with less than 1000), but far less than the dominant form, Kalaallisut, which has tens of thousands of speakers. There is virtually no literature written in Tunumiisut, though there are orally-spread Tunumiisut folk tales and songs that have been written down as part of academic studies.

The differences between the Greenlandic languages are enough to limit mutual intelligibility, and they are greater than differences found between geographically adjacent dialects in the dialect continuum of Eskaleut languages in Alaska or Canada. Kalaallisut (West Greenlandic) is the prestige dialect, and the standardized form of Greenlandic taught in schools. Speakers of Tunumiisut get some exposure to Kalaallisut from school, church, and media. But Tunumiisut is spoken in an isolated region of the eastern Greenlandic coast, and has substantial phonological differences from the other Greenlandic languages. As such, Tunumiisut speakers generally understand Kalaallisut better than Kalaallisut speakers understand Tunumiisut.

== Phonology ==
=== Relationship to other dialects ===
Compared to Kalaallisut, Tunumiisut has a smaller phonological inventory. Kalaallisut /l/, /t/, and /ʃ/ are all pronounced either as a voiced alveolar lateral flap [ɺ] (if short) or a long voiced alveolar stop [tː] (if geminate). The most notable difference between Tunumiisut and Kalaallisut lies in the vowels, where /i/ displaces /u/ in some contexts, leading to changes in surrounding consonants as well. Inuktun (North Greenlandic) also shows similar vowel shifts, leading them to be grouped together as "i-dialects" of Greenlandic.

=== Vowels ===
Like the other dialects of Greenlandic, Tunumiisut only has three underlying vowels: /i/, /u/, and /a/, although these vowels have many allophones. For instance, /u/ lowers to [o] before uvular sounds, and fronts to [ʉ] between coronal sounds.

	Front	Back
Close	i iː	u uː
Open	a aː	

==== i-dialect ====
Tunumiisut uses substantially more /i/ vowels than other Greenlandic dialects, replacing /u/ in various contexts, leading it to be called an "i-dialect" of Greenlandic. This has been analyzed as a process of "delayed labialization", with the lip rounding that is a characteristic of the /u/ sound instead shifting to the following consonant. Phonological processes then further differentiate the Tunumiisut words from other dialects. For instance, a consonant between two identical vowels is often deleted, leading to differences like the Tunumiisut word iik ('human being') versus Kalaallisut inuk, where the vowel changing to [i] also causes the intervocalic n to be deleted.

=== Consonants ===
	Labial	Alveolar	Palatal	Velar	Uvular
Nasal	m	n		ŋ	ɴ
Plosive/ Affricate	p	t	(t͡ɕ)	k	q
Fricative	v	s		ɣ	ʁ
Approximant	v	l	j		

The following sounds may also occur as geminated; /pː, tː, kː, qː, sː, mː, nː, ŋː/.

- /v/ may be heard as either [v], [β], [w] or [ɥ].
- /l/ may also be heard as [d] in initial positions.
- Sounds /s, sː/ may also be heard as palatalized sounds [ɕ, t͡ɕ] when in palatal positions.
- Sounds /k/ and /q/ may also have intervocalic allophones as [x, ɣ] and [χ, ʁ].
- Nasals /ŋ, ɴ/ can be heard as nasalized fricatives [ɣ̃, ʁ̃] in various environments.

== Vocabulary ==
The vocabulary of Tunumiisut is substantially different from the other Greenlandic languages, due in part to lexical changes motivated by taboo avoidance. After someone's death, people avoided saying the person's name, and overlap between names and common nouns resulted in approximately 30% of the Greenlandic lexicon being replaced within Tunumiisut.

A few examples demonstrate some phonological differences between the Greenlandic languages on shared words. These include consonant/vowel cluster assimilation, the phonemic realizations of /l/, /s/, and /v/, palatalization of /t/, and other phonemic differences, which are bolded in the table below:

Kalaallisut (West)	Tunumiisut (East)	Inuktun (North)	English
i**pp**a**ss**aq	i**pp**a**ts**aq	i**kp**a**gh**aq	yesterday
il**ua**rtuq	il**iva**rteq	il**ua**qtaq	correct
n**aa**ja	n**aa**ja	n**au**ja	seagull
qa**rs**uq	qa**rt**eq	qa**rh**uq	arrow
i**s**i	i**l**i	i**h**i	eye
Kalaa**llis**ut	Kalaa**ttis**it	Kalaa**llih**ut	Greenlandic
