= Inughuit =

Inuit in Greenland

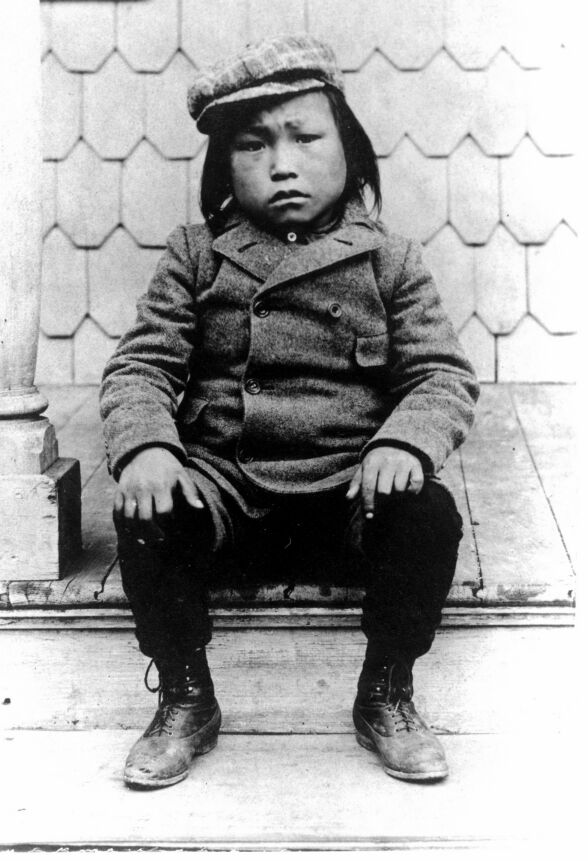
- Minik Wallace, an Inughuaq boy, in New York, 1897

Total population
- 700 (2025)

Regions with significant populations
- Greenland

Languages
- Inuktitut (Inuktun), Greenlandic, Danish

Religion
- Inuit religion, Evangelical Lutheran

The Inughuit (singular: Inughuaq) or Inuhuit are an ethnic subgroup of the Greenlandic Inuit. They are the northernmost group of Inuit and the northernmost people in North America, living in Greenland. Historically called Arctic Highlanders, Cape York Eskimos, Polar Eskimos, or Smith Sound Inuit, they make up about 1% of the population of Greenland.

== Language ==
The Inughuit speak Inuktun, also known as North Greenlandic, Thule Inuit, or Polar Eskimo. It is a dialect of Inuktitut, an Eskimo–Aleut language related to the Greenlandic language spoken elsewhere in Greenland. In Kalaallisut, the official dialect of Greenlandic, Inuktun is called Avanersuarmiutut.

== Population ==
Before 1880, their population was estimated to be between 100 and 200 people. From 1880 to 1930, they were estimated to number 250. In 1980, their estimated population was 700, and it rose to 800 in 2010. In 2025, their population had decreased to an estimated 700.

== History ==
=== Early history ===
The Inughuit are believed to be descended from the Thule people who spread across the North American Arctic around the eleventh century. They used and traded iron from meteorites such as the Cape York meteorite. The earliest discovered Thule settlement is found in modern-day Uummannaq (Dundas). From the 11th to 16th century, the peoples of the region had extensive trading contacts with other Inuit from western and southern Greenland along with Ellesmere Island. Around the 17th century, climate change cooled the northwest areas of Greenland, which cut off the Inughuit from other Inuit and regions.

It was during this time that the Inughuit developed their unique language, culture, and fashion—all of which differ significantly from other Inuit. Around this period, the Inughuit also lost the knowledge to build kayaks or umiaks, which further restricted travel and contact with other communities.

=== Modern history ===
The Inughuit were first contacted by Europeans in 1818, when John Ross led an expedition into their territory. Ross dubbed them "Arctic Highlanders". They are believed to have previously lived in total isolation, to the point of being unaware of other humans, and are cited as one of the rare non-agricultural societies to live without armed feuds or warfare, a state that continued after contact. Erik Holtved, a Dane, was the first university-trained ethnologist to study the Inughuit.

During the mid-19th century, Inuit from Baffin visited and lived with the Inughuit. The Baffin Inuit reintroduced some technologies lost to the Inughuit such as boats, leisters, and bows and arrows. The Inughuit in turn taught the Baffin Inuit a more advanced form of sled technology. American and European explorers in the 19th and early-20th centuries had extensive contacts with the Inughuit. Explorers Robert Peary and Frederick Cook both had Inughuit in their teams acting as guides. However, more sustained contact with outsiders changed many aspects of Inughuit life by creating a dependence on trade goods and introducing new diseases.

Greenlandic anthropologist and explorer Knud Rasmussen established a trading post in Uummannaq (Dundas) in 1910. He also worked to modernize Inughuit society by establishing a governing hunter's council for the Inughuit in 1927. It was during this period that Christian missionaries arrived in the region to evangelize. As a consequence of the relative isolation of the Inughuit, the Inughuit remained absent from growing Greenlandic Inuit nationalism and the nation-building process sweeping the Inuit of western and southern Greenland. The subsequent Cold War era had substantial effects on the Inughuit. In the 1950s, the United States established Thule Air Base close to Uummannaq (Dundas). This forced many Inughuit to move over 116 kilometres (72 mi) north towards Qaanaaq, which proved disastrous to the cultural and social life of the Inughuit.

== Settlements ==
Inughuit people live north of the Arctic Circle on the northwest coast of Greenland in Avannaa, between 75-80° N and 58–73° W. The northernmost well-known settlement was at the village of Etah (at 78° 19' N), but it was abandoned due to the extremely harsh conditions there. Several settlements further north up to 80° N existed in Inglefield Land and Washington Land, but all, alongside Etah, were abandoned by the late 20th century. The northernmost constant settlement is now Siorapaluk (Hiurapaluk).

Uummannaq, also known as "Dundas" or "Thule" to Europeans, was the chief settlement of the Inughuit until 1953 when it was displaced by the United States' Thule Air Base, with its residents relocated to Qaanaaq. Established in 1953, Qaanaaq is the largest Inughuit settlement.

== Culture ==
The Inughuit traditionally engaged in hunting and fishing. Animals often hunted included caribou, muskox, Arctic hares, Arctic foxes, little auks, thick-billed murre and polar bears. However, they also hunted seagulls, ringed seals, beluga whales, narwhals, walruses, and various species of fish.

The Inughuit historically practiced their native Inuit religion. Shamans, called angakkoq by the Inughuit, acted as healers and were believed to have the ability to wield spiritual powers to counter the supernatural hazards posed by nature. Amulets in particular were popular among the Inughuit and were believed to protect the wearer from misfortune and danger.

== See also ==
- 1968 Thule Air Base B-52 crash
