= Inuktun =

Inuit language of northwestern Greenland

- Polar Inuit
- avanersuarmiutut
- Native to: Greenland; Kingdom of Denmark
- Region: Avanersuaq
- Ethnicity: Inughuit
- Native speakers: (800–1,000 cited 1995)
- Language family: Eskaleut: Eskimo; Inuit; (variously classified as Inuktitut, Inuvialuktun or Inuinnaqtun); Inuktun
- Early forms: Proto-Eskimo–Aleut: Proto-Eskimo; Proto-Inuit

Official status
- Official language in: Greenland

Language codes
- ISO 639-3: –
- Glottolog: pola1254 Polar Eskimo
- Inuit dialects. Inuktun is the brown area ("Avanersuaq") in the northwest of Greenland.

- North Greenlandic is classified as Definitely Endangered by the UNESCO Atlas of the World's Languages in Danger.

Inuktun (English: Polar Inuit, Greenlandic: avanersuarmiutut, Danish: nordgrønlandsk, polarinuitisk, thulesproget) is the language of approximately 1,000 Indigenous Inughuit (Polar Inuit), inhabiting the world's northernmost settlements in Qaanaaq and the surrounding villages in northwestern Greenland.

== Geographic distribution ==
Apart from the town of Qaanaaq, Inuktun is also spoken in the villages of (Inuktun names in brackets) Siorapaluk (Hiurapaluk), Qeqertat (Qikiqtat), and Savissivik (Havighivik).

== Classification ==
The language is an Eskimo–Aleut language and dialectologically it is in between the Greenlandic language (Kalaallisut) and the Canadian Inuktitut, Inuvialuktun or Inuinnaqtun. The language differs from Kalaallisut by some phonological, grammatical and lexical differences.

== History ==
The Polar Inuit were the last to cross from Canada into Greenland and they may have arrived as late as in the 18th century. The language was first described by the explorers Knud Rasmussen and Peter Freuchen who travelled through northern Greenland in the early 20th century and established a trading post in 1910 at Dundas (Uummannaq) near Pituffik.

== Current situation ==
Inuktun does not have its own orthography and is not taught in schools. However, most of the inhabitants of Qaanaaq and the surrounding villages use Inuktun in their everyday communication.

All speakers of Inuktun also speak Standard Greenlandic. Many also speak Danish, and some speak English as well.

== Phonology and orthography ==
There is no official way to transcribe Inuktun. This article uses the orthography of Michael Fortescue, which deliberately reflects the close connection between Inuktun and Inuktitut.

=== Vowels ===
The vowels are the same as in other Inuit dialects: /i/, /u/ and /a/.

	Front	Central	Back
Close	i iː		u uː
Mid	(e~ə eː~əː) (Note: Like in West Greenlandic /i/, /u/ and /a/ become [e~ə], [o] and [ɑ] respectively before uvular consonants. However, unlike in West Greenlandic, [e~ə] and [o] aren't written with ⟨e⟩ and ⟨o⟩. Instead they are written with ⟨i⟩ and ⟨u⟩ like in Inuktitut)		(o oː)
Open	a aː		(ɑ ɑː)

There are two diphthongs: /ai/ and /au/, which have been assimilated in West Greenlandic to /aa/ (except for final /ai/).

=== Consonants ===
The most notable phonological difference from West Greenlandic is the debuccalization of West Greenlandic /s/ to /h/ (often pronounced [ç]) except for geminate [sː] (from earlier /ss/ or /vs/). Inuktun also allows more consonant clusters than Kalaallisut, namely ones with initial /k/, /ŋ/, /ɣ/, /q/ or /ʁ/. Older or conservative speakers also still have clusters with initial /p/, /m/ or /v/. Younger speakers have gone further in reducing old clusters, with also /k/, /ŋ/ and /ɣ/ being assimilated to the following consonant.

The digraphs ⟨gh⟩ and ⟨rh⟩ (from earlier /ɣs/ and /ʁs/, cognates with West Greenlandic ⟨ss⟩ and ⟨rs⟩) are pronounced like West Greenlandic velar and uvular fricatives -gg- /xː/ and -rr- /χː/ respectively.

Consonants of Inuktun
		Labial	Alveolar	Palatal	Velar	Uvular	Glottal
Nasal	plain	m ⟨m⟩	n ⟨n⟩, ⟨-t⟩ (Note: in word-final position the stops /t/, /k/ and /q/ become nasals [n], [ŋ] and [ɴ]. Fortescue chose not to show this in his orthography (except for the name of the dialect itself, Inuktun, which corresponds to West Greenlandic Inuttut "speaking like a person").)		ŋ ⟨ng⟩, ⟨-k⟩	(ɴ ⟨-q⟩)	
Nasal	geminated	mː ⟨mm⟩	nː ⟨nn⟩		ŋː ⟨nng⟩	ɴː ⟨rng⟩	
Plosive	plain	p ⟨p⟩	t ⟨t⟩		k ⟨k⟩	q ⟨q⟩	ʔ (Note: the non-nasal voiced geminates in Inuktun (gg, vv, ll, rr) are pronounced with a glottal stop + single voiced consonant ([ʔɣ], [ʔv], [ʔɾ], [ʔʁ]), unlike in Kalaallisut where they have all become devoiced long consonants ([xː], [fː], [ɬː], [χː]).)
Plosive	geminated	pː ⟨pp⟩	tː ⟨tt⟩		kː ⟨kk⟩	qː ⟨qq⟩	
Affricate	plain		(t͡s ⟨t⟩) (Note: like in West Greenlandic short [t͡s] is in complementary distribution with short [t], with the former appearing before /i/ and the latter elsewhere; both are written ⟨t⟩ and could be analysed as belonging to the same phoneme /t/. Before /i/, long [tt͡s] occurs while long [tt] doesn't, so long [tt͡s] before /i/ could be analysed as long /tt/. However, before /a/ and /u/, both long [tt͡s] and long [tt] occur. Long [tt͡s] is always written ⟨ts⟩.)				
Affricate	geminated		tːs ⟨ts⟩				
Fricative	plain	v ⟨v⟩ (Note: /v/ may be bilabial [β] for older speakers)	s ⟨s⟩	(ç ⟨h⟩) (Note: the phoneme /h/ has two allophones for most speakers, an ordinary 'glottal' [h] and a palatal sound, [ç], which can be written 'hj'. This latter allophone, which is more frequent among older speakers, occurs regularly for most middle generation speakers between /a/ and /u/ (as in ahu), /u/ and /u/ (as in puqtuhuq) and /a/ and /a/ (as in ahaihuq), but also in the few (but common) other words containing the sequence huuq or huur, as in the ending of the word takihuuq ("long"). The only major exception concerns the indicative/participle endings (huq, etc.), which does not usually have the allophone [ç] even after /a/ or /u/. Since the variation is predictable, Fortescue chose to use h for both sounds. For many if not most middle generation and younger speakers, however, a reanalysis of some of the forms with huuq has taken place (at least word-initially or after /a/) so huuq ("why") and pualahuuq ("fat") are now pronounced hiuq and pualahiuq, with a clear sequence of two syllables.)	ɣ ⟨g⟩	ʁ ⟨r⟩	h ⟨h⟩
Fricative	geminated		sː ⟨ss⟩		xː ⟨gh⟩	χː ⟨rh⟩	
Approximant			(l ⟨l⟩) (Note: the phoneme /l/ is pronounced as a flap [ɾ] as in most of northwest and East dialects of Greenlandic, which may sound more like a "d" to native English speakers.)	j ⟨j⟩			
Flap			ɾ ⟨l⟩				

=== Comparison with West Greenlandic ===
Pronunciation
Inuktun	West Greenlandic
a [a], [ɑ] (Note: before uvular consonants)
aa [aː], [ɑː]
ai [ai]	aa [aː], [ɑː] ai [ai] (Note: word-finally)
au [au]	aa [aː], [ɑː]
g [ɣ]
gg [ʔɣ]	gg [xː~çː]
gh [xː]	ss [sː]
gl [ɣɾ]	ll [ɬː]
h [h], [ç] (see above)	s [s] (Note: also [ʃ] in some dialects)
i [i], [e~ə]	i [i] e [e~ə]
ii [iː], [eː~əː]	ii [iː] ee [eː~əː]
j [j]
k [k], [ŋ]	k [k]
kp [kp~xp] / [pː] (Note: for younger speakers)	pp [pː]
kt [kt~xt] / [tː]	tt [tː]
l [ɾ]	l [l]
ll [ʔɾ]	ll [ɬː]
m [m]
n [n]
ng [ŋ]
ngm [ŋm] / [mː]	mm [mː]
ngn [ŋn] / [nː]	nn [nː]
p [p]
q [q], [ɴ]	q [q]
qp [qp~χp]	rp [pː]
qt [qt~χt], [qt͡s~χt͡s] (Note: before i)	rt [tː], [tt͡s] (Note: before i or e)
r [ʁ]
rl [ʁɾ]	rl [ɬː]
rm [ʁm]	rm [mː]
rn [ʁn]	rn [ɴ]
rng [ɴː]
rh [χː]	rs [sː]
rv [ʁv] (may be [ʁβ] for older speakers)	rf [fː]
s [s]
ss [sː]
t [t], [t͡s]	t [t], [t͡s]
ts [tt͡s]
u [u], [o]	u [u] o [o]
uu [uː], [oː]	uu [uː] oo [oː]
v [v] (may be [β] for older speakers)	v [v]
vv [ʔv] (may be [ʔβ] for older speakers)	ff [fː]
