= Greenlandic krone =

Planned currency for Greenland which was abandoned in 2009

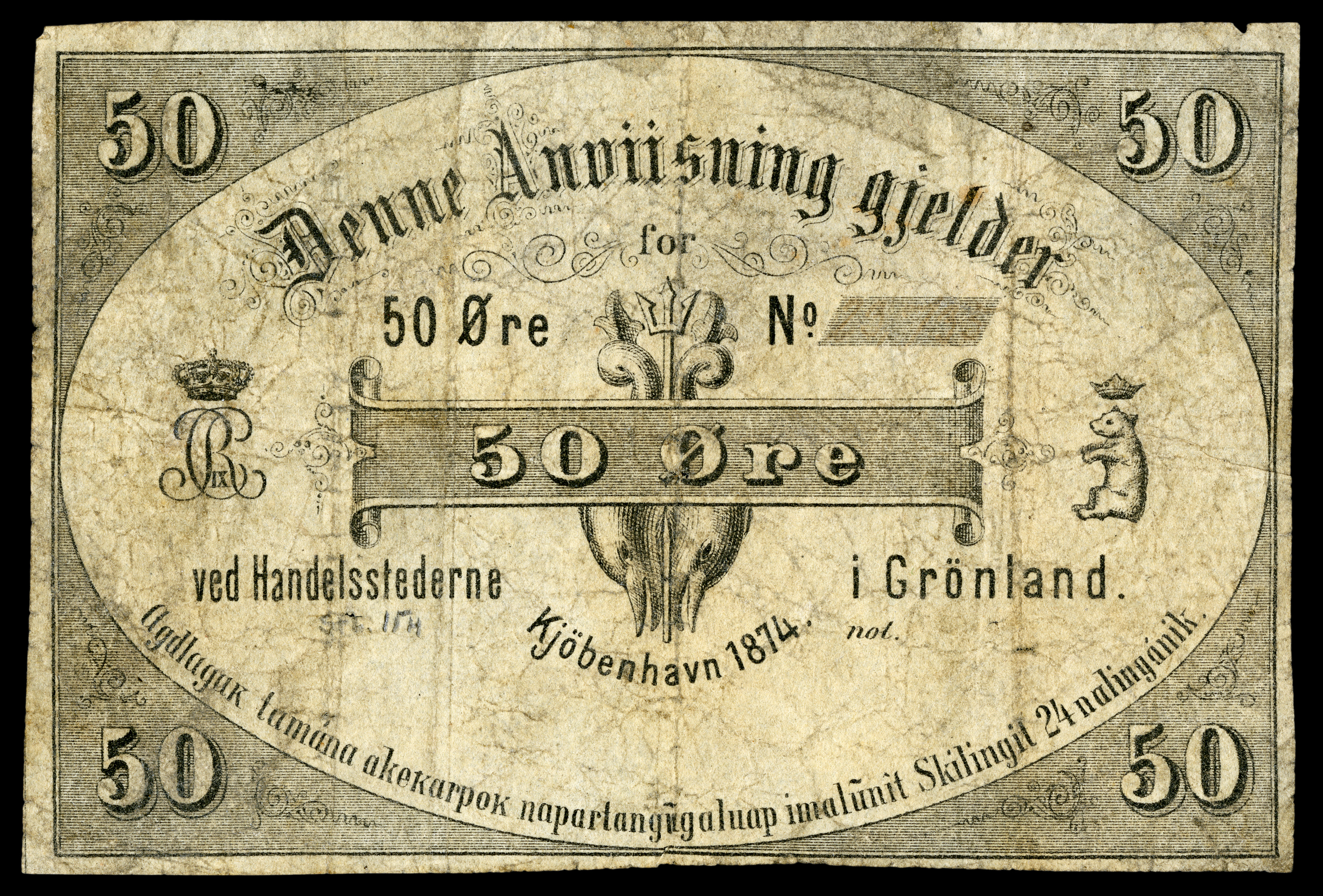
Greenland, 50 Øre (1874), first year of issue for the Greenlandic krone. The uniface note (valued at half a krone) was issued in Denmark for use in Greenland. The note depicts the royal monogram of Christian IX of Denmark on the left and a small crowned polar bear on the right.

The Greenlandic krone (Greenlandic: koruuni, Danish: grønlandsk krone) was a planned currency for Greenland, plans of which were abandoned in 2009. The same name is often used for currency issued during Greenland's time as a Danish colony. The name krone is derived from the Danish krone, introduced in an 1873 currency reform that replaced the Danish mark and skilling.

Currently, the Danish krone circulates in Greenland. The Greenlandic krone was not intended to be an independent currency but a version of the Danish krone. Consequently, it was not intended to have its own ISO 4217 currency code, but to use the same ISO 4217 code as the Danish krone, which is DKK. Even if the currency had been adopted, the (regular) Danish krone would have continued to circulate separately.

== History ==
As in Denmark, the krone replaced the rigsdaler in 1874 at a rate of 2 kroner = 1 rigsdaler. All issues of the krone in Greenland have been equivalent in value to the Danish krone. During the last part of the 19th century, while still a Danish colony, several mining companies operating in Greenland issued their own currencies. Distinct zinc currency was also introduced in the newly founded colony of Amassalik. Between 1926 and 1964, the Danish government's trade monopoly, Kongelig Grønlandske Handel (KGH; known in English as 'Royal Greenlandic Trade'), introduced a series of distinct coins for use in Greenland. In 1944, the colonial administrations in both North Greenland and South Greenland jointly issued a 5-kroner coin, using a similar design as the then-circulating 1-krone piece but produced at the U.S. Mint in Philadelphia. Although the Colony of Greenland, which was only formed in 1950, was incorporated into the Kingdom of Denmark by the 1953 change to the Danish constitution, the administration in the new County of Greenland continued to issue its own banknotes until 1968.

In 2006, the government of Denmark and the home rule government in Greenland announced that an agreement had been reached to produce a distinct Greenlandic version of the Danish krone (DKK) banknotes, a similar relationship as between the Faroese króna and the Danish krone. A bill to this effect was passed unanimously by the Folketinget (Parliament of Denmark) in May 2007. The bill specifies the nature of the new issue:

One currency and monetary policy exists for the entire realm. The responsibility herefor rests with Danmarks Nationalbank. Danmarks Nationalbank is consequently the central bank of the entire realm and the Danish krone is the currency for the entire realm. This law makes no change to this situation. Regardless of the application of distinct Greenlandic notes, the same currency is applied as in the rest of Denmark. Thus, the Greenlandic notes are a particular form of the Danish krone currency, and are to be understood as [standard] national bank notes with Greenlandic text.

— Parliament of Denmark, law no. 42 of the 2006-07 session, official comments, http://www.ft.dk/Samling/20061/lovforslag/L42/som_fremsat.htm

However, in a vote in mid-October 2009, Greenland decided not to introduce its own notes for now.

== Coins ==
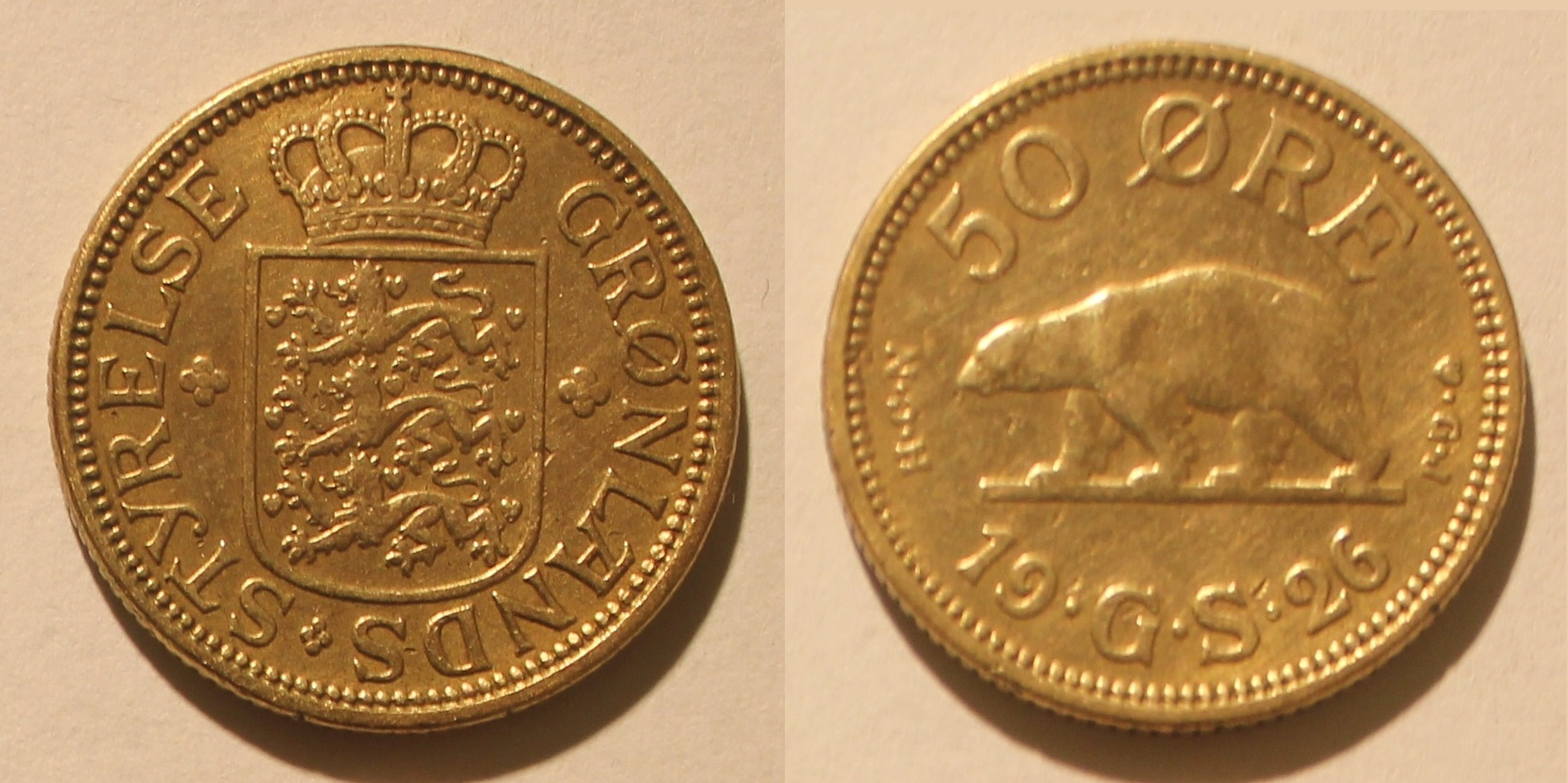
Greenlandic aluminium-bronze 50 øre coin from 1926. These were used throughout both North Greenland and South Greenland.

In 1926, cupronickel 25 øre and aluminium-bronze 50 øre and 1 krone were issued. The coins were the same size and composition as the corresponding Danish coins. However, the 25 øre was not holed, although some were withdrawn from circulation, holed and then reissued.

In 1944 with the occupation of Greenland by the United States during World War II, a 5 kroner coin was minted for the American troops. Very similar to the previous coinage in showing a polar bear on the obverse, 100,000 coins in brass were struck at the Philadelphia Mint. Their exchange value was equal to one U.S. dollar.

A second issue of the aluminium-bronze 1 krone coin, with a revised design, was made in 1957 followed by cupronickel versions in 1960 and 1964.

A related foreign issue is the 2-kroner coin that Denmark minted in 1953. To commemorate the start of an anti-tuberculosis campaign in Greenland, 200,000 pieces were struck. On the obverse are profiles of King Frederik IX of Denmark and Queen Ingrid. The reverse shows a map of the island with the native name, Kalåtdlit Nunat, above it. The coin is considered part of the Danish krone series of mintages.

== Banknotes ==
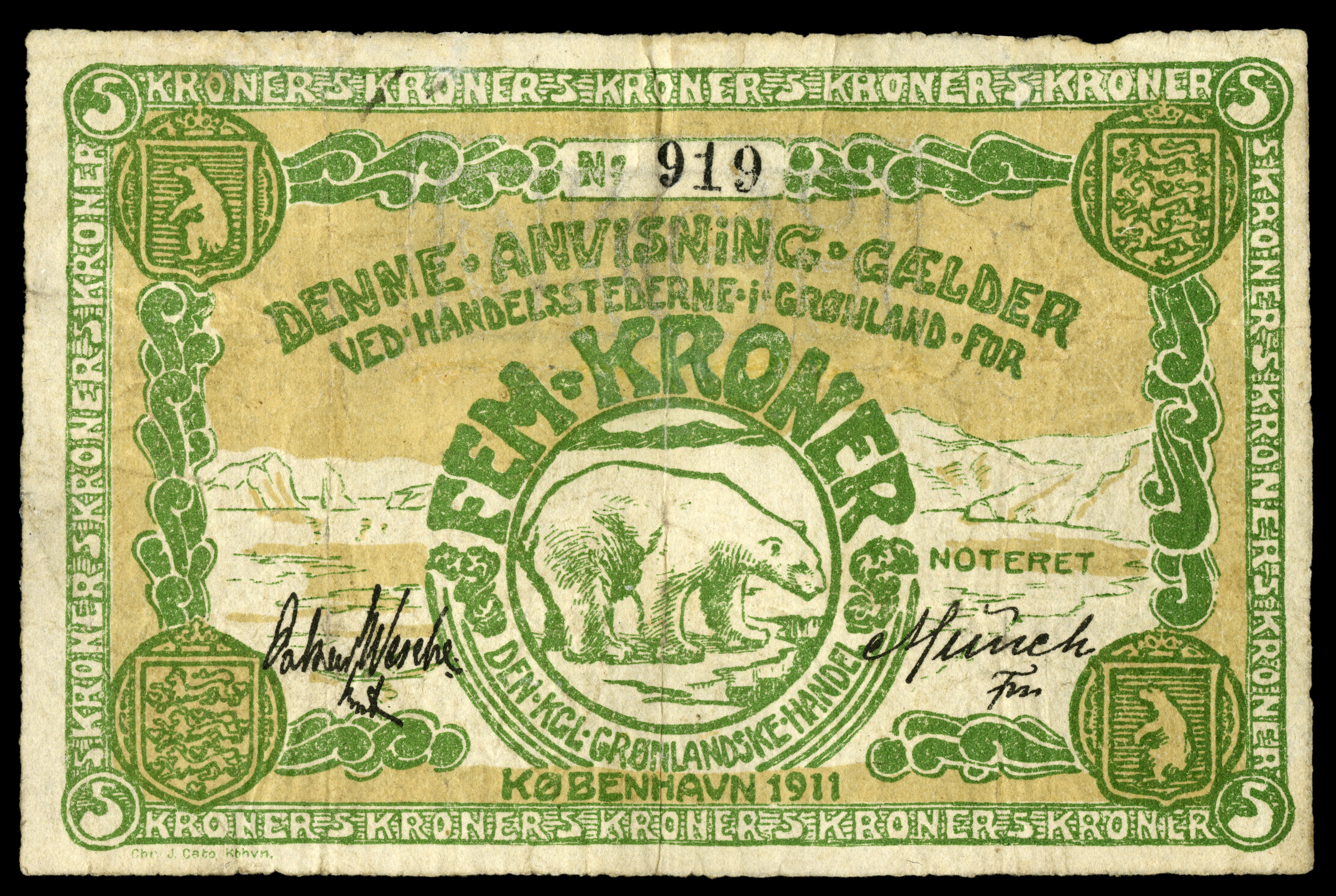
Greenland's 5 Kroner (1911), issued by the Kongelige Grønlandske Handel (KGH), depicting a polar bear

In 1874, Handelsstederne i Grønland issued 50-øre and 1-krone notes, followed by 25-øre notes the next year. In 1887, 5-kroner notes were introduced. The Handelsstederne continued to issue notes until 1905. In 1911, the Kongelige Grønlandske Handel (KGH) began issuing paper money, with notes in denominations of 25 and 50 øre, 1 and 5 kroner.

In 1913, colonial notes (marked Styrelse af Kolonierne i Grønland) were introduced in denominations of 25 and 50 øre, 1 and 5 kroner. From 1926, colonial notes were marked Grønlands Styrelse, the denominations below 5 kroner ceased production and 10- and 50-kroner notes were introduced.

In 1953, the KGH resumed note production with 5-, 10- and 50-kroner notes, whilst credit notes (Kreditsedler) for 100 kroner were also issued. These notes were produced until 1967.

== See also ==
- Economy of Greenland
