= County of Greenland =

Danish county (1953–1979)

Coordinates: 76°N 41°W

County of Greenland Kalaallit Nunaat (Greenlandic) Grønlands Amt (Danish)
- County of Denmark
- 1953–1979
- Flag of County of Greenland Coat of arms

- Mainland Denmark (lime green) and Greenland (dark green) in 1953
- Capital: Godthåb
- Government
- Monarch
  - 1953–1972: Frederik IX
  - 1972–1979: Margrethe II
- Governor
  - 1950–1960: Poul Hugo Lundsteen
  - 1960–1963: Finn C. Nielsen
  - 1963–1973: Niels Otto Christensen
  - 1973–1979: Hans Lassen
- History
  - Established: 5 June 1953
  - home rule: 1 May 1979
| Preceded by | Succeeded by |
| Colony of Greenland | Greenland |
- Today part of: Kingdom of Denmark: Greenland

The County of Greenland (Danish: Grønlands Amt) was an amt (county) of Denmark, all within the Kingdom of Denmark, comprising Greenland and its associated islands, before home rule was granted to Greenland.

== History ==
In June 1953, Greenland's colonial status officially ended with the establishment of the 1953 Danish constitution. When the colonial status ended, Greenland was incorporated administratively into Denmark itself as an amt (county), all within the wider Kingdom of Denmark, which gave Greenlanders full Danish citizenship. Partially as a result, Danish policies toward Greenland changed to a strategy of cultural assimilation. During this period, the Danish government promoted the exclusive use of the Danish language in official matters and required Greenlanders to go to Denmark for their post-secondary education; many Greenlandic children grew up in boarding schools in southern Denmark, often losing their cultural ties to Greenland. The policy eventually backfired by producing a reassertion of Greenlandic cultural identity by the Greenlandic élite, leading to a movement in favour of independence that reached its peak in the 1970s.

Largely due to these developments, a further desire to establish the legality of Greenland's status formed in Denmark, resulting in the Home Rule Act of 1979 following a referendum. This Act detached Greenland administratively from Denmark itself and henceforth gave Greenland limited autonomy as a rigsdel (an autonomous territory) within the Kingdom of Denmark. As a rigsdel, Greenland henceforth had its own legislature, which took control of most internal policies, while the Folketing (the Parliament of Denmark) maintained full control of external policies, security, defence, and natural resources. The law came into effect on 1 May 1979, changing Greenland from being an amt to being a rigsdel (an autonomous territory) within the Kingdom of Denmark.

== See also ==
- Kingdom of Denmark
- North Greenland
- South Greenland
- The unity of the Realm
- List of governors of Greenland
- Faroe Islands
