= Børge Johan Schultz =

Royal Inspector of North Greenland
- In office 1790–1797
- Preceded by: Jens Clausen Wille
- Succeeded by: Claus Bendeke

Personal details
- Born: 24 July 1764 Ringsaker, Denmark-Norway
- Died: 18 August 1826 (aged 62) Østre Toten, Norway
- Occupation: Administrator, lawyer

Børge Johan Schultz (1764-1826) was a Norwegian official who served as Royal Inspector of North Greenland from 1790 to 1797.

Born in the prestegjeld of Ringsaker to a middle-class family, Schultz studied law at the University of Copenhagen, where he graduated in 1788. In 1790, he was appointed as inspector of North Greenland upon the resignation of his predecessor, Jens Clausen Wille, who left the colony due to its disorganized state. During his tenure as inspector, Schultz encountered numerous problems in the colony, including disease and famine caused by English overfishing.

In 1796, he passed a law allowing European settlers and Greenlandic Inuit to marry.

He requested dismissal in 1796, which was granted the following year. He returned to Norway, where he was appointed Vogt of Østre Toten. He died in 1826, at the age of 62.

== See also ==
- List of inspectors of Greenland
