= Ole Bendixen =

Royal Inspector of South Greenland
- In office 1903–1914
- Preceded by: Oscar Peter Cornelius Koch
- Succeeded by: Oluf Hastrup

Personal details
- Born: 7 December 1869 Søften Sogn, Favrskov Municipality, Denmark
- Died: 24 June 1958 (aged 88) Ordrup Sogn, Gentofte Municipality, Denmark
- Occupation: Merchant, explorer, author, administrator

Ole Bendixen (1869–1958) was a Danish explorer, merchant, and author who served as Royal Inspector of South Greenland from 1903 to 1914.

== Career ==
Bendixen was active in Greenland from the early 1890s, and rose through the ranks of the Royal Greenland Trading Company, which had administrated Greenland from the 18th century. He was appointed inspector (the highest post in the colony) of the south in 1903, and held the post for 11 years. Upon his retirement as inspector, he was awarded the Order of Vasa.

He led several expeditions in the Arctic in the 1910s, and was the author of several non-fiction books about Greenland.

== See also ==
- List of inspectors of Greenland
