= Christian Søren Marcus Olrik =

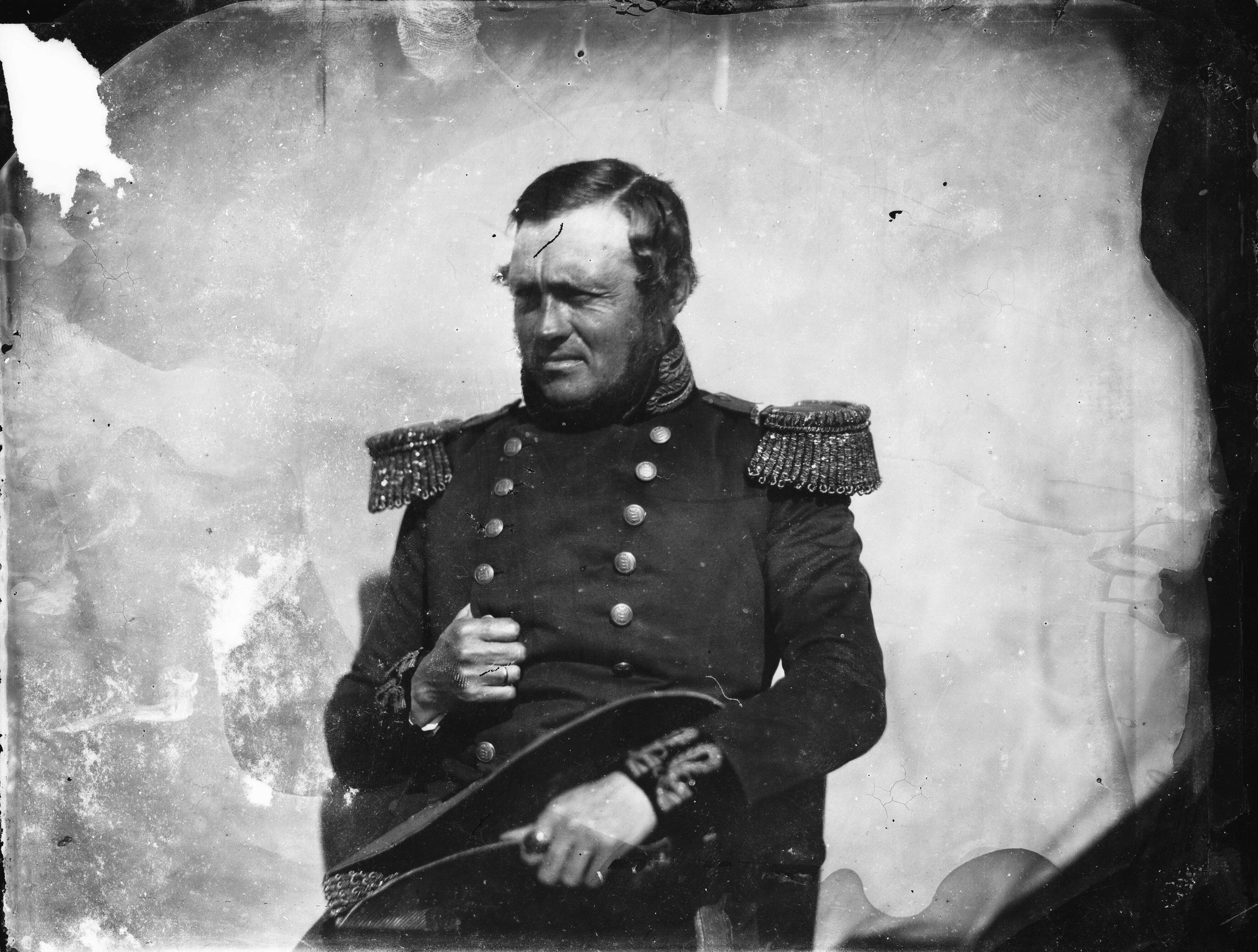

Royal Inspector of North Greenland
- In office 1846–1866
- Preceded by: Nicolai Zimmer
- Succeeded by: Carl August Ferdinand Bolbroe

Personal details
- Born: 13 October 1815 Julianehåb, South Greenland
- Died: 14 December 1870 (aged 55) Frederiksberg, Denmark
- Spouse(s): Sophie Agnes Møller; Margrethe Elisabeth Møller
- Occupation: Zoologist, botanist, merchant, administrator

Christian Søren Marcus Olrik (13 October 1815 - 14 December 1870) was a Danish Greenlander professor, zoologist, botanist, and Royal Inspector of North Greenland.

== Biography ==
Olrik was born at Julianehåb, Greenland. He was the son of Vilhelm Mathias Olrik (1780-1833) and Lea Kirstine Geraae (1794-1828). He became a student at Borgerdydskolen in Copenhagen in 1833. He began his teaching career for the next nine years. He returned to Greenland and was appointed Inspector of the North in 1846 after his brother-in-law, Hans Peter Christian Møller (1810-45) had died in office.

During his tenure as inspector he encouraged the self-sufficiency of the Greenlandic economy and was a member of the Greenland Trade Commission. He held on to the position for 20 years before returning again to Copenhagen. He was a popular contact for scientific expeditions to Greenland, as he was a trained and experienced botanist.

Olrik was elected to the American Philosophical Society in 1856.

== Legacy ==
Olrik Fjord in NW Greenland was named after him. Three animal species are named after Olrik; a poacher, a tapeworm, and a leech.

== Personal life ==
He was married in 1846 to Sophie Møller (1820-1862). He was married in 1863 with Margrethe Elisabeth Møller (1812-1902) sister of his 1st wife.

== See also ==
- List of inspectors of Greenland
