= Alvania scrobiculata =

Scientific classification
- Kingdom: Animalia
- Phylum: Mollusca
- Class: Gastropoda
- Subclass: Caenogastropoda
- Order: Littorinimorpha
- Superfamily: Rissooidea
- Family: Rissoidae
- Genus: Alvania
- Species: A. scrobiculata

Binomial name
- Alvania scrobiculata (Møller, 1842)

Synonyms
- Frigidoalvania scrobiculata (Møller, 1842); Rissoa scrobiculata Møller, 1842 ·

Species of gastropod

Alvania scrobiculata is a species of small sea snail, marine gastropod mollusk or micromollusk in the family Rissoidae.

== Distribution ==
This marine species occurs in Baffin Bay, Canada; also off Greenland and Iceland.

== Description ==
The maximum recorded shell length is 3.4 mm.

== Habitat ==
Minimum recorded depth is 22 m. Maximum recorded depth is 574 m.
