= Ludvig Fasting =

Danish professor, soldier, and explorer (1789–1863)

Royal Inspector of North Greenland
- In office 1828–1843
- Preceded by: Carl Peter Holbøll
- Succeeded by: Hans Peter Christian Møller

Personal details
- Born: 21 June 1789 Skørringe Sogn, Lolland, Denmark
- Died: 24 November 1863 (aged 74) Copenhagen, Denmark
- Occupation: Teacher, administrator, soldier

Ludvig Fasting (1789–1863) was a Danish professor, administrator, soldier, and explorer who served as Inspector of North Greenland between 1828 and 1843.

During his 15-year tenure as Inspector of North Greenland he campaigned for economic and health development within the colony, and attempted to unify the Danes and the Greenlandic Inuit through the use of both Danish and Greenlandic in his dispatches.

In 1843 he resigned due to poor health and returned to mainland Denmark.

His nephew was the esteemed painter Johannes Fasting Wilhjelm.

== See also ==
- List of inspectors of Greenland
