= Nicolai Zimmer =

Inspector of North Greenland from 1845 to 1846

Royal Inspector of North Greenland
- In office 1845–1846
- Preceded by: Hans Peter Christian Møller
- Succeeded by: Christian Søren Marcus Olrik

Personal details
- Born: 25 January 1810 Veggerby, Denmark
- Died: 31 May 1894 (aged 84) Frederiksberg, Denmark
- Occupation: Merchant, administrator

Nicolai Zimmer (1810-1894) was the Danish Inspector of North Greenland from 1845 to 1846. He studied law in Aalborg from 1829, and moved to Greenland in 1842, before being appointed inspector.

His mother Elisabeth was the granddaughter of Frederick Charles, Duke of Schleswig-Holstein-Sonderburg-Plön, through his illegitimate daughter Frederikke. Zimmer's wife Karen was half Greenlandic Inuit.

== See also ==
- List of inspectors of Greenland
