= Carl August Ferdinand Bolbroe =

Danish Royal Inspector of North Greenland

Royal Inspector of North Greenland
- In office 1866–1867
- Preceded by: Christian Søren Marcus Olrik
- Succeeded by: Sophus Theodor Krarup-Smith

Personal details
- Born: November 24, 1833 Egedesminde, North Greenland
- Died: October 28, 1878 (age 44) Christianshåb, Greenland
- Occupation: Administrator

Carl August Ferdinand Bolbroe (November 24, 1833 - October 28, 1878) was the Danish Royal Inspector of North Greenland from 1866 to 1867.

== Biography ==
Bolbroe was born at Egedesminde (now Aasiaat), Greenland. His father, Poul Georg Lauri Bolbroe (1810-1885), was from Bornholm, but worked for a number of years in Greenland. He worked at the Inspectorate Office in Nuuk from 1829, and worked at several trading stations until 1843 when he moved home to Denmark. His mother Maren Elisabeth Bibiane Rasmussen was born in Greenland.

Bolbroe graduated at Copenhagen in 1855. In 1861 he was hired as assistant in Kangersuatsiaq and in 1865 and went to Godhavn (now Nuuk) as a volunteer. In 1866 he was appointed inspector for North Greenland. In 1867 he was succeeded by Sophus Theodor Krarup-Smith (1834-1882) who served until his death in 1882.

== See also ==
- List of inspectors of Greenland
