= Parsissaet =

Local Greenlandic councils

The parsissaet, (sometimes translated as local councils or guardian councils) were a form of local council in Greenland between 1857 and 1911. They were created by the Royal Greenland Trading Department (KGH).

== 1840 Commission ==
In 1840, a government commission investigating the Greenland trade issued a report proposing that the KGH be operated on a non-profit basis, reïnvesting any surplus towards benefiting the native Greenlanders; this was accepted, although the company reserved the right to interest on the government's investment into Greenland. The prices paid for native goods – principally sealskins and whale blubber – were raised and expenditures on education (two teacher training colleges and scholarships for study in Denmark) and health care (an additional doctor) increased.

== Parsissaet established ==
The parsissaet, headed by the local Lutheran priest and KGH factor and composed of appointed Greenlanders, were established experimentally in 1857 and permanently in 1861. The councils were granted control of one-fifth of the area's profits and in exchange took over poor relief, which had previously been the responsibility of the KGH. Profits left unspent by the parsissaet were divided among the local Inuit hunters on the basis of their catch.

== Jurisdiction ==
The parsissaet also had jurisdiction over local civil suits and misdemeanors among Greenlanders, although felonies were simply investigated and left for the royal governor to decide. The only written laws were that the following actions were illegal:

1. Unauthorized use of property belonging to others, such as using their tools without permission; damaging such tools; keeping other hunters' catches without payment; taking possession of driftwood which another person had already dragged above the high water mark;

2. Simple theft and evident disobedience to the authorities;

3. Capital crimes such as manslaughter and other serious offenses such as the concealment of births.

In other cases, the law was customary, following Inuit traditions or decisions made by the administrators to address some new problem (for instance, the 1890 banning of Greenlandic women from boarding visiting ships after severe venereal disease outbreaks).

== Parsissaet dissolved ==
The parsissaet were dissolved in 1911 during the process of the Danish Ministry of the Interior taking over colonial administration from the KGH; in their place, local municipal councils were created.
