= Philip R. Rosendahl =

Governor of North Greenland (1925–1928; 1929–1939)

1st Governor of North Greenland
- In office 1929–1939
- Preceded by: Jørgen Berthelsen
- Succeeded by: Eske Brun
- In office 1925–1928
- Preceded by: Harald Lindow as Royal Inspector
- Succeeded by: Jørgen Berthelsen

Personal details
- Born: May 31, 1893 Sakskøbing, Denmark
- Died: October 4, 1974 (aged 81)
- Occupation: Politician, administrator

Philip R. Rosendahl (1893–1974) was the acting governor of the Danish colony of North Greenland from 1925 to 1928 and the governor from 1929 to 1939. A journalist by trade, he moved to Greenland in 1913, and began a lifelong career in the politics of the territory. From 1939 to 1950 he served as secretary, and helped reform the administration once north and south were combined.
