= List of inspectors of Greenland =

Royal Inspector was the highest ranking colonial officer in Danish-ruled Greenland from 1782 until 1924. They were agents of the Royal Greenland Trading Department established by its Instruction of 1782 and reported to the Board of Managers of the company in Copenhagen.

As senior agents of the company, they were generally forbidden under the Instruction from marrying any non-European women, though Inspector Nicolai Zimmer's wife was half-Inuit.

== Royal Inspectors of North Greenland ==
North Greenland comprised the northwest coast of Greenland between Holsteinsborg and Upernavik.

- Johan Friedrich Schwabe (1782–1786)
- Jens Clausen Wille (1786–1790)
- Børge Johan Schultz (1790–1797)
- Claus Bendeke (1797–1803)
- Peter Hanning Motzfeldt (1803–1817)
- Johannes West (1817–1825)
- Carl Peter Holbøll (1825–1828)
- Ludvig Fasting (1828–1843)
- Hans Peter Christian Møller (1843–1845)
- Nicolai Zimmer (1845–1846)
- Christian Søren Marcus Olrik (1846–1866)
- Carl August Ferdinand Bolbroe (1866–1867)
- Sophus Theodor Krarup-Smith (1867–1882)
- Hjalmar Christian Reinholdt (1882–1883) acting
- Niels Alfred Andersen (1883–1898)
- Johan Carl Joensen (1898–1900) acting
- Jens Daugaard-Jensen (1900–1912)
- Anders Peter Olsen (1912–1913) acting
- Harald Lindow (1913–1924)

== Royal Inspectors of South Greenland ==
South Greenland comprised the southwest coast between Sukkertoppen and Nennortalik.

- Bendt Olrik (1782–1789)
- Andreas Molbech Lund (1789–1795)
- Claus Bendeke (1795–1797)
- Niels Rosing Bull (1797–1802)
- Marcus Nissen Myhlenphort (1802–1821) acting (until 1803)
- Christian Alexander Platou (1821–1823) acting
- Arent Christopher Heilmann (1823–1824) acting
- Christian Alexander Platou (1824–1827)
- Ove Valentin Kielsen (1827–1828)
- Carl Peter Holbøll (1828–1856)
- Jørgen Nielsen Møller (1856–1857) acting
- Hinrich Johannes Rink (1857–1868)
- Albert E. Blichfeldt Høyer (1868–1869)
- Hannes Peter Stephensen (1870–1882)
- Frederik Tryde Lassen (1882–1884) acting
- Carl Julius Peter Ryberg (1884–1890)
- Johan Carl Joansen (1890–1891) acting
- Conrad Poul Emil Brummerstedt (1891–1892) acting
- Edgar Christian Fencker (1892–1899)
- Regnar Stephensen (1899–1902)
- Oscar Peter Cornelius Koch (1902–1903)
- Ole Bendixen (1903–1914)
- Oluf Hastrup (1914–1915)
- Carl Frederik Harries (1915–1923)
- Christian Simony (1924) acting
- Knud Oldendow (1924) acting

== Royal Inspector of East Greenland ==
East Greenland comprised the east coast, with Ammassalik and Scoresbysund.

- Ejnar Mikkelsen (1933–1950)

== See also ==
- Major Claus Paarss, the governor of Greenland from 1728–1730
- List of governors of Greenland, for chief administrators after 1924
