= Colony of Greenland =

Danish colony from 1950 to 1953

Colony of Greenland Kalaallit Nunaat (Greenlandic) Grønlands koloni (Danish)
- Colony of Denmark
- 1950–1953
- Flag of Denmark Coat of arms

- The Colony of Greenland and the then Kingdom of Denmark in 1952, highlighted in green and light green respectively
- Capital: Godthåb (Nuuk)
- Government
  - Type: Monarchy; Colony
- King
  - 1950–1953: Frederik IX
- Governor
  - 1950–1953: Poul Hugo Lundsteen
- Historical era: Post-war
  - Unification of North Greenland and South Greenland: 1950
  - Greenland established as a County of Denmark: 5 June 1953
Preceded by	Succeeded by
North Greenland; South Greenland	County of Greenland, Denmark

The colony of Greenland was a Danish colony created in 1950 with the union of North Greenland and South Greenland, and was ruled by one governor. In 1953, the colony of Greenland was made an integral and equal part of the Kingdom of Denmark as an amt, henceforth known as the County of Greenland up until July 1979. On 1 July 1979, Greenland became a rigsdel (an autonomous territory) within the Kingdom of Denmark.

== History ==
Prior to 1950, the island of Greenland had been administered separately as North Greenland and South Greenland under a unified Danish governor. In 1946, Denmark admitted to the United Nations that Greenland was a Danish colony but argued it had not been exploited as other European colonial powers had done to their colonies. The Colony of Greenland was created under the Greenland Acts of 1950 in order to modernise it. In 1953, Denmark revised its constitution to integrate Greenland as a part of the Kingdom of Denmark. This was supported by the United States and Soviet Union who did not want an independent Greenland acting as an unknown buffer zone during the Cold War. The 1953 Danish constitutional and electoral age referendum passed which abolished the Colony of Greenland and transformed it into the County of Greenland with the UN supporting this move in 1954. The County of Greenland was later granted home rule in 1979 following a successful referendum.

In 2019, the Danish Prime Minister apologised to 22 Greenlandic children brought to Denmark away from their families and forced to become Danish as part of a social experiment run by the Danish authorities under the Colony.
