= Rigsdaler =

Rigsdaler is a unit of currency.

Rigsdaler may refer to:

- Danish rigsdaler
- Danish West Indian rigsdaler
- Greenlandic rigsdaler
- Norwegian rigsdaler

See also

- Swedish riksdaler
