= Telephone numbers in Denmark =

- Country: Denmark
- Continent: Europe
- Numbering plan type: closed
- NSN length: 8
- Format: xx xx xx xx
- Country code: +45
- International access: 00
- Long-distance: none

Denmark generally uses an eight-digit closed telephone numbering plan. Subscriber numbers are portable with respect to provider and geography, i.e. fixed line numbers can be ported to any physical address in Denmark.

The Kingdom of Denmark also includes two autonomous regions, the Faroe Islands and Greenland, although each has been assigned its own country calling code and has a separate numbering plan. Previously, the Faroe Islands also used the country code +45.

== Numbering ==
Designation	Range
Reserved for a national or standard European prefix:	01-xx-xx-xx – 09-xx-xx-xx
Carrier preselect:	10-xx
Short numbers:	11-x – 12-x
Short numbers:	18-xx
Network access codes:	16-xx-x
Mobile phones:	20-xx-xx-xx – 31-xx-xx-xx
Mobile phones:	40-xx-xx-xx – 42-xx-xx-xx 49-11-xx-xx
Mobile phones:	50-xx-xx-xx – 55-xx-xx-xx
Mobile phones:	60-xx-xx-xx – 61-xx-xx-xx
Mobile phones:	71-xx-xx-xx
Mobile phones:	81-xx-xx-xx
Mobile phones:	91-xx-xx-xx – 93-xx-xx-xx
Landlines/ISDN:	32-xx-xx-xx – 36-xx-xx-xx
Landlines/ISDN:	38-xx-xx-xx – 39-xx-xx-xx
Landlines/ISDN:	43-xx-xx-xx – 49-10-xx-xx 49-12-xx-xx - 49-99-99-99
Landlines/ISDN:	54-xx-xx-xx – 59-xx-xx-xx
Landlines/ISDN:	62-xx-xx-xx – 66-xx-xx-xx
Landlines/ISDN:	69-xx-xx-xx
Landlines/ISDN:	72-xx-xx-xx – 79-xx-xx-xx
Landlines/ISDN:	82-xx-xx-xx
Landlines/ISDN:	86-xx-xx-xx – 89-xx-xx-xx
Landlines/ISDN:	96-xx-xx-xx – 99-xx-xx-xx
M2M numbers:	37-xx-xxxx-xxxx
Spare numbers:	13-xx-xx-xx – 15-xx-xx-xx
Spare numbers:	17-xx-xx-xx
Spare numbers:	19-xx-xx-xx
Spare numbers:	67-xx-xx-xx – 68-xx-xx-xx
Spare numbers:	83-xx-xx-xx – 85-xx-xx-xx
Spare numbers:	94-xx-xx-xx – 95-xx-xx-xx
Split charge numbers:	70-xx-xx-xx
Freephone:	80-xx-xx-xx
Premium Rate:	90-xx-xx-xx

Split charge is not generally used in Denmark anymore; calls to 70 numbers are usually charged as regular landline calls.

In the latest published numbering plan, from 2016, there are exceptions to the landline series above. Almost all landline series have one or more exception based on their 3rd digit. Eg. 43-xx-xx-xx is designated as landline numbers, however 43-1x-xx-xx has been reassigned as a cellphone range.

== Special numbers ==
- Emergency (Police, Fire, Ambulance): 112
- Police (non-emergency, nearest physical Police Station): 114
- Other 3 digit short codes are reserved.
- Carrier select codes: 10xx
- Service numbers (such as directory enquiries): 18xx
- Carrier select codes for data: 16xxx
- Social services: 116xxx

== Former area codes in Denmark ==
Original area codes for automatic exchanges, from 1950 until 1989	Location
01	Copenhagen and surroundings, as well as Amager (before about 1975)
01	Copenhagen within outer ramparts, and Amager (after about 1975)
02	Flensburg (from Southern Jutland), Malmö (from Zealand) (before ca. 1975)
02	Copenhagen area and North Zealand (Frederiksborg county) (after approx. 1975)
03	Greater Zealand, Lolland, Falster, Møn and Bornholm
04	Southern Jutland
041	Public Paging Service (PPP) approx. 1975 to 1989.
042	Faroe Islands
05	South Jutland
06	East Jutland
07	West Jutland
08	North Jutland
09	Funen with surrounding islands

The Faroe Islands later adopted their own country code +298, with international dialling from Denmark being required.

8-digit numbering took place in the years 1986/87, so that the area code had to be used every time, also for local calls.

On 2. September 1986 in the 01, 02, 03 areas (Zealand, Lolland-Falster, Bornholm and Møn).

On 15. May 1987 in the 09 area (Funen and surrounding islands).

On 16 May 1989, digit 0 was omitted as the first digit, and all telephone numbers should start with a number from 3 to 9.

Former area codes 1989 - approx. 1999
01	became	31
02	became	42
03	became	53
04	became	74
05	became	75
06	became	86
07	became	97
08	became	98
09	became	62, 64, 65, 66.

Today (since 1989) the same telephone number is dialed in Denmark, regardless of where you call from, but the dialling information is still in principle at the forefront of the number. Numbers beginning with 20-31 are preferably mobile numbers, those beginning with 70 and 72-79 are preferably landline numbers, and so on.

== See also ==
- Telephone numbers in the Faroe Islands
- Telephone numbers in Greenland
