= Danish trade monopoly in Iceland =

Historic monopoly on trade in Iceland

The Danish–Icelandic Trade Monopoly (Icelandic: Einokunarverslunin) was the monopoly on trade held by Danish merchants in Iceland in the 17th and 18th centuries. Iceland was during this period a territory controlled by the Danish-Norwegian Crown. The origins of the monopoly may be traced to the mercantilist policies of Denmark-Norway, and its aim was to support Danish merchants and Danish trade against the Hanseatic League of Hamburg, increasing the power of the King of Denmark in Iceland.

The monopoly was enacted by a set of laws passed in 1602 and lasted until 1786. During this period, trade was permitted to take place in 20 (later 25) designated trading posts, according to a fixed rate of prices determined by the king. The merchants acquired the rights to the trading posts in exchange for a fixed rent, with the Vestmannaeyjar being rented at a higher price. For the majority of this period, these leases were managed by Danish trading companies, however, from 1759–1763 and 1774–1787 the leases were managed by the Crown directly.

From 1602 until 1619, the trading monopoly was tied to the Danish cities of Copenhagen, Malmö (now in Sweden) and Helsingør. From 1620, trade was limited to merchants based in Copenhagen exclusively. Danish merchants were forbidden to participate in economic activities in the country other than trade until 1777.

== History ==
=== Early international trade ===
Through the Old Covenant of 1262 the king of Norway had the power to control trade to and from Iceland. With the union of the Danish and Norwegian Crowns in the 14th century, that power was effectively overtaken by the Danish state. However, this power was scarcely excercized until the 17th century.

English merchants became prevalent in trade with Iceland towards the end of the Middle Ages, and from the 1430s until the 1470s, they held a de facto monopoly on the valuable Icelandic stockfish trade. This was much to the frustration of the Danish Crown, which made a variety of efforts to expel them. The crown attempted to enforce licences upon English fishermen operating in Iceland, it prevented English vessels from passing through the Danish straights to trade in the Baltic Sea, and finally offered for Henry VIII to take Iceland as collateral for a loan. Although these efforts failed, the Crown successfully pitted a group of German traders against the English. In the 16th century, German governors were installed in Iceland and a series of skirmishes between English and German traders erupted off of the coast. By 1540 the English lost commercial contact with mainland Iceland, and by 1560 were driven from the islands completely.

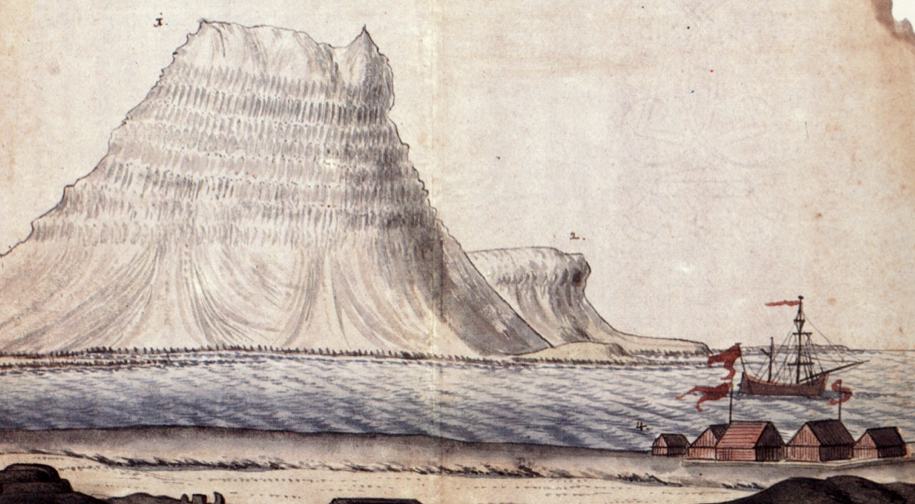
The Danish trading post at Grundarfjörður, as depicted in the 1790s. The post had been operated by German merchants before it was overtaken by Danish traders.

The German merchants from Hamburg were more profitable for the Danish in Iceland. They increased the overall volume of shipping to Iceland, improved competition for stockfish, and offered Icelanders better terms of trade. As the 16th century progressed, German merchants dominated trade in Iceland. The Danish crown increasingly sought to undermine their control and reap the benefits of trade directly. In the mid 16th century all German property in Iceland was confiscated, including fishing boats and other property that was jointly owned by Icelanders.

=== The Crown's monopoly ===
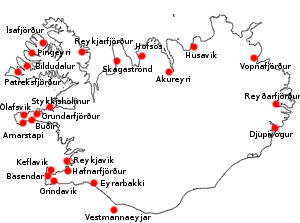
Danish trading posts in Iceland during the Danish trade monopoly 1602–1786

In 1602 all foreign merchants were expulsed from Iceland and only subjects of the Danish-Norwegian Crown were permitted to trade in Iceland. According to the state, this restriction on foreign trade was implemented to help 'stimulate trade and seamanship' within Denmark–Norway. In practice, it was designed to prevent the growing cohort of merchants from Hamburg from renewing their trade privileges, instead handing these trade privileges to Danish and Norwegian merchants, particularly those in Copenhagen, Helsingør, and Malmö.

Merchants wishing to trade in Iceland paid rent to the Crown for trade rights. These trade rights were typically leased to merchants for 6 year periods. The cost of trade rights to a particular port was tied to the volume of fish products it produced, as they were Iceland's most valuable export. This meant that the right to trade with ports in the fishing regions of the southwest were more costly than those with northeastern ports, which primarily exported agricultural products.

=== State trading companies ===
In 1619, restrictions were tightened. These further restrictions are believed to have been in response to the continued presence of German mercantile interests in Iceland, who used Danish merchants as puppets to circumvent the restrictions. To further prevent this, the Crown prohibited the export of Icelandic goods to Hamburg in 1620. The 1619 restrictions mandated that only the Crown's chartered trading company in Copenhagen was allowed to trade with Iceland. The Iceland, Faroe and Northland Company, and its succeeding iterations were not joint-stock companies. Unlike most European colonial companies, it was owned by its operating merchants who conducted business relatively independently.

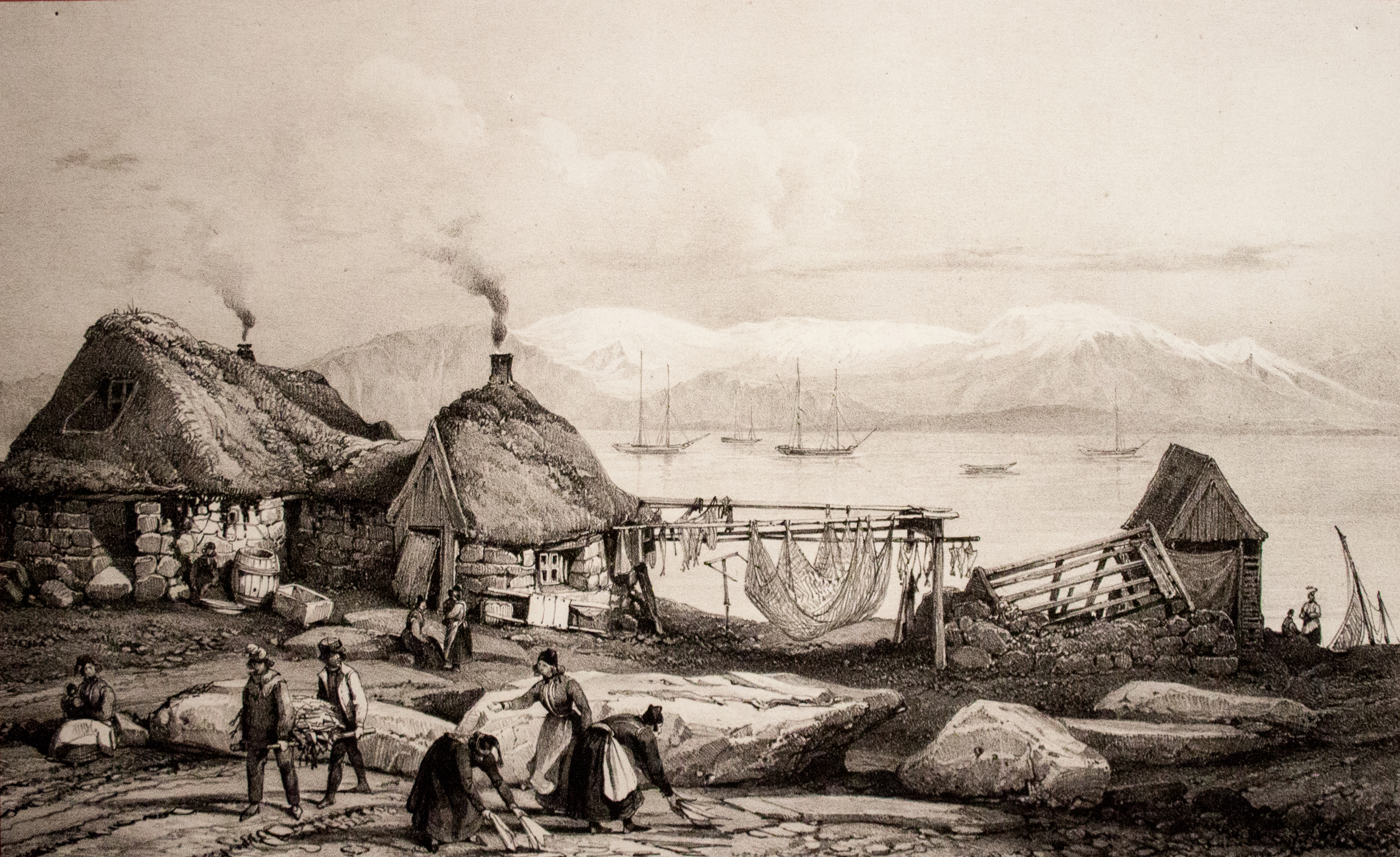
Depiction of a fisherman's hut in Reykjavík made by Joseph Paul Gaimard, 1836

The trade company's prices were fixed by the Crown. These prices rarely changed, and did not fluctuate relative to the international price of goods. However, between 1684 and 1702 prices blatantly favored the Danish merchants. Although prices were fixed, goods were not typically purchased by Icelanders with capital, as little money was in circulation. Imported rye, for example, was typically exchanged for domestic goods, often fish products. Danish merchants exploited this bartering system and routinely undervalued Icelandic goods. This was the case with Icelandic cod, for example, which Danish merchants sold in Europe for more than three times the price they paid Icelanders. The artificially low sale price of fish discouraged Icelandic investment in fishing, and records show a decline in the production of fish products over the period of the trade monopoly.

The Iceland, Faroe and Northland Company collapsed in the 1650s in the fallout of war between Denmark and Sweden. Foreign merchants quickly filled the vacuum left by the trading company. The Crown had difficulty re-establishing its monopoly on trade after the conflict subsided in 1660. After 1660, the crown increased the price of rent for trade rights and four merchants in Copenhagen emerged in control of trade with Iceland. In 1684, changes were again made to trade rules by the crown in an effort to make larger profits. The trade rent was again increased with each port of trade being auctioned off to the highest bidder within Copenhagen. As a result, each port in Iceland came to be controlled by its own merchant. At the same time, the crown changed its fixed prices, increasing the price of goods imported to Iceland, and decreasing the price of goods produced by Icelanders.

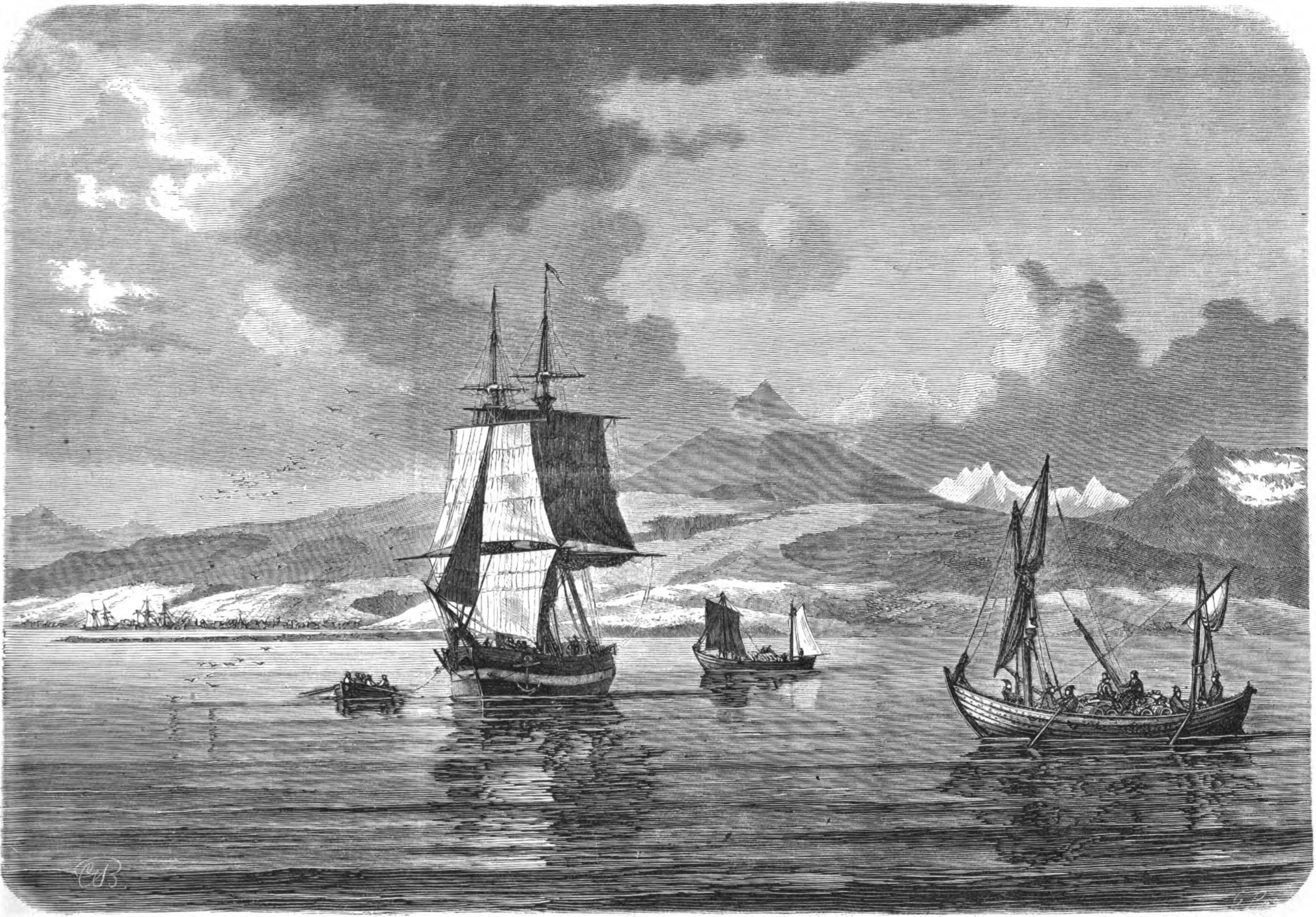
View of ships in the Eyjafjörður, near Akureyri, c. 1870

In 1732, the Crown established a new trading company, the Second Icelandic Company (Danish: Det Andet Islandske kompagni), with its royal charter coming into effect in 1733. The shareholders of the company were exclusively Danish and were primarily smaller merchants with connections to trade in Iceland. The Second Icelandic Company was liquidated by 1743 and in its place the Third Icelandic Company (Det Tredje Islandske Kompagni) was established in connection with the Chandlers Guild. The Crown aimed to again increase its profits off of trade with Iceland, doubling the rent it charged merchants for trade rights. The guild paid the Crown for exclusive rights to trade in Iceland between 1745 and 1770. Following a series of natural disasters and famines in Iceland, the company began to fail and began to be liquidated in 1759.

=== The monopoly's decline ===
In the late 18th century, the Crown made several efforts to improve economic circumstances in Iceland. A Royal Commission (Icelandic: Landsnefndin fyrri) was sent to assess the economic climate of Iceland in 1770 and return with suggestions. After a new regime, which favored classical liberal policies, came in to power it appointed a second Royal Commission in 1785. The second commission concluded that the existing monopoly hurt Icelanders and that trade needed to be opened up in order to improve Iceland's economy. By 1787, the restrictions of the monopoly were reduced and all independent Danish and Norwegian merchants were allowed to trade within Iceland. However, Faroe Islanders and Greenlanders were prevented from establishing independent trade routes. The strict ban on trade with merchants outside of the Kingdom of Denmark-Norway also remained in force.

== Impact ==
The Icelandic public was reliant on foreign imports for household goods, fishing equipment, and food. Under the trading monopoly, Icelanders became reliant on a small number of merchants who could not supply their needs, and the period was marked by scarcity. Smugglers and foreign merchants, who were typically from the Netherlands, are recorded to have violated the Danish monopoly and supplemented the limited supply. The monopoly stagnated economic potential in Iceland, causing demographic crises and maintaining inequality. It also prevented external investment, even from Danish merchants, meaning that all profit derived from trade with Iceland was funnelled back to Denmark.

Although the monopoly officially ended in 1787, demands for free trade with countries outside of the Kingdom of Denmark were not met until 1855. This part of the 19th century also saw increasing ideas of national identity in Iceland, and the former trade monopoly was increasingly viewed as proof of the crown's colonial oppression.

== See also ==
- Danish trade monopoly in the Faroe Islands
- Danish trade monopoly in Greenland
