= Ib Knud Poulsen =

Danish ship captain

Ib (Knud) Poulsen (April 29, 1909 — September 21, 1994) was the Danish-originating Captain of the Sirius Patrol, making him the first commander of a Greenlandic military force, as well as a Legion of Merit (Note: Sources;) recipient, the only person in history to directly command the Patrol, and the sole historic commander of the "Army of Greenland".

He was also a Radio and Telegraph operator and bookseller (Note: Sources;).

== Early life ==
Ib Poulsen was born of April 29, 1909, evidently Danish, he was reportedly born in a "provincial town" somewhere in Denmark. Nothing is known about his mother, but his father was a bookseller.

He served his apprenticeship in a variety of bookshops in Copenhagen. Sometime following his apprenticeship as a bookseller, he aided his father in this endeavor by joining his business also in that same unnamed town, before meeting the secretary of Lauge Koch, and possibly Koch himself here, during a skiing holiday in Norway.

Evidently having lost interest in bookselling, as that had failed to hold truly his interest anyway, even before the meeting, a "spirit of adventure" compelled him; he requested of Koch to take temporary employment in Greenland on Koch's expedition, he was never to be a bookseller again following this brief early period.

Koch accepted Poulsen's proposal, and took him in as an official member of the expedition, with the role of a radio operator under Count Eigil Knuth, from 1933 to 1934, his "ambition" and evidently his goal in and from the request.

Between the years of 1934 to 1939 he served both as a deputy police radio/telegraph operator at Ellaø, and at Eskimonæs as a chief radio operator.

According to the Eventyrernes Klub, in 1940 he volunteered in the Winter War, evidently before April 9, 1940.

When the German Regime invaded Denmark in 1940, Poulsen had been "on leave" and "at home". Count Knuth had stations in Greenland which, even after the Invasion of Denmark and Dunkirk, were still broadcasting meteorological information, Count Knuth's sole station was in fact one of four in Northeastern Greenland which transmitted these messages daily.

These messages were in plain international code, and did not cease in spite of the war, evidently because no party or entity had prevented or obstructed them, and these reports were reportedly accurate, additionally, both British and German forces used these reports. The British had not considered making the station transmit coded versions of their messages and reports, and the Danes had a similar issue of being unable to send reports or messages back, without the consent of the German Authority.

Evidently exchanging with Knuth, who was ostensibly also in Denmark, two points were made, on the first, Knuth's personnel at his station required any kind of relief, and on the second, Poulsen and Knuth agreed that the unencrypted messages had to end as soon as could be reasonably achieved.

Shortly thereafter, the Count appealed to the German Authority to send Poulsen, the Count and two other Danes named Kurt Olsen, at the time a 17 year old radio operator, and Marius Jensen, contemporarily about 30 years of age old, and who was beforehand a hunter in coincidentally Northeastern Greenland prior to the outbreak of hostilities.

The Germans, for their part, wanted the transmissions from the stations to continue indefinitely, at least that relative to the war's duration, and thus approved of the operation, and issued a small ship from Norway to service the four men, who would leave from somewhere in Norway. The ship was called the M/S Veslekari.

== The Sledge Patrol and promotion to Captain ==
The North-East Greenland Sledge Patrol was created in 1941, its headquarters being at Eskimonæs. From August 1941 to March 1943 it officially acted as a police force. Poulsen was its leader, even initially. It was the smallest army ever to see action in World War Two; out of a contemporary Greenlandic population of about 22,000 the army only every recruited 15 during the whole course of its war service.

On March 8, 1943, Patrol member Marius Jensen and his team (Which, including Jensen, was made up of William Arke and Mikael Kunak) set off to patrol the area to the north of Eskimonæs.

On the 11 of March, 1943, the Patrol discovered a human footprint. This was the first of many clues that led to the discovery of German forces at Germaniahavn on the southern coastline of Sabine that very day.

The Patrol attempted a return to Eskimonæs to warn the others, but Jensen believed the dogs used by the Patrol to be too exhausted to continue, so the Patrol set up at a position known as Cape Wynn eight kilometers south of Sabine, which they arrived at a few hours after the discovery only to be attacked by German forces in a night raid. Poulsen thought the resting action an egregious mistake and critical error on the part of Jensen, and he thought Jensen only redeemed himself for his failings in subsequent actions.

There was no time to ready the dogs the Patrol relied on for travel in the wake of the attack, so, fleeing the raid was a task accomplished on foot by Jensen and his team, all of whom successfully escaped the engagement but fled without adequate winter clothing or supplies and the team had split from Jensen accidentally along the way.

In the perspective of Poulsen and the rest at Eskimonæs, on the Morning of the 13 of March at about 11 o'clock, Poulsen reportedly, out of sheer habit, peered out across the ice and spotted a "dark speck", what was apparently a lone individual roughly three miles to the east.

Poulsen immediately dispatched member Eli Knudsen to rally the dogs and set off to intercept the individual so that he could bring the figure over, while he went into the camp and prepared. It was said that Poulsen had "imagined every possible disaster" by the time Knudsen returned with the individual, Marius Jensen. When they had helped Jensen indoors, they discovered that he was reportedly grey with fatigue, frostbitten (though, rather fortunately only in the first degree), and missing his boots; he had been walking in the snow with mere socks to protect him. Later, the others arrived, reportedly "bedraggled" but otherwise not in critical condition.

Jensen later "borrowed" about eight dogs from Eskimonæs to replace the ones abandoned at Cape Wynn.

Poulsen then radioed governor Eske Brun, the effective ruler of Greenland, with news of the Germans.

The Patrol lacked a military status beforehand, but after the discovery on Sabine, Eske Brun authorized them to act as military forces, (in large part because of legal concerns, such as how they were not officially military personnel) with Ib Poulsen being given the role of Captain shortly thereafter, creating the so-called "Army of Greenland" in the process, the first and only such institution or force of its kind in all of history, making Ib Poulsen the first and only leader of any Greenlandic military force.

Poulsen understood that the problem of the base at Sabine would be taken care of by the American Air Force sometime later, but in the moment he prepared for a German attack of Eskimonæs. There was a genuine fear of an enemy air raid, as no one knew precisely what the German forces had on hand. Poulsen's first plan was to rally as many men as he could.

== Effects of Poulsen's leadership, Akre controversy and later life ==
Thanks to Poulsen's "tuition" of them, Kurt Olsen had reportedly matured mentally and physically, whereas cousins Bjarne and Oddvar Akre thought that, in spite of the patrols activities, at least Ib Poulsen and Eli Knudsen, and at most them and all the other Danish elements of the Patrol were in fact German collaborators or at least sympathizers, who wished to kill the pair. The cousins and Ib Poulsen disagreed on effectively every decision made by the latter, and they were generally unhappy with their Danish peers.

The former of the two cousins would go on to write a book in 1983, titled ’Heltene’ i Kald Krig (transl. 'Heroes' of the Winter War) where he brought his thoughts to light, and this book is generally considered very radical and controversial. In the book Bjarne goes so far as to accuse Eli Knudsen of having been a Nazi who was alleged to have not been shot by German forces and instead having been smuggled back to Germany itself, among other rather bold claims.

He was at least partially responsible for the construction of the Danmarkshavn weather station sometime between 1948 and 1950. In his later years he was dubbed "the major", and was made leader of the Sled Patrol again following its reforming in 1950. From 1961 to 1979 he reportedly was involved in Greenlandic telecommunications. He died on September 21, 1994, under unknown circumstances. He was 85 years old.
