= Eske Brun =

Greenlandic civil servant (1904–1987)

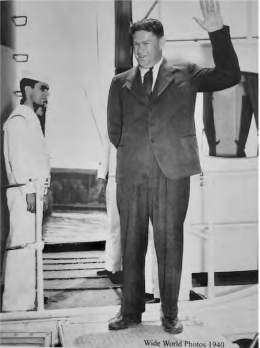
- Brun in 1940
- Born: 25 May 1904; Aalborg, Northern Jutland, Denmark
- Died: 11 October 1987 (aged 83)
- Resting place: Humlebæk Cemetery
- Education: University of Copenhagen, 1929
- Occupations: Governor of North Greenland, Vice President of the Greenland Administration, President of the Greenland Administration
- Known for: Sometimes known as the "Founder of Modern Greenland"
- Spouse: Ingrid Winkel (m. 1937)
- Children: 3
- Father: Charles Brun

Eske Brun (25 May 1904 – 11 October 1987) was a Danish civil servant in and later governor of Greenland and connected to Greenland from 1932 to 1964.

== Early life and career ==
Eske Brun was born on 25 May 1904 in Aalborg to Charles Brun, a politician, regional official and chamberlain, and Rigmor Brun (née Hansen; 1875-1948). On 12 July 1904, Brun was baptised at the Abbey of Our Lady. Brun was one of six siblings. Following the death of his father in 1919, Brun and his family moved to moved to Ordrup.

He began studying in 1922, and received a law-degree from the University of Copenhagen in 1929. In 1932, at the age of 28, Eske Brun first visited Greenland, and was given a substitute job as governor of North Greenland situated in Godhavn, Greenland. In 1939 he received a permanent position as governor. On September 17, 1937 in Copenhagen, Denmark, Eske Brun married Ingrid Winkel.

== World War II and ensuing service ==
During World War II, the connection to Copenhagen, the capital of the Kingdom of Denmark, which Greenland was a part of, was severed on account of the German occupation after Operation Weserübung in 1940. His colleague Aksel Svane, via the law concerning the government of Greenland of 1925, took control of the island, becoming de facto "Independent." But during the occupation, Greenland had increased self-determination because the Danish political system was in shambles, they established supply-lines from the United States and Canada with the help of the Danish ambassador in Washington, Henrik Kauffmann. From 1941 until the end of the war, Aksel Svane was situated in the U.S. to organize the supplies and Eske Brun became governor of South Greenland as well. The administration was centralized in Godthåb (Nuuk).

=== Greenland under Eske Brun's Administration ===
Greenland was effectively able to survive reasonably well during the conflict with at least the majority of aspects in wartime existence, with the Ivittut Cryolite mine being a major contribution in keeping Greenland stable. Ivittut, having held the world's largest reserve of naturally occurring Cryolite, a mineral that was used in the manufacturing of fighter planes and aluminum, there was a genuine fear that:

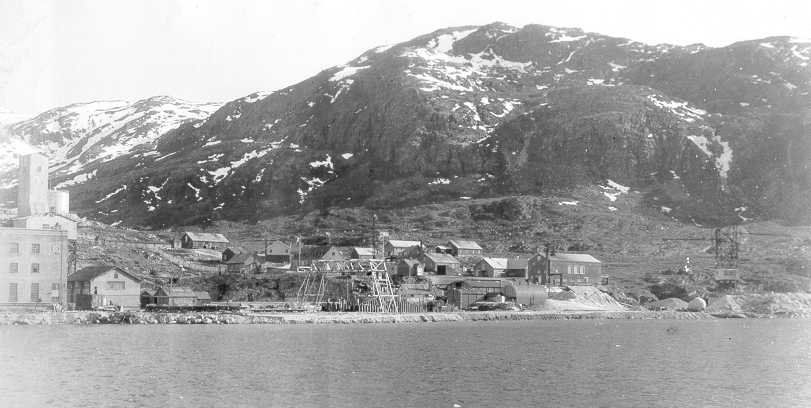
Cryolite mine of Ivigtut, Greenland, photograph from sometime in the Summer of 1940.

“one well-directed shot from the deck gun of a German submarine or a clever act of sabotage by one of the workmen could have seriously damaged the cryolite mine, might have perhaps put it out of operation and thereby disrupted the Canadian aluminum industry, on which Allied aircraft production was heavily dependent. To prevent this, the local authorities had organized a mine guard armed with rifles and a few machine guns and had obtained from the United States a 3-inch Anti-Aircraft Gun manner by former U.S. Coast Guard gunners.".

Were this fear realized, then this would have negatively impacted the production of Aluminum, seeing its usage in it, and the production of Aircraft for the war effort would have been hampered significantly, which would have most certainly damaged the Allied war effort, if not destroyed production of aeronautic weaponry entirely in the United States and Canada. Cryolite is used as a solvent for bauxite in the electrolytic production of aluminum and has various other metallurgical applications, and is used in the glass and enamel industries, and Aluminum is used in aircraft due to its lightweight nature. Supplies were provided by the United States and included surveying operations to scout the Greenlandic coastline, the patrols' effectiveness was decreased significantly with the poor weather of the area.

==== Establishment of the Sirius Dog Sled Patrol ====
Eske Brun, instead of deciding to request the requisition of additional naval expeditions to the coast of Greenland, as the patrols were, decided that Greenland must have a defensive military force protecting itself. Greenlandic self-sufficiency was, among another reason, to report any suspected or actual landings of hostile German military forces. Brun made an appeal to Greenland's guides and hunters to join an elite unit tasked with patrolling the most remote areas of the colony. Using the rifles left by the Americans, he directed the creation of what became the Sirius Dog Sled Patrol (Slædepatruljen Sirius). The 15 man volunteer team was made up of native Inuit, Danish colonists, and Norwegian expatriates. Though Ib Poulsen would be the "Chief" of the Patrol.

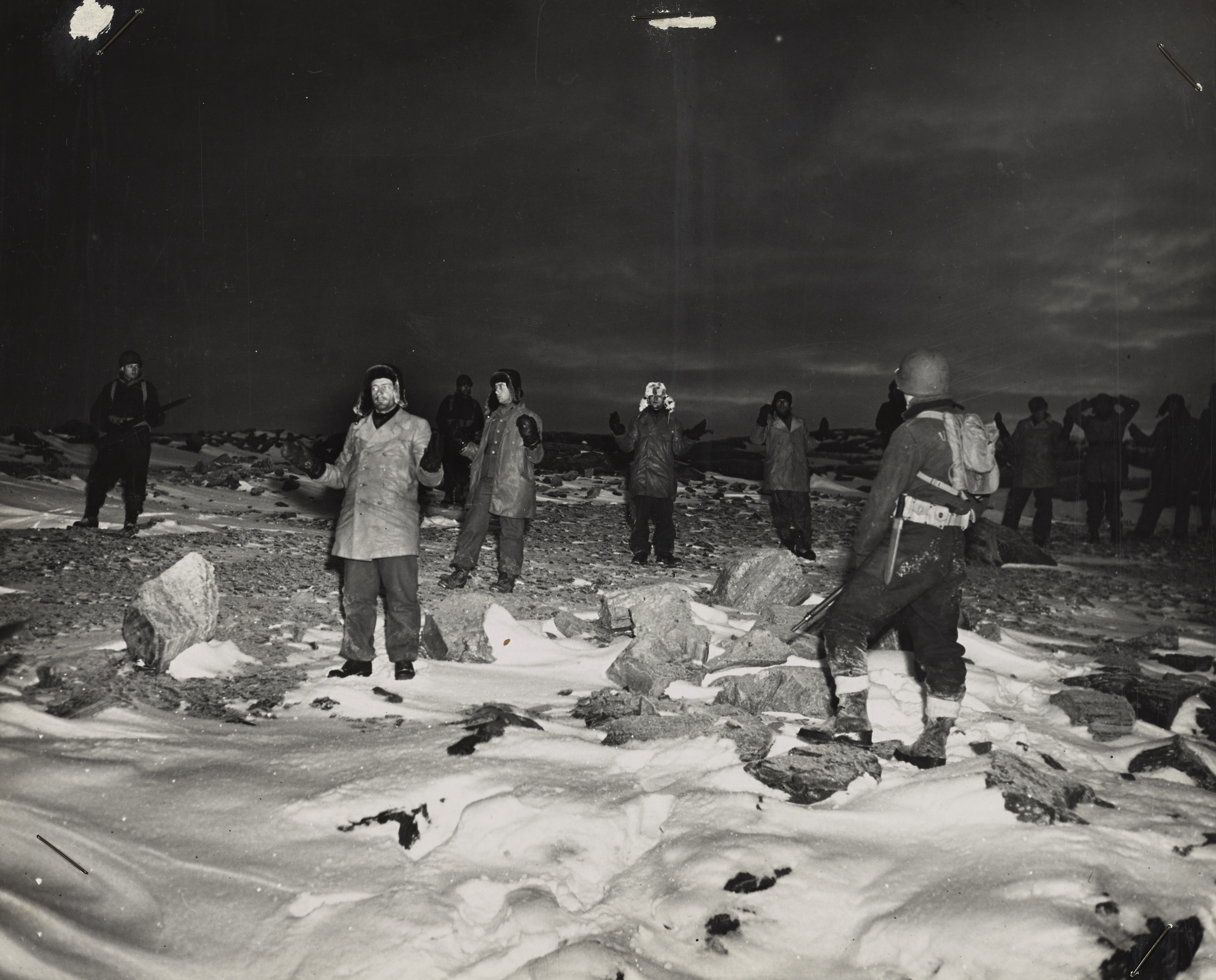
Members of the Edelweiss II weather station in north-eastern Greenland taken prisoner by American soldiers, October 4, 1944

Additionally, the patrol's establishment and continued service had a significant and positive impact on Allied morale [relevant to the location.], and a morale-supportive goal, the specter of it -and, Greenland as a whole's- continued resistance demonstrated clearly, without any obfuscation, to the occupying United States forces that the Greenlandic, and, by extension, Danish people were willing to defy Germany, without regard, German forces did achieve their object. That being, the successful establishment of covert weather stations on the Greenlandic coastline, the creation of which was able to transmit information to Nazi German U-Boats with intelligence regarding weather conditions in Northern Europe. There were few engagements between the German expeditions and the Patrol, yet the few skirmishes and mild engagements that did in fact occur were enough to cause Axis forces to eventually capitulate and withdraw, amongst other reasons for their defeat.

The U.S. Coast Guard Cutter, the Nanok (Inuit word for "Polar Bear"), was sent to Greenland and joined the Coast Guard's Greenland Patrol sometime in 1942.

When news of the liberation of Denmark reached Greenland on May 4, 1945, Brun returned all authority back to the Danish Government, and he would later return to Denmark. The next day, when Denmark was liberated proper, on May 5, 1945, Danish liberty from German occupation took effect. The event was celebrated in Nuuk.

== Later life ==
Following the war Eske Brun was made vice-president of the Greenland Administration in 1947. In January 1949 he succeeded Knud Oldendow as president.

Eske Brun worked as a senior official until his voluntary retirement in 1964 after disputes concerning equality between Danes and Greenlanders.

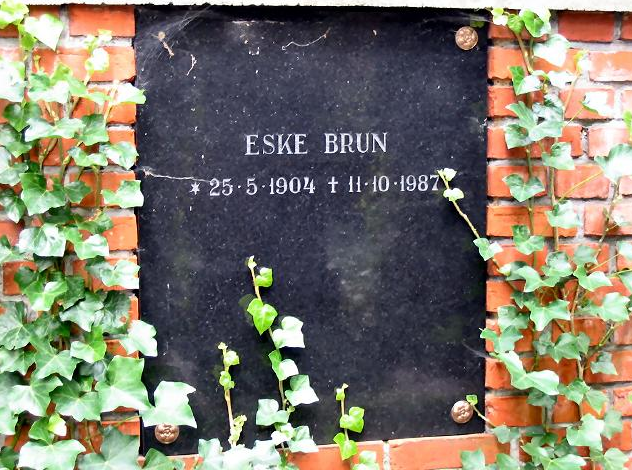
Eske Brun's burial site

Eske Brun was buried in the Humlebæk Cemetery, Zealand, Denmark, following his death on October 11, 1987, in Soelleroed, Zealand, Denmark. No document revealing Eske Brun's cause of death has ever been uncovered.

Among Greenlanders, there is some debate as to whether Eske Brun was the "Originator" of "Modern Greenland", with little discussion remaining due to the obscure nature of his existence. Eske Brun is also portrayed in Philatelic Pursuits.
