= Hans Peter Christian Møller =

Royal Inspector of North Greenland
- In office 1843–1845
- Preceded by: Ludvig Fasting
- Succeeded by: Nicolai Zimmer

Personal details
- Born: 2 November 1810 Helsingør, Denmark
- Died: 18 October 1845 (aged 34) Rome, Papal States
- Occupation: Zoologist, malacologist, administrator

Hans Peter Christian Møller (1810–1845) was a Danish malacologist and Inspector of North Greenland.

He studied at the Sorø Academy, where he studied theology and zoology. He later became a lieutenant in the Royal Danish Navy and traveled to Greenland to pursue his passion for malacology. While there, he wrote the Index Molluscorum Grönlandiae, which described all of the mollusks native to Greenland.

From 1843 to 1845 he served as Inspector of Colonies and Whaling in North Greenland before his untimely death in Rome at the age of 34.

Møller's sister Sophie married Christian Søren Marcus Olrik, who later also served as inspector.

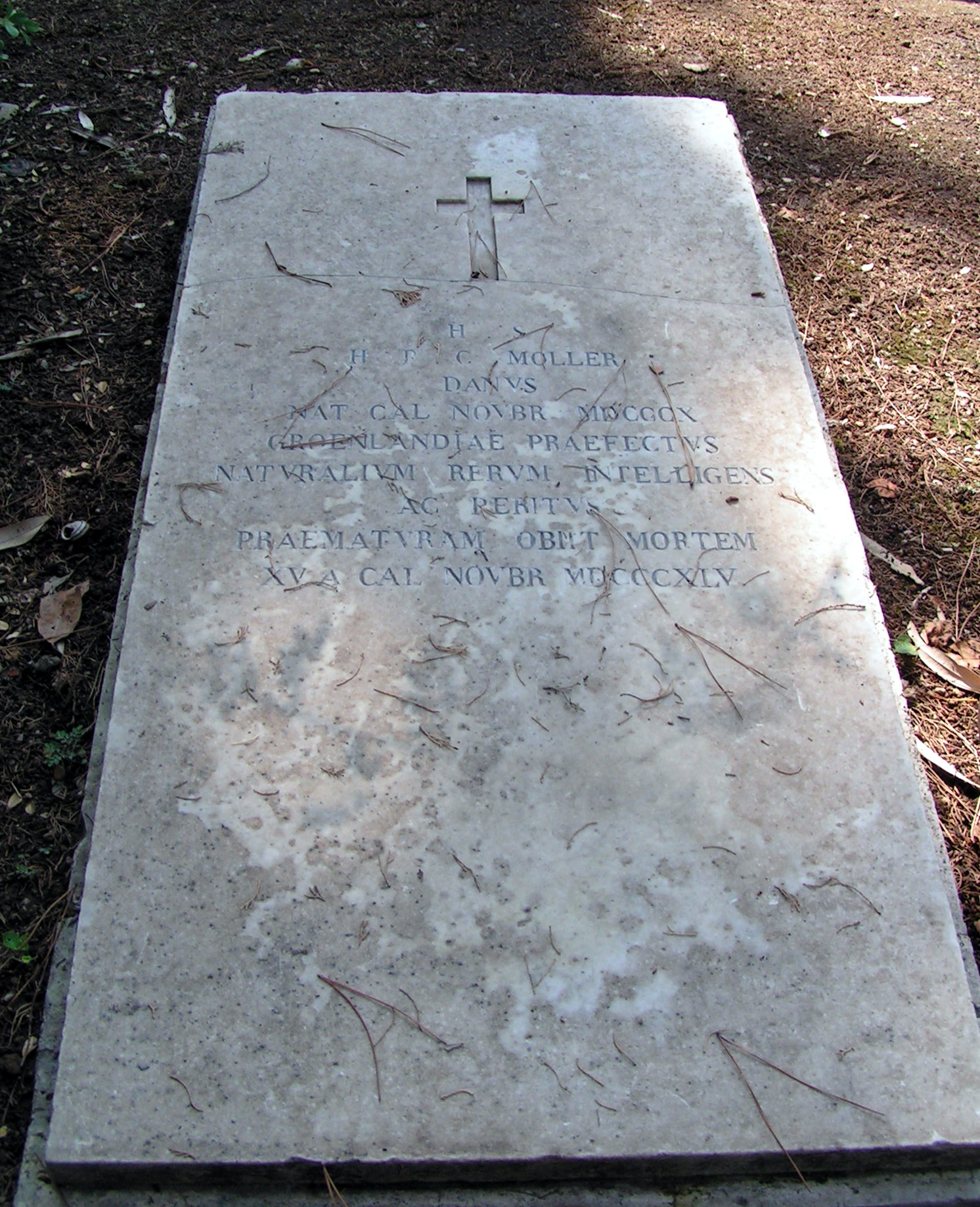
Møller's gravestone in Rome

== See also ==
- List of inspectors of Greenland
