= Claus Bendeke =

Norwegian jurist and government official

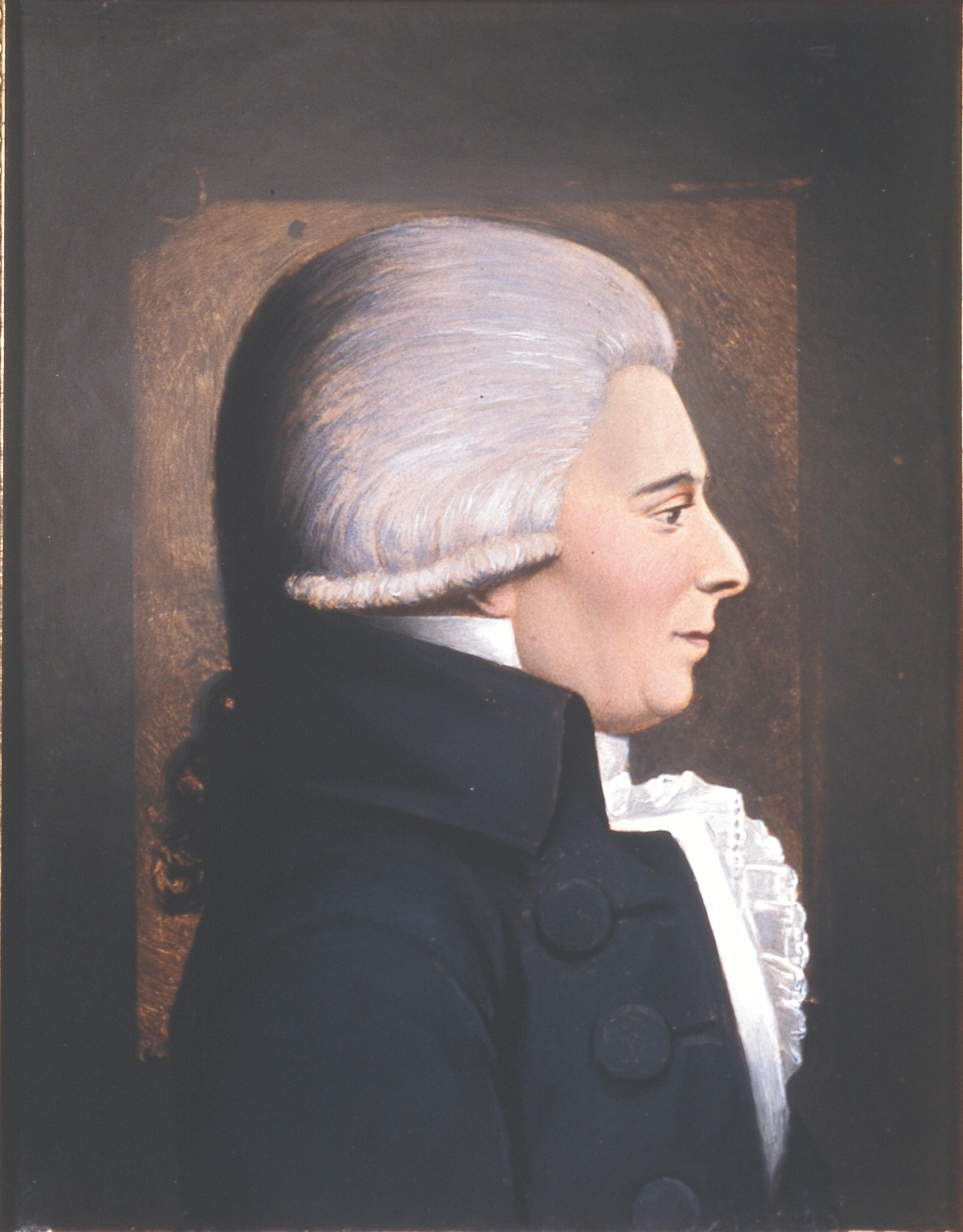

Royal Inspector of North Greenland
- In office 1797–1803
- Preceded by: Børge Johan Schulz
- Succeeded by: Peter Hanning Motzfeldt

Royal Inspector of South Greenland
- In office 1795–1797
- Preceded by: Andreas Molbech Lund
- Succeeded by: Niels Rosing Bull

Personal details
- Born: 3 December 1763 Vang, Oldenburg Monarchy
- Died: 29 May 1828 (aged 64) Kristiansand, Norway
- Occupation: Jurist, administrator, lawyer, merchant

Claus Bendeke (3 December 1763 – 29 May 1828) was a Norwegian jurist and government official. He served as a representative at the Norwegian Constitutional Assembly.

Claus Bendeke was born at Vang in Hamar in Hedmark county, Norway. He was the son of Magistrate and Chancellor Andreas Bendeke (1712-1780). In 1783, he became a student at Elsinore school in Helsingør and in 1788 he studied law. In 1795, he became merchant and whaling inspector in Greenland from a service location in Nuuk. He served as District Governor in Hedmark from 1804 to 1816. In September 1816, he was appointed Assessor in Christiania (now Oslo) Court and was Counselor from 1823. Bendek was married to Magdalene Cathrine Pihl (1787-1843), daughter of Abraham Pihl. The couple made their home at Kjonerud, a farm in Stange where they raised their family.

He represented Hedemarken amt (now Hedmark) at the Norwegian Constituent Assembly at Eidsvoll Manor in 1814. At the Assembly, he supported the position of the independence party (Selvstendighetspartiet).

== Related Reading ==
- Holme Jørn (2014) De kom fra alle kanter - Eidsvollsmennene og deres hus (Oslo: Cappelen Damm) ISBN 978-82-02-44564-5

Civic offices
Preceded by Nicolai Emanuel de Thygeson	County Governor of Hedmark; 1804–1816	Succeeded by Lauritz Weidemann
