= Danish Realm =

Sovereign state

Kingdom of Denmark
Kongeriget Danmark (Danish)
(in local languages)
Faroese	Kongsríki Danmarkar
Greenlandic	Kunngeqarfik Danmarki
- Flag of Denmark Royal coat of arms
- Motto: Forbundne, forpligtet, for kongeriget Danmark (Note: The motto of Denmark is the motto of the reigning monarch, chosen after accession. The existing motto is that of Frederik X.) (United, committed, for the Kingdom of Denmark)
- Anthems: Der er et yndigt land (English: "There is a lovely country") Kong Christian stod ved højen mast (Note: Kong Christian has equal status as a national anthem but is generally used only on royal and military occasions.) (English: "King Christian stood by the lofty mast")

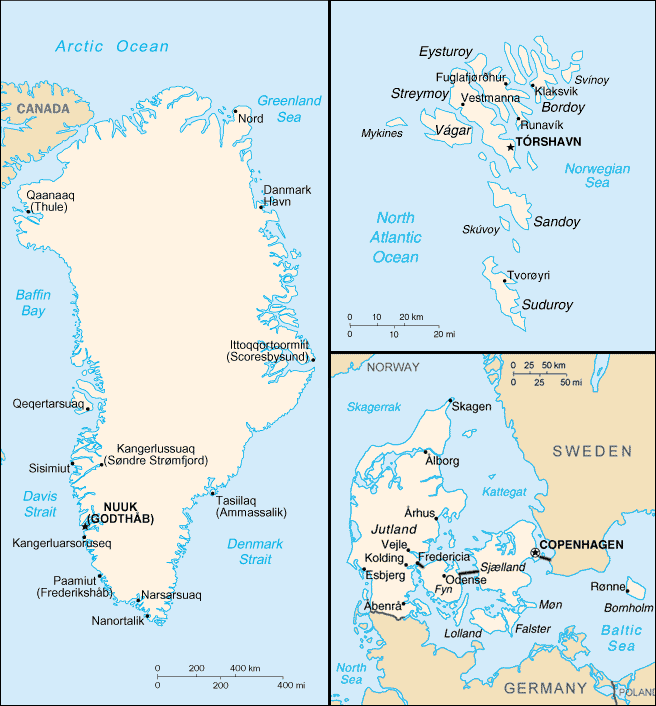
- Clockwise from top left (sizes not to scale): maps of Greenland, the Faroe Islands, Denmark
- Capital and largest city: Copenhagen (Note: Copenhagen is the constitutional capital of the kingdom and Denmark; Tórshavn is the capital of the Faroe Islands; Nuuk is the capital of Greenland.)
- Official languages: Danish; locally: Faroese; Greenlandic
- Recognised regional languages: German (Note: Faroese is co-official with Danish in the Faroe Islands. Greenlandic is the sole official language in Greenland. German is recognised as a protected minority language in the South Jutland area of Denmark.)
- Demonyms: Danish; locally: Greenlander; Faroe Islander, Faroese
- Constituent territories (non‑sovereign parts): Denmark (main) and separate parts: Faroe Islands; Greenland
- Government: Unitary parliamentary constitutional monarchy
  - Monarch: Frederik X
  - Prime Minister: Mette Frederiksen
  - Prime Minister of the Faroe Islands: Beinir Johannesen
  - Prime Minister of Greenland: Jens-Frederik Nielsen
- Legislature: Folketing, with some authority devolved to Løgting (Faroe Islands) and Inatsisartut (Greenland)

History
  - Unification: c. 965
  - Faroese home rule: 24 March 1948
  - Incorporation of Greenland: 1953
  - Greenlandic home rule: 1 May 1979
  - Faroese takeover act: 29 July 2005
  - Greenlandic self rule: 21 June 2009

Area
  - Denmark: 42,926 km^{2} (16,574 sq mi) (12th)
  - Faroe Islands: 1,396 km^{2} (538.999 sq mi)
  - Greenland: 2,166,086 km^{2} (836,330 sq mi)

Population
  - Q2 2023 estimate: 6,049,579 (112th)
  - Denmark: 5,941,388
  - Greenland and Faroe Islands: 108,191
- GDP (PPP): 2022 estimate
  - Total: €380 billion
  - Per capita: €62,814
- GDP (nominal): 2019-2024 estimate
  - Total: $418.659 billion
  - Per capita: $69,205
- HDI (2021): 0.948 very high
- Currency: Danish krone (Note: In the Faroe Islands, the currency has a separate design and is known as the Faroese króna, but is not a separate currency.) (DKK)
- Time zone: List: UTC+1 (CET) (Denmark); UTC (WET) (Faroe Islands); UTC-4 to 0 (AST, WGT, EGT, GMT) (Greenland)
  - Summer (DST): List: UTC+2 (CEST) (Denmark); UTC+1 (WEST) (Faroe Islands); UTC-3 to 0 (ADT, WGST, EGST, GMT) (Greenland)
- Calling code: 3 codes: +45 (Denmark); +298 (Faroe Islands); +299 (Greenland)
- ISO 3166 code: DK
- Internet TLD: 3 TLDs: .dk (Denmark) (Note: Also .eu, shared with other EU member states.); .fo (Faroe Islands); .gl (Greenland)

The Danish Realm, (Note: Danish: Danmarks Rige; Faroese: Danmarkar Ríki; Greenlandic: Danmarkip Naalagaaffik) officially the Kingdom of Denmark, (Note: Danish: Kongeriget Danmark, pronounced [ˈkʰɔŋəʁiːð̩ ˈtænmɑk]; Faroese: Kongsríki Danmarkar; Greenlandic: Kunngeqarfik Danmarki) often known as Denmark, (Note: Danish and Greenlandic: Danmark; Faroese: Danmark or Danmørk) is a sovereign state consisting of a collection of constituent territories united by the Constitutional Act, which applies to the entire territory. It consists of metropolitan Denmark (sometimes called "Denmark proper") (Note: Danish: egentlige Danmark)—the kingdom's territory in continental Europe and its proximate islands—and the realm's two autonomous (but not sovereign) regions: the Faroe Islands in the North Atlantic and Greenland in North America. The relationship between the three parts of the kingdom is known as Rigsfællesskabet (The Unity of the Realm, (Note: Danish: Rigsfællesskabet; Faroese: ríkisfelagsskapurin; Greenlandic: naalagaaffeqatigiinneq) which has also been translated as the Danish Commonwealth or the United Kingdom of Denmark).

The Kingdom of Denmark is not a federation, but a concept encompassing the three autonomous legal systems of Denmark, the Faroe Islands and Greenland, united under its monarch. The Kingdom of Denmark is a unitary sovereign state. It has Arctic territorial claims in the Arctic Ocean: various sites near the North Pole (Lomonosov Ridge, Gakkel Ridge, and the Alpha-Mendeleev Ridge complex). The Kingdom of Denmark constitutionally encompasses the realm or the country, but the Faroe Islands and Greenland have an extended degree of autonomy to govern their relations.

The Faroe Islands and Greenland have been under the Crown of Denmark since 1397 (de facto) when the Kalmar Union was ratified, and part of the Danish Realm since 1814 (de jure). Due to their separate historical and cultural identities, these parts of the realm have an extensive degree of self-government and have assumed legislative and administrative responsibility in a substantial number of fields.

Legal matters in the country or realm are subject to the Constitution of the Realm of Denmark. It stipulates that it applies for all parts of the Kingdom of Denmark and that legislative, executive and judicial powers are the responsibility of the Parliament of the Kingdom of Denmark (Danish: Folketing), the Government of Denmark and the Supreme Court of Denmark. The Faroe Islands were granted home rule via an independence referendum in 1946, and Greenland obtained this in a 1979 referendum. In 2005, the Faroes received a self-government arrangement, and in 2009 Greenland received "self rule", which left the government of Denmark with little influence over the matters of internal affairs that are devolved to the local governments of Greenland and the Faroe Islands.

The country or realm has land borders with Germany (the Danish-German border) and Canada (Hans Island), and a road and rail bridge-tunnel (Øresund/Öresund Bridge) that connects to Malmö, Sweden (the Danish-Swedish border).

== Naming ==
The Constitution of the Kingdom of Denmark refers to the state's territory as Danmarks Rige (Danish Realm), which means "The Realm of Denmark".

The Danish term rigsfællesskabet, translated as 'the unity of the Realm', the "commonwealth of the Realm", the "Danish Commonwealth" or the "United Kingdom of Denmark", refers to the constitutional status of the relationship between Denmark, the Faroe Islands, and Greenland.

The name was used by Danish and Greenlandic authorities in the negotiations for home rule introduced in 1979, and has become popular since the beginning of the 1990s. The acts establishing the 1948 Faroese home rule and the 1979 Greenlandic home rule use the term rigsenheden instead. Jurist Frederik Harhoff argued in 1993 that rigsenheden should be replaced with rigsfællesskabet, as the former implies a common identity, while the latter implied a community of different identities. The use of the expression Rigsfællesskabet though can be traced back to at least 1908.

== Population and area ==
Comparison map: Greenland, the Faroe Islands (enlarged) and Denmark (enlarged) differ significantly in size. The Danish Realm is spread far apart, across the North Atlantic Ocean and North Sea.

Denmark's population is by far the largest of the three; just over six million people live in Denmark, and about 52,000 and 56,000 in the Faroe Islands and Greenland, respectively. In comparison, there are ten cities in Denmark with a population above 50,000 people. Denmark is populated by the Danes, the Faroe Islands by the Faroese, and Greenland by the Greenlandic Inuit. In both the Faroe Islands and Greenland, Danes make up 7.6% of the population, as of 2018. As of 2020, there are about 11,000 Faroese-born and 17,000 Greenlandic-born people living in Denmark.

With respect to area, Greenland is by far the largest, and makes up 98% of the realm. The entire kingdom has an area of 2.2 million square kilometres (0.85 million square miles), and is according to The World Factbook the twelfth-largest country in the world, the same rank held by Greenland alone. Denmark alone has an area of about 43,000 km^{2}, and is no. 133 on that list. Denmark is situated in Northern Europe and is flat and arable; the Faroe Islands are in the Northern Atlantic and are rugged, with cliffs along the coast; while Greenland is in the North Atlantic and the Arctic, and is 79% covered in ice. Greenland is the most sparsely populated territory in the world, according to the World Bank.

Area and population of the Danish Realm
Part	Capital	Official language(s)	Area		Population (2023)		
Part	Capital	Official language(s)	km^{2}	%	Population	%	Density
Denmark	Copenhagen	Danish	42,926	1.94%	5,964,059	98.17%	135.65 per km^{2}
Faroe Islands	Tórshavn	Faroese, Danish	1,396	0.06%	54,547	0.88%	37.36 per km^{2}
Greenland	Nuuk	Greenlandic	2,166,086	98.00%	56,643	0.95%	0.03 per km^{2}
Entire realm			2,210,408	100.00%	6,075,249	100.00%	2.68 per km^{2}

The Kingdom has submitted five claims to the United Nations that its exclusive economic zone extends beyond the usual 200 nautical miles limit: one north and one south of the Faroe Islands, and three around Greenland. One Greenlandic claim includes the North Pole and the Lomonosov Ridge, and extends all the way to the Russian exclusive economic zone. Claims overlapping with other nations' claims have to be resolved through negotiation; in 2019, Iceland, Norway and the Kingdom of Denmark settled their claims to the area north of the Faroe Islands.

The Kingdom was in a dispute with Canada on who has sovereignty over Hans Island between 1978 and 2022. The two governments eventually settled on a border running approximately halfway through the island, establishing a land border between the two states.

== Historical background ==
The Faroe Islands were settled by Norwegian Vikings in the 9th century, displacing Irish monks already there. Iceland was settled in the 9th century by Norsemen, and was a free state until 1262/1264, when it came under Norwegian taxation. Greenland, later populated by the Indigenous Greenlandic Inuit, was settled by Norse (Norwegians and Icelanders) in the 10th century, among those being Erik the Red. The connection to Greenland was lost in the 15th century, but Denmark–Norway again established connections in 1721 through the missionary Hans Egede.

In 1814, Denmark ceded Norway to Sweden under the Treaty of Kiel, but kept control of the Faroe Islands, Greenland, and Iceland. The colonies on Greenland were situated on the west coast, and as a condition for the sale of the Danish West Indies to the United States in 1917, the U.S. recognised Danish sovereignty over the whole island, and most countries followed suit. One exception was Norway who in 1931 occupied parts of East Greenland, but abandoned their claim in 1933, when it lost the case at the Permanent Court of International Justice.

=== Iceland's independence ===
In Iceland there was a growing nationalism in the 19th century, and Iceland was in 1874 given its own constitution and increased autonomy, but still with the executive power in Danish hands. Iceland was granted home rule in 1904, and, by the Danish–Icelandic Act of Union, full independence in 1918. The act established a personal union between Denmark and the newly created Kingdom of Iceland, with Denmark handling coastal protection and foreign affairs. In 1944, Iceland abolished the personal union and adopted a new constitution that established the current republic, after a referendum on the subject. This happened during World War II, where Denmark and Iceland were cut off from each other, as Denmark was occupied by Germany, and Iceland by the United States.

The Faroe Islands were made a Danish county in 1816, and with the constitution of 1849, it gained representation in the Rigsdag. During World War II, the Faroe Islands were occupied by the United Kingdom and they largely administered themselves. After the war, it was clear that the old system could not be reinstated. In an independence referendum in 1946, 50.7% of the Faeroese voted for independence, but the result was rejected by the Danish government. Instead, after negotiations between the Faroe Islands and Denmark, the Faroe Islands were granted "home rule" in 1948.

Greenland was originally administered as two separate colonies, viz. North and South Greenland. In 1950, these two were merged as the Colony of Greenland. Following the constitutional reform in 1953, Greenland was incorporated into Denmark as a county and given representation in the Folketing. When Denmark joined the European Communities (EC) in 1972, Greenland followed, despite 70% of the Greenlandic voters voting against it in the referendum. As a home rule agreement would allow them to leave again (the Faroe Islands did not join the EC), this was an important factor in the increasing support for home rule. Another factor was a desire to make Greenland more Greenlandic and less Danish. They were given home rule in 1979 and left the EC in 1985. Under the home rule agreement, Greenland gradually took over more responsibility from the Danish state. In 2009, the home rule was replaced with "self rule", granting greater autonomy.

== Constitutional status ==
The Danish constitution also applies in the Faroe Islands and Greenland, as section one states that it "shall apply to all parts of the Kingdom of Denmark". The sovereignty of the Faroe Islands and Greenland is held by the Danish state. The Kingdom of Denmark is a unitary state, with the Folketing being its unicameral legislature. The Faroe Islands and Greenland each elect two members to the parliament; the remaining 175 members are elected in Denmark.

=== Home rule and self rule ===
The Folketing have by law given the Faroe Islands and Greenland extensive autonomy; the Faroe Islands were given "home rule" in 1948, and Greenland in 1979. Greenland's home rule was replaced in 2009 by "self rule". There is an ongoing legal debate about what constitutional weight these arrangements have. In general, there are two conflicting views: (a) the laws delegate power from the Folketing and can be revoked unilaterally by it, and (b) the laws have special status so changes require the consent of the Faroese Løgting or the Greenlandic Inatsisartut, respectively.

Proponents of the first interpretation include Alf Ross, Poul Meyer and Jens Peter Christensen. Ross, the chief architect of Faroese home rule, argued that it was "a municipal self-government of extraordinary extensive scope". Meyer wrote in 1947, prior to Faroese home rule, that since section 2 of the 1915 constitution gave Rigsdagen legislative power, any laws by the Løgting necessarily derived its authority from powers delegated to it from Rigsdagen. With regard to the extent Rigsdagen was allowed to delegate its legislative power under section 2, Meyers argued that more powers could be delegated to the Faroe Islands than other parts of the country, due to its special history. Similarly, Christensen, a Supreme Court judge, said that due to the special circumstances, the scope of delegation need not be strictly defined.

Proponents of the second interpretation include Edward Mitens, Max Sørensen and Frederik Harhoff. Mitens, a Faroese jurist and politician, argued that Faroese home rule had been approved by both the Løgting and the Rigsdag, so it was an agreement between two parties, in particular because the approval by the Løgting happened according to special rules put in place in 1940 with the consent of the Danish representative there, during the occupation by the United Kingdom. Sørensen said the intention with Faroese home rule was that it should not be unilaterally changed, as stated in the preamble, so it had that effect. Harhoff, in his 1993 Doctorate dissertation, considered the home rule acts of the Faroe Islands and Greenland to be somewhere in between the constitution and a usual act by the Folketing, as it had been treated as such.

=== Proposed Greenlandic independence ===
The Greenlandic self rule act of 2009 gives Greenland a way to achieve independence. First, the Greenlandic people must make the decision, after which there should be negotiations between the Greenlandic government (Naalakkersuisut) and the Danish government about how to practically implement it. The agreement reached needs to be ratified by Inatsisartut, and approved in a referendum in Greenland. It also needs consent from the Folketing, in accordance with section 19 of the Danish constitution. That section states that any changes to the Kingdom's territory needs to be approved by the Folketing. Greenlandic independence does not require a constitutional change; instead, if Greenland were to become independent, the rules in the constitution regarding Greenland would become void.

With regard to international law, Denmark signed the Indigenous and Tribal Peoples Convention in 1996 and acknowledged the Greenlandic Inuit as an Indigenous people. In the 2009 self rule act, Denmark recognised the Greenlandic people as a "people" within the context of international law, and their inherent right to self-determination.

== Devolved powers ==
The Kingdom of Denmark constitutes a unified sovereign state, with equal status between its constituent parts. Devolution differs from federalism in that the devolved powers of the subnational authority ultimately reside in central government, thus the state remains de jure unitary.

The Self-Government Arrangements devolves political competence and responsibility from the Danish political authorities to the Faroese and the Greenlandic political authorities. The Faroese and Greenlandic authorities administer the tasks taken over from the state, enact legislation in these specific fields and have the economic responsibility for solving these tasks. The Danish government provides an annual grant to the Faroese and the Greenlandic authorities to cover the costs of these devolved areas.

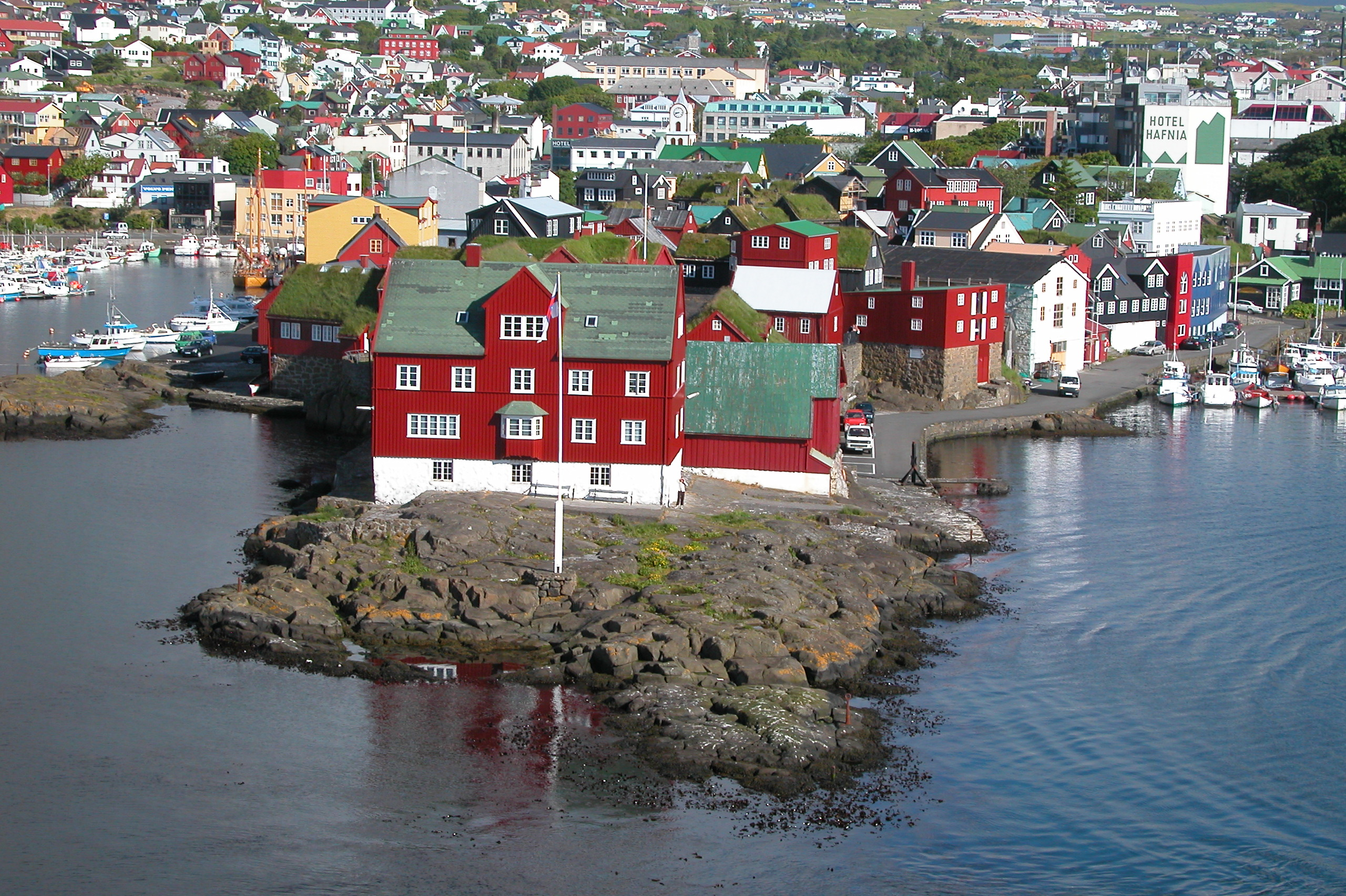
Tinganes, in the capital Thorshavn, is the location of the Faroese Home Government.

The 1948 "Home Rule Act of the Faroe Islands" sets out the terms of Faroese home rule. The Act states, "...the Faroe Islands shall constitute a self-governing community within the State of Denmark." It establishes the home government of the Faroe Islands (Landsstýrið) and the Faroese parliament, the Løgting. More significantly, the Act specifies the powers devolved from the Government of Denmark, including: local government and municipal affairs; taxation, at a local and territorial level; public services, including police and town planning; welfare services, such as housing; primary and secondary education; Archives, libraries, museums; agriculture and fishing; entertainment; among other areas. The Faroe Islands were previously administered as a Danish county (amt); the Home Rule Act abolished the post of Amtmand (County Governor) and replaced it with the role of Rigsombudsmand (High Commissioner of the Danish government). These powers were expanded in a 2005 Act, which named the Faroese home government as an "equal partner" with the Danish government.

The 1978 "Greenland Home Rule Act" devolves powers in much the same way as the Faroese Home Rule Act. It sets out a home rule government and Greenlandic parliament. Specific areas of governance specified in the act include: Organization of local government; Fishing and agriculture; Welfare system; protection of the environment; other areas affecting Greenlanders directly, etc.

On 21 June 2009, Greenland assumed self-determination with responsibility for self-government of judicial affairs, policing, natural resources, immigration and border controls. Also, Greenlanders were recognised as a separate people under international law. Greenland has "self rule", with its home government exercising a wider range of powers.

There are a number of matters that can not be acquired by the territories; Constitutional affairs, foreign policy, defence, the Supreme Court, citizenship, and monetary policy. Additionally, the Faroese and Greenlandic parliaments are subordinate to the Danish parliament, where the two territories are represented by two seats each (from a total of 179 seats).

The Faroe Islands have gradually taken control of more and more areas of responsibility according to their Home Rule Act from 1948. The Faroese/Danish act of 2005 states: "This law is based on an agreement between the Governments of the Faroe Islands and Denmark as equal partners."

=== Foreign affairs ===
Previously, most foreign relations were undertaken exclusively by the Government of Denmark on behalf of the entire realm, but more recently the Faroe Islands and Greenland have increased their role in foreign policy. Representatives for both have joined Danish delegations in discussions on some international matters, such as fishing rights. Greenlandic representatives were included in the process of a 2004 treaty between Denmark and the US regarding the Pituffik Space Base (then named Thule Air Base) in northwest Greenland.

The Kingdom of Denmark as a whole is a member of the United Nations, NATO, the OECD and the World Trade Organization. The Faroe Islands and Greenland are associated members of the Nordic Council in their own right as part of Denmark's membership. Although the Kingdom of Denmark is a member of the European Union, both areas have special dispensation and remain outside the EU. Greenland joined the EU as part of Denmark in 1973, but opted to leave in 1985 after Greenlandic home rule was introduced in 1979.

The "Home Rule Act of the Faroe Islands" specifies that a 'Faroese' shall be understood to mean a person who is a "national of Denmark and a resident of the Faroe Islands". The Government of Denmark issues special passports for its citizens living in the Faroe Islands and Greenland with the right to choose a regular Danish passport as well. The Faroese Home Rule Act states that, in Faroese passports, Føroyingur (Faroese) and Føroyar (Faroe Islands) shall be inserted after the words Dansk (Danish) and Danmark (Denmark).

=== Not devolved ===
The provisions for home rule are limited to internal matters only. Neither Greenland nor the Faroe Islands can write laws that concern the relationship with other states, nor laws that apply to the entire Realm; furthermore, the Supreme Court (Danish: Højesteret) in Copenhagen is the final legal instance, and legal matters from Greenland and the Faroe Islands must be prepared for that court, like any Danish matter. Danish currency is also legal tender in Greenland, but not in the Faroes. Denmark is responsible for the military defence of both nations.

== Relationship with the European Union ==
The Kingdom of Denmark is a member state of the European Communities, the predecessor of the European Union, since 1973. In 1982, Greenland voted to leave the Communities after gaining home rule from the Realm of Denmark. The Faroe Islands was never part of the EU, as explicitly asserted by both Rome treaties. The relations of the Faroe Islands with the EU are governed by a Fisheries Agreement (1977) and a Free Trade Agreement (1991, revised 1998). The main reason for remaining outside the EU is disagreements about the Common Fisheries Policy.

== Terminology ==
Hjemmestyre
Meaning "home rule", it indicates an autonomous administration (present in both in Greenland and the Faroe Islands) that has power over many internal affairs. In this arrangement, the Danish government deals with external matters such as defence and foreign affairs. Greenland and the Faroe Islands maintain their own elected assemblies and administrations, headed by a premier who appoints a cabinet. This is synonymous with "self-governing".

Selvstyre
Following a referendum on 25 November 2008 (the 30th anniversary of the establishment of home rule in Greenland), the relationship between the Danish and Greenlandic governments changed, with Greenland gaining greater autonomy. Further powers were granted to the Greenlandic government on 21 June 2009, including control of the police force, coastguard, and courts. Additionally, Greenland receives fewer Danish subsidies, becoming more self-sufficient. As a result of these changes, Greenland is said to have self rule with minimal support from Denmark, as opposed to "home rule".

Rigsombudsmand
High Commissioners represent the interests of Denmark in the Faroe Islands and Greenland. There is one Danish High Commissioner in each territory. The commissioner can attend the meetings at the Løgting in the Faroes and at the Inatsisartut in Greenland, but can not vote.

Folketingsmedlemmer fra Færøerne og Grønland
Members of the Folketing from the Faroe Islands and Greenland: Greenland and the Faroe Islands and their self-rule administrations take part in consultations on policies and decisions affecting their region, including negotiations with the devolved legislatures and the Danish parliament (folketing). Greenland and the Faroe Islands have two members of the Danish folketing each, with full voting privileges.

== See also ==
- Kingdom of the Netherlands
- Realm of New Zealand

== Literature ==
- Adriansen, Inge (2003): Nationale symboler i Det Danske Rige 1830–2000, Vol I (Fra fyrstestat til nationalstater), Museum Tusculanum Press, University of Copenhagen. (in Danish)
- Adriansen, Inge (2003): Nationale symboler i Det Danske Rige 1830–2000, Vol II (Fra undersåtter til nation), Museum Tusculanum Press, University of Copenhagen. (in Danish)

== Sources ==
- The Danish Constitution for the Danish Realm: Danmarks Riges Grundlov, no. 169 of 5 June 1953. (in Danish)
