= 1979 Greenlandic home rule referendum =

- 17 January 1979
- Home Rule in Greenland

Results
Choice	Votes	%
Yes	12,756	73.06%
No	4,703	26.94%
Valid votes	17,459	95.92%
Invalid or blank votes	743	4.08%
Total votes	18,202	100.00%
Registered voters/turnout	28,889	63.01%

A consultative referendum on home rule was held in Greenland on 17 January 1979. Just over 70% of voters voted in favour of greater autonomy from Denmark, leading to the establishment of a Greenlandic parliament and Greenland gaining sovereignty in areas such as education, health, fisheries and the environment.

As a result of the referendum, home rule came into effect on 1 May 1979 and Greenland became an autonomous constituent country of the Kingdom of Denmark.

== Background ==
The Colony of Greenland was turned into the County of Greenland in 1953. Greenland had legislative bodies, but they were purely consultative.

Denmark overall voted to join the European Economic Community (EEC) after a 1972 referendum, but the majority of Greenland voted against it. However, Greenland had to join the EEC as well. Greenlandic self-determination grew after the referendum and Siumut was formed.

Denmark permitted offshore oil drilling in Greenland from 1973 to 1977 without seeking approval from the Greenland Provincial Council. The council unanimously passed a resolution in 1975 stating that the land and resources of Greenland belonged to the people living there.

Three years of negotiations were conducted by the Danish-Greenlandic Home Rule Commission from 1975 to 1978. The commission had fourteen members, seven Danish and seven Greenlandic members, and was chaired by a Dane appointed by the Minister for Greeland. The Home Rule Act and the Law of Mineral Resources in Greenland was passed by the Folketing in November 1978 after being recommended by the commission.

== Results ==
Choice	Votes	%
For	12,756	73.06
Against	4,703	26.94
Total	17,459	100.00
Valid votes	17,459	95.92
Invalid/blank votes	743	4.08
Total votes	18,202	100.00
Registered voters/turnout	28,889	63.01
Source: Folketingsårbog 1978–79

== Aftermath ==
The first election for the Inatsisartut, which was created after home rule, was held in 1979, and won by Siumut. Greenland left the EEC in 1985.

== Works cited ==
- Dahl, Jens (1986). "Greenland: Political Structure of Self-Government". Arctic Anthropology. 23 (1). University of Wisconsin Press: 315–324. doi:10.2307/40316118. JSTOR 40316118.
- Lyck, Lise; Taagholt, Jørgen (1987). "Greenland — Its Economy and Resources". Arctic. 40 (1). Arctic Institute of North America: 50–59. doi:10.2307/40510564. JSTOR 40510564.
