= Danish Royal Trade Monopoly in the Faroe Islands =

The Danish Royal Trade Monopoly (Faroese: kongligi einahandilin; Danish: Kongelige Færøske Handel) oversaw all trade between the Faroe Islands and other regions from 1709 to 1856.

== History ==
Beginning in 1662, the Danish nobleman Christoffer Gabel and his heirs held exclusive rights over the Faroe Islands, including trading rights, but in 1709 the Danish Royal Exchequer assumed control of the trade monopoly on behalf of King Frederick IV. The new royal trade monopoly worked to address local concerns that had lingered under the Gabels and worked to eliminate smuggling.

The monopoly was strict, and reportedly one could receive "severe punishment if he rowed out to a visiting Dutch ship to trade off some woolen socks against a handful of flour."

Beginning in 1771, as the king adjusted the administration of the Faroes, the scope of the royal trade monopoly also changed. In 1774 it was combined with the Finnmark and Iceland trade, and in 1781 trade with Greenland was added to the monopoly. By 1791, however, the royal trade monopoly for the Faroe Islands was again made a standalone entity.

From 1723 to 1777, the monopoly ran a profit for the king, but the market for exported Faroese stockings could not offset the rising price of imported grain and by 1789 Copenhagen was looking to abolish the royal trading monopoly. Faroese farmers successfully petitioned for the retention of the monopoly through 1796. However, broader European politics forestalled the abolishment of the monopoly.

Initially, the monopoly operated a single store in Tórshavn, but during the 1830s, it added additional stores in the villages of Vestmanna, Tvøroyri and Klaksvík.

Following signing of the Treaty of Kiel, Denmark retained control of the Faroes and the royal trade monopoly continued to subsidize the Faroese economy, which remained heavily dependent upon wool exports. However by the time the Løgting was reestablished in 1851, rising Faroese national identity and a shift to fishing as the islands' prime commodity lead to the dissolution of the royal trade monopoly in 1856.

== See also ==
- Danish trade monopoly in Greenland
- Danish trade monopoly in Iceland
