= Telephone numbers in the Faroe Islands =

Telephone numbers in Faroe Islands
- Location of Faroe Islands
- Country: Faroe Islands
- Continent: Europe
- Format: +298 NX XX XX
- Country code: +298
- International access: 00

Telephone numbers in the Faroe Islands have used a closed numbering plan, with 6-digit subscriber numbers, since 1998. Numbers are usually printed in three groups of two digits; for example, Tórshavn municipality's city hall has the telephone number 30 20 10.

Unusually for countries in Europe, the International Telecommunication Union assigned to the Faroe Islands a country calling code beginning with the digit "2", usually allocated to countries in Africa. At the time, all country codes beginning with "3" and "4", reserved for countries in Europe, were already in use. Originally, telephone numbers in the Faroe Islands could be reached using the country code for Denmark, +45, followed by the area code 42.

Calls to Denmark require the use of the international access code 00 and country code 45; previously, only the digit 0 was required before the subscriber's eight-digit number, with calls to the rest of the world using the international access code 009 and the country code.

== Allocations ==
Number range	Usage
12xx	SMS/MMS short codes
19xx	SMS/MMS short codes
20 xx xx	Fixed Network
21 xx xx–29 xx xx	GSM Mobile
3x xx xx	Fixed Network
4x xx xx	Fixed Network
5x xx xx	GSM Mobile
6x xx xx	Fixed Network (including VoIP)
70 xx xx	Shared Cost Numbers
71 xx xx–79 xx xx	GSM Mobile
80 xx xx	Freephone numbers
81 xx xx–89 xx xx	Fixed Network (including VoIP)
90 xx xx	Premium rate numbers
91 xx xx–99 xx xx	Mobile (reserved for 3G)

== Special Numbers ==
Number range	Owner	Usage
112	Faroese Telecom	Neyðarkall / Emergency
114	Faroese Telecom	Løgreglan / Police (non-emergency)
118	Faroese Telecom	Nummarupplýsing / Number Information
