= Coat of arms of Greenland =

- Armiger: Greenland
- Adopted: 1 May 1989; 36 years ago
- Shield: Azure, a polar bear rampant argent

The coat of arms of Greenland is a blue shield charged with an upright polar bear. This symbol was first introduced in the coat of arms of Denmark in 1666 and it is still represented in the arms of the Danish royal family. In a Danish context, the bear was originally shown walking naturally, but an upright position was specified in 1819. The 1470 London Roll shows an arms captioned Le Roy de Greneland featuring a shield depicting a polar bear surrounded by three birds. This royal title did not reflect any official title, but merely that the arms could be used by anyone controlling Greenland.

The current coat of arms was designed by Greenlandic artist Jens Rosing and adopted on 1 May 1989 by the Landsting. The polar bear symbolizes the fauna of Greenland and the blue (azure) colour designates the Atlantic and the Arctic Ocean Greenland is washed by. Instead of the Danish version in the royal arms which follows the heraldic tradition in raising the right forepaw, the polar bear on the Greenlandic coat of arms raises the left forepaw, due to the traditional Inuit belief that polar bears are left-handed. A similar arms is used by the official Danish government representative in Greenland. In this case, the bear raises its right paw, and the shield is crowned with the royal crown.

The official Danish specification of the arms does not specify which forepaw is raised, so there is no conflict between the different versions. The adherents of the full independence of Greenland use a green background.

A blazon in heraldic terms is: Azure, a polar bear rampant argent.

The polar bear was first included as a symbol of Greenland in the Danish coat of arms during the reign of King Frederik III of Denmark, but did not gain widespread use on its own until the early 20th century.

== Gallery ==
Coat of arms of Greenland (old version)

Coat of arms of the County of Greenland (abolished 1 May 1979)
