= Greenlandic rigsdaler =

Historic currency of Greenland

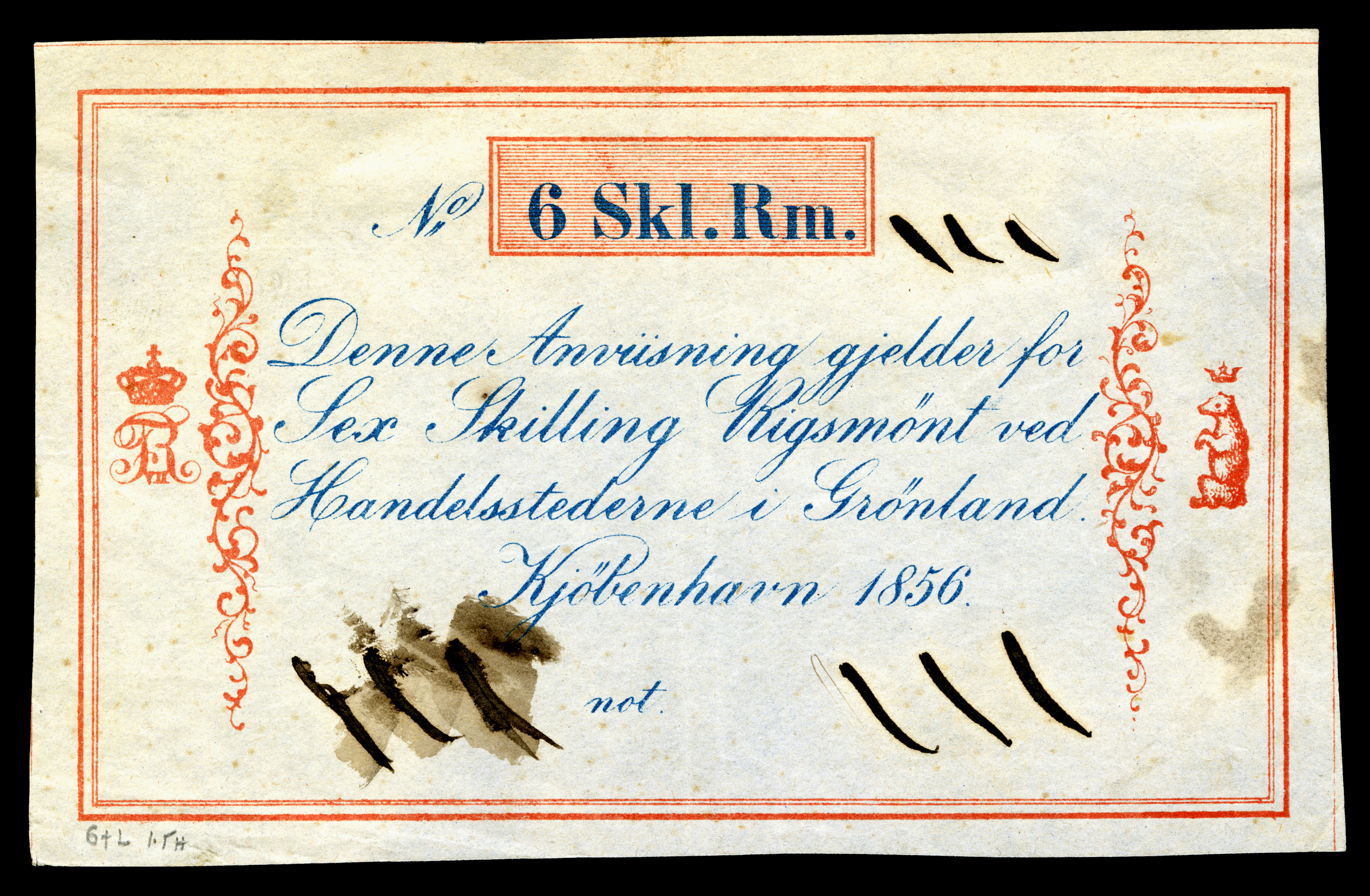
Greenland, 6 skilling rigsmønt (1856), the only year this denomination was used. Unsigned remainder.

The rigsdaler was the currency of Greenland until 1874. It was equal to the Danish rigsdaler which circulated in Greenland alongside distinct banknotes from 1803.

== History ==
Before 1813, the rigsdaler courant was subdivided into 96 skilling. In 1813, the rigsdaler courant was replaced by the rigsbanksdaler at a rate of 6 rigsdaler courant = 1 rigsbanksdaler, with the rigsbanksdaler subdivided into 96 rigsbank skilling. In 1854, the names were changed to the rigsdaler and skilling rigsmønt. In 1874, the kroner was introduced, at a rate of 2 kroner = 1 rigsdaler. See Danish rigsdaler for a more detailed history.

== Banknotes ==
In 1803, the Kongelige grønlandske Handel introduced notes in denominations of 12 and 24 skilling, 1/2 and 1 rigsdaler courant. The next year, the Handelsstederne i Grønland took over the issuance of paper money and introduced notes for 6 and 12 skilling, 1/4, 1/2, 1 and 5 rigsdaler courant.

In 1819, following the currency reform, notes were introduced in denominations of 6, 12 and 24 skilling and 1 rigsbankdaler. These were replaced in 1856 by notes for the same amounts but in the new denominations of skilling rigsmønt and rigsdaler.

== See also ==
- Economy of Greenland
