= Royal Greenland Trading Department =

Danish state enterprise

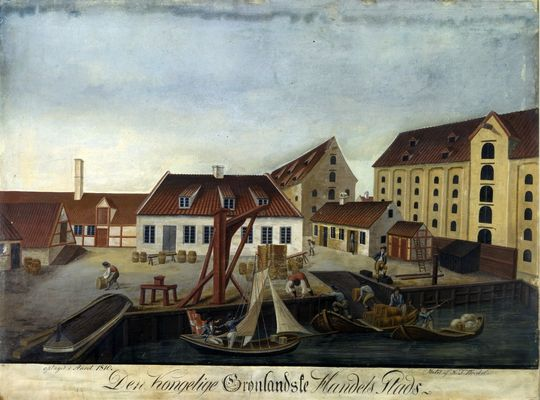
The Royal Greenland Dock at Christianshavn in Copenhagen in 1810, painting by N. I. Bredal

The Royal Greenland Trading Department (Danish: Den Kongelige Grønlandske Handel, KGH) was a Danish state enterprise charged with administering the realm's settlements and trade in Greenland. The company managed the government of Greenland from 1774 to 1908 through its Board of Managers in Copenhagen and a series of Royal Inspectors and Governors in Godthaab and Godhavn on Greenland. The company was headquartered at Grønlandske Handels Plads at Christianshavn.

Following the introduction of home rule in Greenland in 1979, the company was reformed into several successors, including the KNI conglomerate, the Royal Greenland fishing company, and the Royal Arctic shipping company.

== History ==
The Royal Greenland Trading Department was founded in 1774 as a successor to the failed General Trade Company (Det almindelige Handelskompagni) which had previously managed the Dano-Norwegian whaling stations and Lutheran and Moravian missions in Greenland.

At first, it possessed a monopoly on trade near the Danish trading stations and missions but, in 1776, this was expanded to a monopoly on all trade in Greenland whatsoever between the 60th and 73d parallels north. The change in protection led to a sharp downturn in new settlements and, after a brief abortive attempt to manage a government-owned Scandinavian whaling fleet, led the company to focus on trade with the local Inuit hunters. The Instruction of 1782 divided the colony into northern and southern halves, forbade senior management from intermarriage with Inuit or racially mixed women and lower-ranking employees from intermarriage with Inuit or European women, and banned further attempts to urbanize the Inuit or alter their traditional way of life through improved employment opportunities or sales of luxury items. Large premiums were charged on goods such as sugar and coffee in order to prevent the Inuit from 'softening' and abandoning their demanding work.

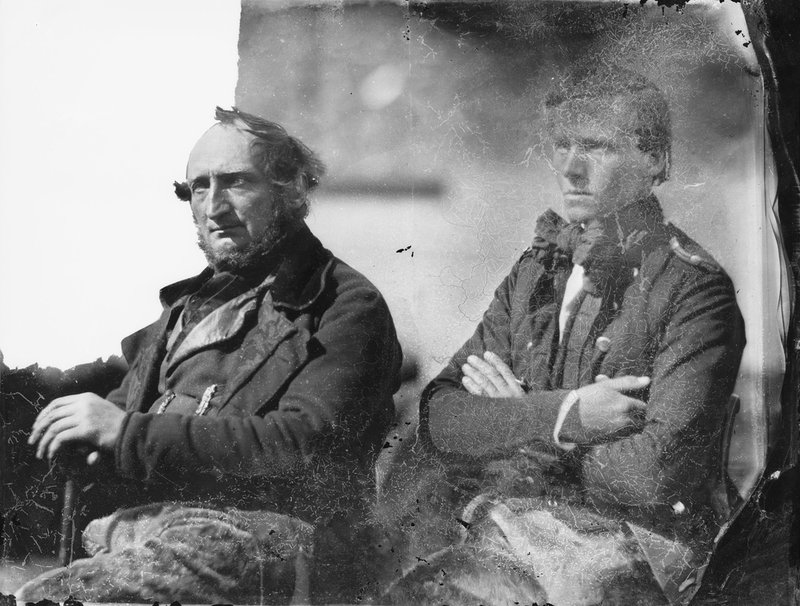
Two members of the Royal Greenland Trade Company, 1854

Repeated attempts to end the department's monopoly on trade were defeated, notably by an impassioned defense of the company's practices by its director Hinrich Rink, but local councils were established in 1857 with authority over one-fifth of each station's profits and the valuable trade in cryolite extracted from Ivigtut was granted to a different company in 1864. In 1908, the Ministry of the Interior took over general administration and, in 1912, the entire trading operation was brought under its supervision as well.

== Fleet ==
The Royal Greenland Trading Department began with a gift of three ships from the king: the large frigate Kongens Gave ("King's Gift"), the smaller frigate Holsteinsborg, and the galiot Den Gloende. In 1776, its fleet consisted of the Bernstorff, the Eichsted, the Godthaab, the Holsteinsborg, the Island, the Kongenshaab, the Krag Juul Wind, the Lovisenborg, the Mariakirke, the Sankt Croix, the Sankt Peter, the Schack Rathlau, the Schimmelmann, Skatmester, the Strat Davis, and the Taasinge Slot. The next year, only 10 vessels returned: the Bernstorff, the Eichsted, the Gregers Juul, the Guldberg, the Holsteinsborg, the Kongenshaab, the Krag Juul Wind, the Schack Rathlau, the Schack, and the Schimmelmann, Skatmester.

In 1781, a royal order granted a number of privileges to crew members of the Royal Greenland fleet. They were made exempt from regular military service except for times of utter need. Furthermore, crew members were freed from any civil obligations, which included tax-free trading for personal provisioning before and after a voyage and a deferral of heritage fees for the families of crew members deceased during a voyage.

The Department began purchasing its own trading vessels again in 1790. Ships operated by the trading department included the Mariane, Tjalfe, Godthaab, Gertrud Rask, Gustav Holm, and Ceres. From 1792, the armed vessel Dorothea served as a coastal patrol in northern Greenland in order to prevent illegal trading between the Inuit and foreign ships and to discourage whaling by other nations in the area. The department also operated the commercial whaler s/s Sonja between 1924 and 1958, with a six-year hiatus during World War II.

== Disestablishment ==
The company's monopoly was finally ended in 1950, as the two halves of Greenland were reunited in preparation for the island's full integration with the Kingdom of Denmark, which occurred in 1953. The Home Rule Government was introduced in 1979 and gained control of the company in 1986, renaming it Kalaallit Niuerfiat (Kalallisut: "Greenland Trade"). In 1992, it was reorganized into the KNI conglomerate. The Royal Greenland fishing company was spun off in 1990, the Royal Arctic Line shipping company in 1993, and the Pisiffik retail chain in 2001.

== See also ==
- Danish colonization of Greenland
- List of inspectors of Greenland
  - Hinrich Rink
- List of trading companies
- KNI
- Royal Arctic Line
- Danish trade monopoly in the Faroe Islands
- Danish trade monopoly in Iceland
