= Hans Lassen =

Governor of Greenland from 1973 to 1979

Hans J. Lassen

4th Governor of Greenland
- In office 1973–1979
- Preceded by: Niels Otto Christensen
- Succeeded by: Jonathan Motzfeldt as Prime Minister

Personal details
- Born: 16 August 1926 Gevninge Sogn, Zealand, Denmark
- Died: 8 December 2011 (aged 85)
- Occupation: Lawyer, civil servant

Hans J. Lassen (1926–2011) was the last Danish Governor of Greenland from 1973 to 1979, when home rule was established.

He was a knight of the Order of the Dannebrog.
