= List of governors of Greenland =

Governor of Greenland
- Precursor: Inspectors of Greenland
- Formation: 1925
- First holder: Philip R. Rosendahl (North); Knud Oldendow (South)
- Final holder: Hans Lassen
- Abolished: 1 May 1979
- Succession: Prime Minister of Greenland

This is a list of governors of Greenland. The position was established, after the positions of inspectors of Greenland was abolished. In 1950, the two governors (Danish: landsfogeder) were collected into the Governor of all of Greenland (Danish: landshøvding). The position was abolished in 1979, following Greenland's gain of home rule.

== List of officeholders ==
=== Superintendent of Greenland (1728–1730) ===
No.	Name (birth–death)	Term of office			Ref.
No.	Name (birth–death)	Took office	Left office	Time in office	Ref.
1	Major; Claus Paarss (1683–1762)	1728	1730	1–2 years	

=== Governor of North Greenland (1925–1950) ===
Nordgrønlands landsfoged

No.	Name (birth–death)	Term of office			Ref.
No.	Name (birth–death)	Took office	Left office	Time in office	Ref.
1	Philip R. Rosendahl (1810–1988)	1925	1928	2–3 years	
–	Jørgen Berthelsen (1895–1989); Acting	1928	1929	0–1 years	
(1)	Philip R. Rosendahl (1810–1988)	1929	1939	9–10 years	
2	Eske Brun (1904–1987)	1939	1945	5–6 years	
–	Carl Frederik Bistrup Simony (1909–1983); Acting	1945	1947	1–2 years	
–	Niels Otto Christensen (1917–2003); Acting	1947	1950	2–3 years	

=== Governor of South Greenland (1925–1950) ===
Sydgrønlands landsfoged

No.	Name (birth–death)	Term of office			Ref.
No.	Name (birth–death)	Took office	Left office	Time in office	Ref.
1	Knud Oldendow (1892–1975)	1925	1932	6–7 years	
2	Aksel Svane (1898–1991)	1932	1941	8–9 years	
–	Eske Brun (1904–1987); Acting	1941	1945	3–4 years	
3	Carl Frederik Bistrup Simony (1909–1983)	1945	1950	4–5 years	

=== Governor of Greenland (1950–1979) ===
Grønlands landshøvding

No.	Name (birth–death)	Term of office			Ref.
No.	Name (birth–death)	Took office	Left office	Time in office	Ref.
1	Poul Hugo Lundsteen (1910–1988)	1950	1960	9–10 years	
–	Finn C. Nielsen (1913–1995); Acting	1960	1963	2–3 years	
3	Niels Otto Christensen (1917–2003)	1963	1973	9–10 years	
4	Hans Lassen (1926–2011)	1973	1979	5–6 years	

== See also ==
- List of inspectors of Greenland, for colonial administrators before 1924
- First Minister of Greenland, for administrators after the institution of Home Rule in 1979
- List of Danish High Commissioners in Greenland
