= South Greenland =

Danish inspectorate

Southern Inspectorate of Greenland Sydgrønlands Inspektorat
- Colony of Denmark–Norway (1782–1814); Colony of Denmark (1814–1950)
- 1782–1950
- Flag of Denmark Coat of arms

- South Greenland (dark green) in 1815
- Capital: Godthåb
- Government
  - Type: Monarchy
- Monarch
  - 1782–1808: Christian VII first
  - 1947–1950: Frederik IX last
- Governor/Royal inspectors
  - 1782–1789: Bendt Olrik first
  - 1945–1950: Carl Fredrik Simony last
- History
  - Established: 1782
  - Disestablished: 1950
Succeeded by
Colony of Greenland
- Today part of: Kingdom of Denmark: Greenland

The Southern Inspectorate of Greenland (Danish: Sydgrønlands Inspektorat), also known as South Greenland, was a Danish inspectorate on Greenland consisting of the trading centres and missionary stations along the southwest coast of the vast island.

== History ==
West Greenland was divided into the Southern Inspectorate and the Northern Inspectorate (North Greenland) from 1782. The boundary between the two ran at around 68°N latitude. The Southern Inspectorate's northernmost town was Holstensborg, now Sisimiut, south of Egedesminde, now Aasiaat, which was the southernmost town of North Greenland. The Southern Inspectorate extended southwards to 59°30'N, or to the southernmost point of Greenland. The capital was at Godthåb (modern Nuuk).

In 1911, as the administration of the colony was removed from the Royal Greenland Trading Department (KGH) and folded into the Danish Ministry of the Interior, a provincial council (Danish: landsråd) was established. It was elected indirectly from the local councils and had little say in the management of the colony.

South Greenland and North Greenland were merged as the Colony of Greenland in 1950, with the administration centralised at Godthåb.

== See also ==
- List of inspectors of Greenland, for the chief officers of the colony from 1782 to 1924
- List of governors of South Greenland, for the chief officers of the colony from 1924 to 1950
