= North Greenland =

Danish colony (1782–1950)

Northern Inspectorate of Greenland Nordgrønlands Inspektorat
- Colony of Denmark–Norway (1782–1814); Colony of Denmark (1814–1950)
- 1782–1950
- Flag of Denmark Coat of arms

- North Greenland (dark green) in 1815
- Capital: Godhavn
- Government
  - Type: Monarchy
- Monarch
  - 1782–1808: Christian VII first
  - 1947–1950: Frederik IX last
- Governor/Royal inspectors
  - 1782–1786: Johan Friedrich Schwabe first
  - 1945–1950: Carl Fredrik Simony last
- History
  - Established: 1782
  - Disestablished: 1950
Succeeded by
Colony of Greenland
- Today part of: Kingdom of Denmark: Greenland

The Northern Inspectorate of Greenland (Danish: Nordgrønlands Inspektorat), also known as North Greenland, was a Danish inspectorate on Greenland consisting of the trading centres and missionary stations along the northwest coast of the vast island.

== History ==
West Greenland was divided into the Northern Inspectorate and the Southern Inspectorate (South Greenland) from 1782. The boundary between the two ran at around 68°N latitude. The Northern Inspectorate's southernmost town was Egedesminde, now Aasiaat, north of Holstensborg, now Sisimiut, which was the northernmost town of South Greenland. The Northern Inspectorate extended northwards up to and including Upernavik, or, according to Bell (1831), to 78°N to enclose Thule. The capital was at Godhavn (modern Qeqertarsuaq).

In 1911, as the administration of the colony was removed from the Royal Greenland Trading Department (KGH) and folded into the Danish Ministry of the Interior, a provincial council (Danish: landsråd) was established. It was elected indirectly from the local councils and had little say in the management of the colony.

North Greenland and South Greenland were merged as the Colony of Greenland in 1950, with the administration centralised at Godthåb (modern Nuuk), formerly South Greenland's capital.

== See also ==
- List of inspectors of Greenland, for the chief officers of the colony from 1782 to 1924
- List of governors of North Greenland, for the chief officers of the colony from 1924 to 1950
- Avannaa County, a former administrative division also known as "North Greenland"
