= Narsarmijit, Greenland =

Narsarmijit Frederiksthal
- Settlement
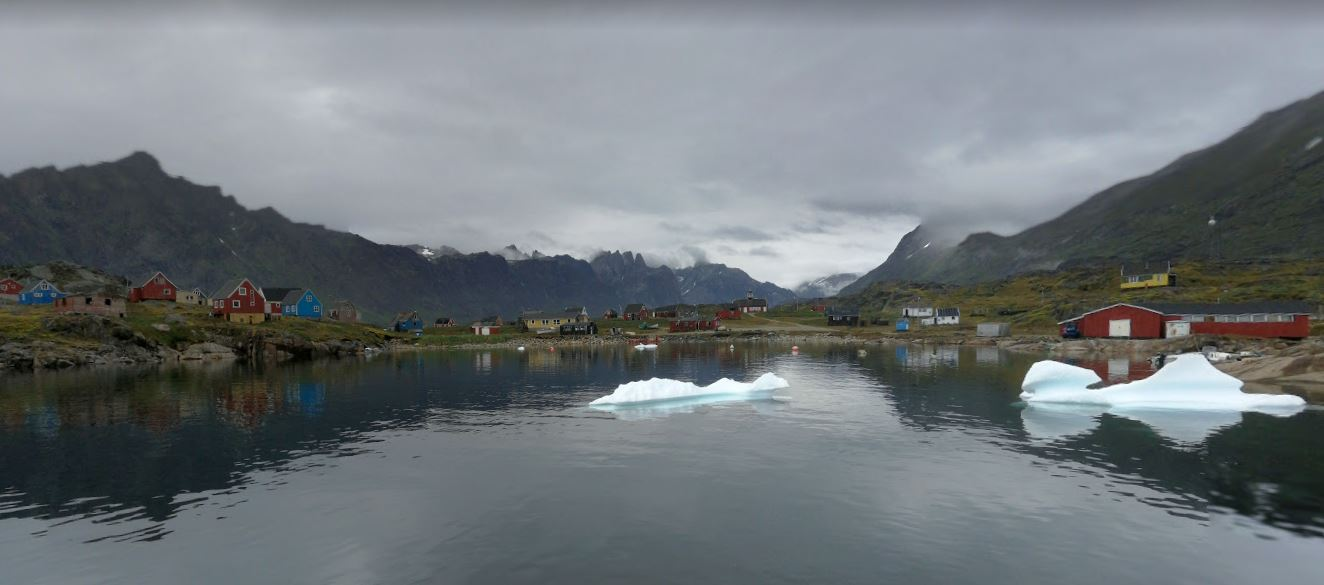
- View of the settlement

- Location in Greenland
- Coordinates: 60°00′17″N 44°39′55″W
- State: Kingdom of Denmark
- Constituent country: Greenland
- Municipality: Kujalleq

Government
  - Mayor: Augo Simonsen

Population (2025)
  - Total: 55
- Time zone: UTC−02:00 (WGT)
  - Summer (DST): UTC−01:00 (WGST)
- Postal code: 3922 Nanortalik

Narsarmijit, formerly Narsaq Kujalleq and Frederiksdal (Anglicised: Frederiksthal), is a settlement in southern Greenland. It is located in the Kujalleq municipality near Cape Thorvaldsen. Its population was 62 in 2024. There has been a slow but steady pattern of emigration since the late 1950s.

== Geography ==
Narsarmijit is the southernmost settlement in the country, located approximately 50 kilometers (31 mi) north of Cape Farewell, the southern cape of Greenland.

== History ==
The city is located in the area of the easternmost of the Norse settlements during their colonization of Greenland. The former village of Ikigait is roughly 3 kilometers (1.9 mi) away and was the site of Herjólfr Bárðarson's farm Herjolfsnes ("Herjolf's Point").

The Moravian missionary Conrad Kleinschmidt (1768–1832) founded the station of Friedrichsthal (Danish: Frederiksdal, lit. "Frederick's Valley") in 1824. The name honored Frederick VI of Denmark. The station was the Moravian's fourth, after Neu-Herrnhut (1733), Lichtenfels (1748), and Lichtenau (1774) and before Umanak (1861) and Idlorpait (1864). All the Greenland missions were surrendered to the Lutheran church in 1900. In the 19th century, the area served as a prime territory for sealing. Members of the settlement rescued the survivors of the ill-fated German polar expedition's Hansa in 1870. In 1906, pastor Jens Chemnitz founded Greenland's first sheep farm in Narsarmijit; the industry has since moved north to the larger pastures around Narsaq.

Until 31 December 2008 the settlement belonged to the Nanortalik municipality. Since the administrative reform enacted on 1 January 2009 the settlement has been part of Kujalleq.

== Transport ==
The village is served by the Narsarmijit Heliport. Air Greenland district helicopters link the settlement with Nanortalik, and further to Qaqortoq and Narsarsuaq.

== Population ==
Most towns and settlements in southern Greenland exhibit negative growth patterns over the last two decades, with many settlements rapidly depopulating. The population of Narsarmijit has decreased nearly a half relative to the 1990 levels, by nearly a quarter relative to the 2000 levels.

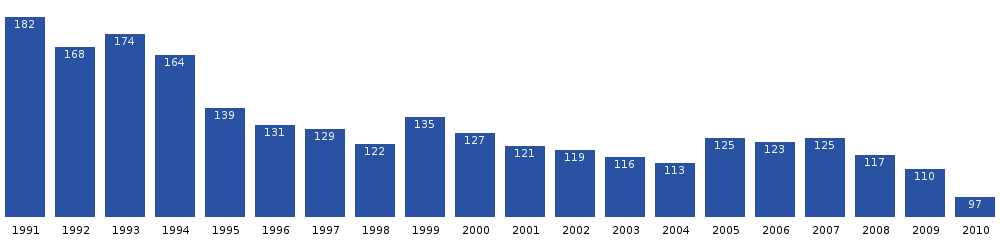
Narsarmijit population growth dynamics in the last two decades. Source: Statistics Greenland
