= Samuel Kleinschmidt =

German/Danish missionary linguist

Samuel Petrus Kleinschmidt
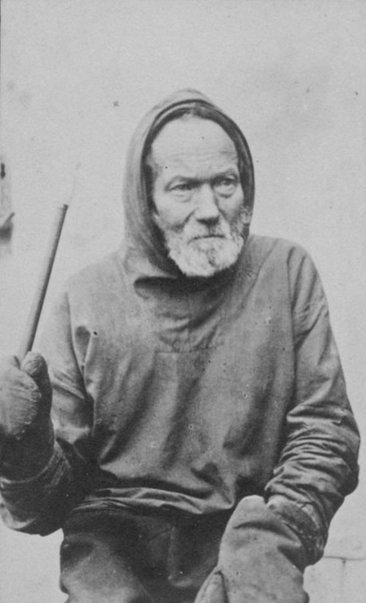
- Kleinschmidt, photograph by J. A. D. Jensen, c. 1885
- Born: 27 February 1814; Lichtenau, Greenland (present-day Alluitsoq)
- Died: 9 February 1886 (aged 71); Neu-Herrnhut (present-day Nuuk), Greenland
- Occupations: missionary linguist; teacher
- Known for: Developing the standard orthography of the Greenlandic language, used from 1851 to 1973
- Notable work: Grammatik der grönländischen Sprache (1851); Nunalerutit (1858); Den grønlandske ordbog (1871)
- Parent(s): Johann Konrad Kleinschmidt; Christina Petersen

Samuel Petrus Kleinschmidt (27 February 1814 – 9 February 1886) was a German/Danish missionary linguist born in Greenland known for having written extensively about the Greenlandic language and having invented the orthography used for writing this language from 1851 to 1973. He also translated parts of the Bible into Greenlandic.

== Life ==
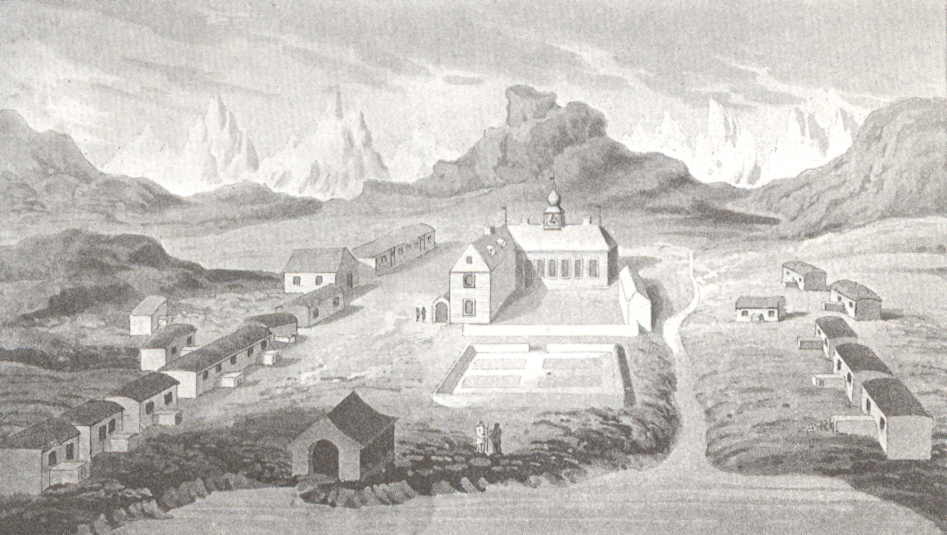
Neu-Herrnhut / Ny Herrnhut (Old Nuuk) around 1770

He was born in the rectory of Lichtenau in southern Greenland (present-day Alluitsoq) to a couple of Moravian missionaries, Johann Konrad Kleinschmidt (1768–1832) from Oberdorla in Thuringia, Germany, and Christina Petersen (1780–1853) from Trudsø, now a part of Struer, Denmark. As a youth, he went to school in Kleinwelke, Saxony, in Germany and subsequently for an apprenticeship to a pharmacy in Zeist, Netherlands, studying during that period Latin, Greek, and Hebrew, as well as Dutch, French, and English, all the while retaining his childhood languages, Danish, German, and Greenlandic. In 1837 he went to Christiansfeld in Denmark working there for a couple of years as a teacher. Subsequently, he returned to Greenland in 1841. After two years he held his first sermon in Greenlandic, speaking it fluently and plainly rather than using old worn-out idioms of the previous ministers. From 1846 to 1848 he worked as a teacher in Lichtenfels (present-day Akunnat), subsequently moving to Neu-Herrnhut (Old Nuuk).

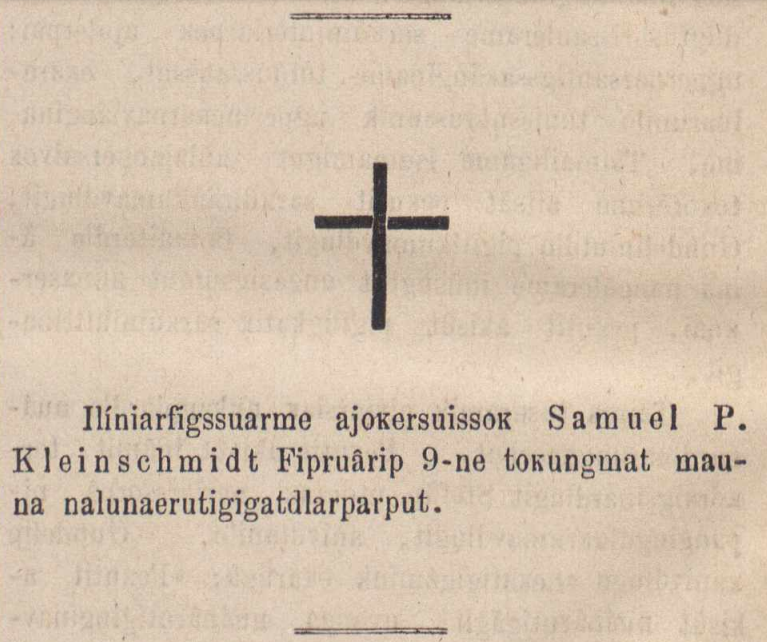
Death notice in Atuagagdliutit

He already finished his grammar of Greenlandic in 1845 and sent it to printing at the University of Berlin but it was not published until 1851. It was exceptional because it did not use the traditional scheme of the Latin grammar to describe its subject, but rather devised a new scheme more suited for the Greenlandic language. This grammar was also the first work to employ the orthography which became the standard in writing Greenlandic until the reform of 1973. In 1859 he left the Moravian church to join the Church of Denmark. For most of his time in Greenland, he served as a teacher rather than a priest. He also translated the better part of the Bible into Greenlandic. He died in 1886 at 72 years of age in Neu-Herrnhut (present-day Noorliit, a part of Nuuk), having spent 54 of them in Greenland.

== Works ==
- 1968 (1851): Grammatik der grönländischen Sprache : mit teilweisem Einschluss des Labradordialekts. Hildesheim: Olms.
- 1858: Nunalerutit, imáipoĸ: silap píssusianik inuinigdlo ilíkarsautíngui (Geography: A little book about the world and mankind). Godthåb/Nuuk: nûngme.
- 1871: Den grønlandske ordbog / omarbeidet af Sam. Kleinschmidt; udgiven paa foranstaltning af Ministeriet for Kirke- og Underviisningsvæsenet og meddet kongelige danske Videnskabernes Selskabs understøttelse ved H.F. Jørgensen. Kjøbenhavn:L. Kleins bogtrykkeri.
