= Qeqertarsuatsiaat =

Settlement in Greenland, Kingdom of Denmark

Qeqertarsuatsiaat Fiskernæs
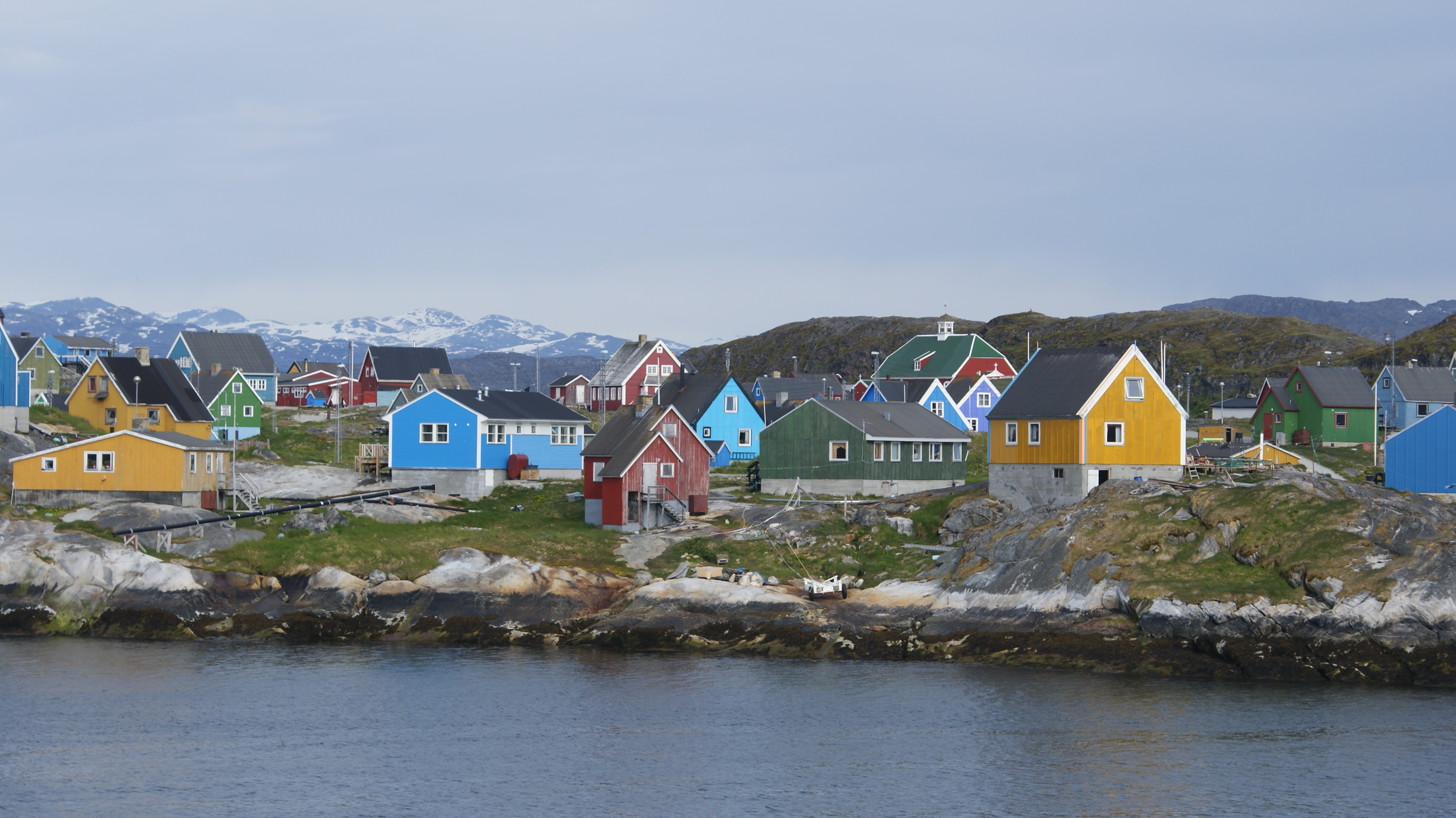
- Qeqertarsuatsiaat

- Location within Greenland
- Coordinates: 63°05′20″N 50°40′40″W
- State: Kingdom of Denmark
- Constituent country: Greenland
- Municipality: Sermersooq
- Founded: 1754

Government
  - Mayor: Avaaraq Olsen

Population (2020)
  - Total: 169
- Time zone: UTC−02:00 (Western Greenland Time)
  - Summer (DST): UTC−01:00 (Western Greenland Summer Time)
- Postal code: 3900 Nuuk

Qeqertarsuatsiaat, also known by its Danish name Fiskernæs (alternatively Fiskenæsset), is a settlement in the Sermersooq municipality in southwestern Greenland, located on an island off the shores of Labrador Sea. Its population was 169 in 2020.

== History ==
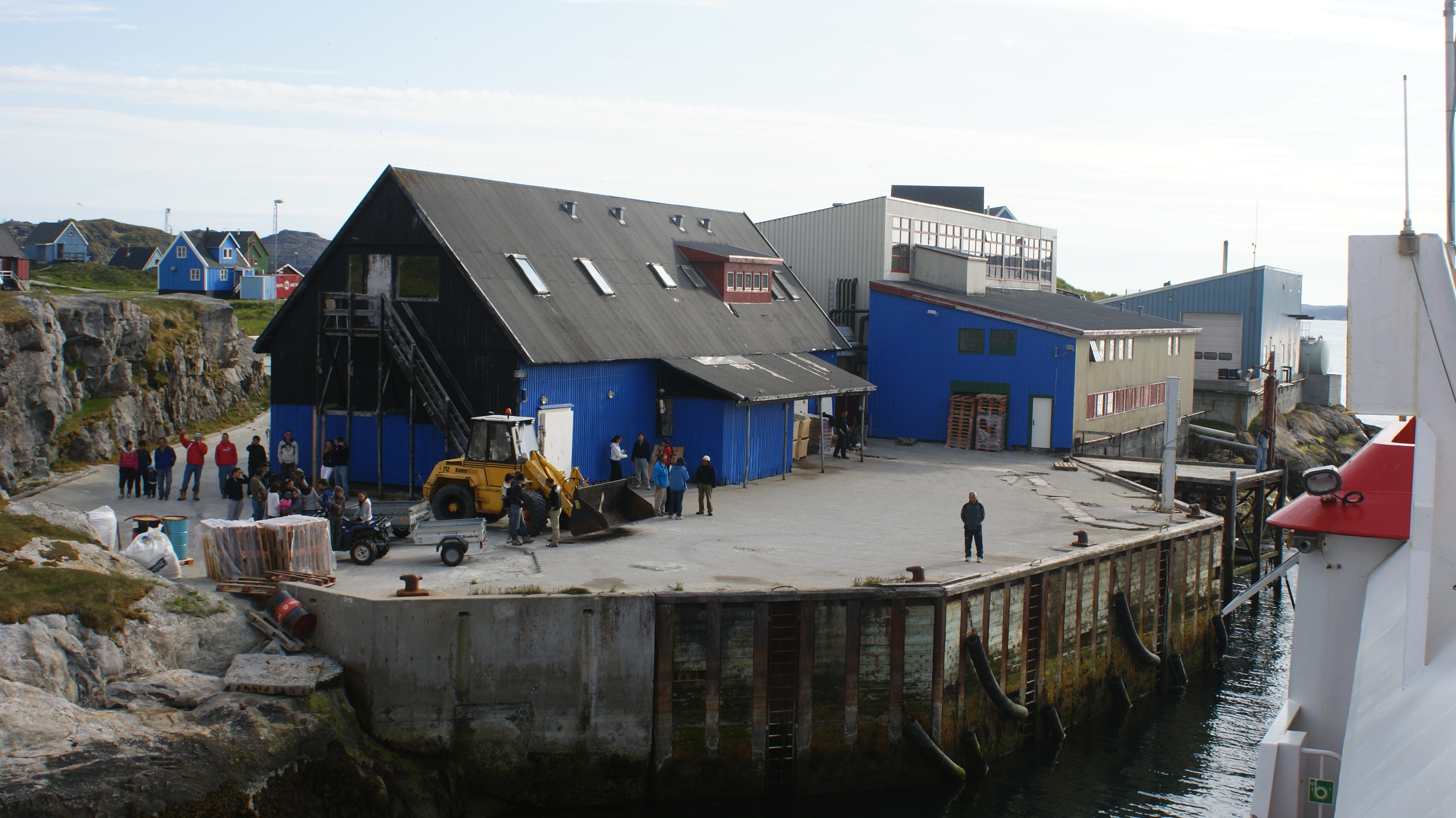
Qeqertarsuatsiaat port

Kikertarsocitsiak or Qeqertarsuatsiaat has long been the local name for the island (Kalaallisut: "Rather Large Islands"). It was first settled by the Danes as Fiskernæs in 1754. The name was often anglicized as Fisher's Inlet.

The trading post was founded by the merchant Anders Olsen on behalf of the Danish General Trade Company, which was granted a royal monopoly on trade in Greenland but only in and around its settlements. Like most Greenlandic trading posts, it was a location for the Danes to trade imported goods for seal skins and seal and whale blubber gathered by Kalaallit in the area. Unusually, the settlement became the early center of Greenland's salmon and cod fisheries and it was as common to see the large "woman's boat" or umiak as the smaller hunting kayaks.

In 1748, 1754, 1757, or 1758, the Moravian mission of Lichtenfels was established in another inlet of the same island by Matthias Stach and four families from New Herrnhut. The first conversions were not made until 1760 or 1761, but afterwards the population of the settlement rose to around 300 and was for a time the largest village in Greenland. All urbanization in Greenland was negatively affected by the Royal Greenland Trading Department (KGH)'s Instruction of 1782, aimed at protecting the company's income by maintaining the Inuit in their traditional roles as nomadic hunters. The mission was surrendered to the Lutheran Church of Denmark in 1900 and has since been abandoned.

The last known great auk in Greenland was hunted near Fiskernæs in 1815 by one of the villagers.

== Climate ==
Qeqertarsuatsiaat experiences a tundra climate (Köppen: ET); with short, cool summers and long, freezing winters.

Climate data for Qeqertarsuatsiaat (Ukiiviit) (62.57°N 50.40°W) (20 m (66 ft) AMSL) (1991-2020 data)
Month	Jan	Feb	Mar	Apr	May	Jun	Jul	Aug	Sep	Oct	Nov	Dec	Year
Record high °C (°F)	9.5 (49.1)	10.2 (50.4)	9.9 (49.8)	11.3 (52.3)	17.6 (63.7)	18.3 (64.9)	19.4 (66.9)	16.2 (61.2)	16.8 (62.2)	17.1 (62.8)	13.1 (55.6)	9.8 (49.6)	19.4 (66.9)
Mean daily maximum °C (°F)	−3.9 (25.0)	−4.9 (23.2)	−3.8 (25.2)	−0.1 (31.8)	2.8 (37.0)	5.4 (41.7)	7.1 (44.8)	7.0 (44.6)	5.3 (41.5)	2.6 (36.7)	−0.3 (31.5)	−2.2 (28.0)	1.2 (34.2)
Daily mean °C (°F)	−5.9 (21.4)	−7.0 (19.4)	−5.7 (21.7)	−1.7 (28.9)	1.3 (34.3)	3.8 (38.8)	5.5 (41.9)	5.6 (42.1)	4.0 (39.2)	1.3 (34.3)	−1.9 (28.6)	−4.0 (24.8)	−0.4 (31.3)
Mean daily minimum °C (°F)	−7.8 (18.0)	−9.1 (15.6)	−7.8 (18.0)	−3.5 (25.7)	−0.1 (31.8)	2.4 (36.3)	4.0 (39.2)	4.2 (39.6)	2.7 (36.9)	−0.1 (31.8)	−3.5 (25.7)	−5.8 (21.6)	−2.0 (28.4)
Record low °C (°F)	−23.8 (−10.8)	−26.5 (−15.7)	−26.2 (−15.2)	−14.1 (6.6)	−14.1 (6.6)	−2.6 (27.3)	−0.2 (31.6)	−2.9 (26.8)	−2.6 (27.3)	−8.0 (17.6)	−15.8 (3.6)	−22.6 (−8.7)	−26.5 (−15.7)
Average relative humidity (%)	71.6	72.3	72.8	77.8	85.2	90.9	92.1	92.8	85.9	75.7	72.1	72.8	80.2
Source: Danish Meteorological Institute (1991-2020 temperature & humidity)

== Transport and amenities ==
Qeqertarsuatsiaat is a port of call for the Arctic Umiaq Line ferry. There is a viewpoint at Telehuset. The Danish Crown Princely family visited the town as part of an official tour of Greenland in summer 2014.

== Mining ==
As of 2015 a mine employing 30 people in the mining of pink sapphire and rubies from the Aappaluttoq deposit was under development by True North Gems Greenland, a Canadian firm, near Qeqertarsuatsiaat.

== Population ==
Qeqertarsuatsiaat has lost population in the last two decades: more than a quarter since 1990 and almost 10 percent since 2000.

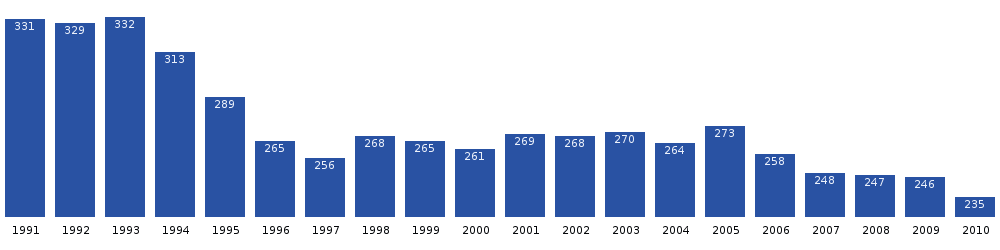
Qeqertarsuatsiaat population growth dynamics in the last two decades. (Source: Statistics Greenland)
