= Lars Dalager =

Danish merchant

- Born: 1722; Rødby, Denmark
- Died: 7 January 1772 (aged 49–50); Vadsø, Norway
- Occupation: Merchant
- Spouse: Anna Kirstine Fuchs (married 1770)
- Parent(s): Jens Laursen Dalager; Anna Goe
- Relatives: Christopher Carl Dalager (brother); Maren Dalager (sister); Anna Kristine Dalager (sister)

Lars Dalager (1722 – 7 January 1772) was a Danish merchant.

== Biography ==
Lars Dalager was born in Rødby. His parents were customs officer Jens Laursen Dalager (ca. 1670–1742) and Anna Goe (1688–1769).

After completing school, he probably worked for his cousin Jacob Severin, in whose employ he was sent to Greenland in 1740. In 1742, he was assistant in setting up the colony of Frederikshåb (Paamiut). One year later, he was the merchant in charge of the colony. In spite of large difficulties during the initial years, his management allowed the colony to endure.

After briefly living in Denmark from 1748 to 1750, Lars Dalager was employed by the General Trade Company in Godthåb (Nuuk). After a Greenlandic hunter reported in July 1751 to have seen the mountains on the eastern coast from up on the inland Greenland ice sheet, Lars Dalager set out in the hope of finding the long lost Eastern Settlement. Together with the hunter, the hunter's daughter, and two other Greenlanders, he climbed the ice in September. From the top, he could observe the peaks to the east, but decided to turn back, partly due to the state of the party's footwear. In fact, the peaks Dalager had seen were only few kilometres away. They were named the Dalager Nunataks by Jens Arnold Diderich Jensen in 1878.

After living in Denmark from 1752 to 1754, Lars Dalager returned to Godthåb. Here he tried to encourage the Inuit to resume their traditional seal-hunting, without much success. In 1756, he reported to his government that English whalers had stolen from one settlement in northwest Greenland the Inuit's entire supply of whaling products, and that in another village, Dutch whalers had not only taken the blubber and whalebone from five whales, but also attempted to kidnap an Inuk. The whalers were frequently drunk and violent, sometimes frightening the Inuit away from their settlements. He sympathised with the local Moravian mission, but came into conflict with the Danish Mission College.

In 1767, he was transferred to Finnmark in Norway where he was given the post of merchant in Kjøllefjord and Tana, before being transferred once more, to Vadsø in 1770, where he married Anna Kirstine Fuchs. He died one and a half years later, at 49 years of age.
