= New Herrnhut =

New Herrnhut (German: Neu-Herrnhut) may refer to:

- Old Nuuk, now the capital of Greenland, originally established as a Moravian mission known as Neu-Herrnhut or Nye-Hernhut
- New Herrnhut Moravian Church, a Moravian mission in Charlotte Amalie, Virgin Islands
