= Jens Haven =

Danish-Canadian Moravian missionary (1724–1796)

Jens Haven (June 23, 1724 – April 16, 1796) was a Danish Moravian missionary and the prime mover behind the founding of the Moravian missions in Labrador.

== Biography ==
Jens Haven was born at Sønderhaven in Vust parish, Jammerbugt, Denmark. His family were Lutheran, but after being apprenticed to a Moravian joiner, he joined the Moravian community at Herrnhut in eastern Saxony, Germany. In 1758, he went with his brother Peter and Matthäus Stach to the missions in Greenland among the Inuit, remaining there four years and helping to found the settlement of Lichtenfels. Haven had long wished to go to Labrador, and was not deterred by the prior murder by natives of Labrador of six missionaries, led by Johann Christian Erhardt (1718—1752).

In Memoir of the Life of Br. Jens Haven, he is recorded as saying:

In the year 1752, hearing at Herrnhut, that Dr. Erhardt, a Missionary sent to the coast of Labrador had been murdered by the Esquimaux, I felt for the first time a strong impulse to go and preach the Gospel to this very nation, and become certain, in my own mind that I should go to Labrador.

After receiving permission from Moravian Church leaders in 1764, Haven travelled to London and met Hugh Palliser, Governor of Newfoundland, and made his intentions to establish a mission known. With Palliser's assistance, he arrived at the Strait of Belle Isle in the summer of that year. His first encounter with Newfoundland Inuit was at Quirpon, and he was able to speak with them in their native tongue, which he had learned while stationed in Greenland. Haven was received well by the Inuit and was known among them as Jens Ingoak or little Jens. He was respected by the Inuit as he spoke their language, wore similar clothes, and was small in stature. Temperamentally, he was described as rough and having a hot temper, yet warm and single-minded.

Based on Haven's experiences, the Moravians decided to establish a permanent mission in Labrador, and in 1765 Haven returned with three more missionaries. Because of disagreements between the Moravians and the English authorities over land grants, Haven returned to Europe, spending most of his time in England and the Netherlands. Eventually, in 1769, the requested lands, 100,000 acres (400 km^{2}), were obtained, and Haven returned to Labrador in 1770. He went back to England later that year to make arrangements for the proposed mission house, and before returning in 1771, married Mary Butterworth, an English Moravian.

The 14-member missionary group—consisting of Germans, Danes, and Britons—chose a site which they called Nain. Nain was not an ideal site for the mission so a new one was set up at Okak in 1776, north of Nain. Then in 1782 another site at Hopedale was begun by Haven. In poor health, Haven retired to Herrnhut in 1784 and died there in 1796. He was blind for the last few years of his life.

== Legacy ==
- Jens Haven, the seventh highest peak (58°55′30″N 63°44′30″W) in the Torngat Mountains on the Labrador Peninsula is named in his honor.
- Jens Haven Island (58°31′18″N 63°3′48″W) on the coast of Newfoundland and Labrador is named in his memory.
- Jens Haven Memorial, a primary school in Nain, is named for Jens Haven.

== Other sources ==
- Memoir of the life of Br. Jens Haven, the first missionary of the Brethren's Church to the Esquimaux, on the coast of Labrador (1899)

== Related Reading ==
- Petrone, Penny (1992) Northern Voices: Inuit Writing in English (University of Toronto Press) ISBN 9780802077172
