= Colonization of Greenland =

The Colonization of Greenland may refer to either:

- the Norse colonization of Greenland in the 10th century
- the Danish colonization of Greenland in the 18th century
