= Johann Christian Nehring =

- Born: 29 December 1671; Goldbach, Thuringia
- Died: 29 April 1736 (aged 64); Morl
- Occupations: Rektor; Lutheran minister; Hymnwriter

Johann Christian Nehring (29 December 1671 – 29 April 1736) was a German Rektor, supervisor or orphanages, Lutheran minister and hymnwriter. He is known as the author of hymn stanzas that were included in "Sonne der Gerechtigkeit" in 1932.

Nehring was born in Goldbach, Thuringia. He first studied medicine, but was influenced by pietism, as taught by August Hermann Francke. He worked as a Rektor in Essen, as a supervisor or orphanages in Halle, and as a Lutheran minister in Nauendorf and Morl.

As a hymnwriter, he expanded a hymn, "Sie wie lieblich und wie fein" by Michael Müller, which was published in Halle in 1704 in the collection Geistreiches Gesang-Buch by Johann Anastasius Freylinghausen. he is known as the author of hymn stanzas that were included in "Sonne der Gerechtigkeit" in 1932, when Otto Riethmüller chose two of his stanzas for the hymn "Sonne der Gerechtigkeit", published first in 1932 in a song book for young people, Ein neues Lied (A new song), and later in many hymnals.

== Publications ==
- Kurze Einleitung in die Universal-Historie, wie dieselbe kleinen Kindern beizubringen ist, in 136 einfältigen Fragen u. Antworten. (Short introduction to universal history, as it should be taught to little children, in 136 simple questions and answers). Cölln 1698.
- Allgemeine geist- und weltliche Historie. Halle 1719.

== Bibliography ==
- Ackermann, Andrea (2015). Evang, Martin; Alpermann, Ilsabe (eds.). 262/263 Sonne der Gerechtigkeit (in German). Vandenhoeck & Ruprecht. pp. 51–57. ISBN 9783647503448.
- Nüssel, Friederike (22 June 2008). "Predigt Prof. Dr. Friederike Nüssel über EG 262" (in German). Heidelberg University.
- Albert Schumann (1886). "Nehring, Johann Christian". Allgemeine Deutsche Biographie (in German). Vol. 23. Leipzig: Duncker & Humblot. pp. 394–395.
