= Idlorpait =

- Location within Greenland
- Coordinates: 60°28′04″N 45°21′36″W
- State: Kingdom of Denmark
- Constituent country: Greenland
- Municipality: Kujalleq
- Founded: 1864
- Abandoned: 1900
- Time zone: UTC-03

Idlorpait is a former Moravian mission in southernmost Greenland located between the missions at Lichtenau and Friedrichsthal.

It was founded in 1864 and operated until 1900, when it was surrendered to the Lutheran Church of Denmark.
