= Christian David =

German-Czech Lutheran missionary, writer and hymnwriter

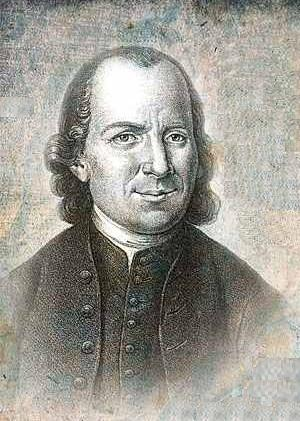
- Christian David
- Born: 17 February 1692; Ženklava, Moravia, Habsburg monarchy
- Died: 3 February 1751 (aged 58); Herrnhut, Electorate of Saxony
- Occupation(s): Missionary, writer, hymnwriter
- Organizations: Moravian Church

Christian David (Czech: Kristián David; 17 February 1692 – 3 February 1751) was a German-Czech missionary, writer and hymnwriter. He travelled as a missionary of the Moravian Church to Greenland and to Native Americans. He is known as the author of hymn stanzas that were included in Sonne der Gerechtigkeit in 1932.

== Biography ==
David was born on 17 February 1692 in Ženklava. His mother was Czech and his father was German. He was raised in the Catholic Church. He worked as a carpenter and a soldier. He was impressed by the pietist movement and converted in 1714. In 1722, he helped refugees from Moravia to escape the Counter-Reformation to Saxony. There, he was a co-founder of the Herrnhuter Brüdergemeine, working closely with of Count Nicolaus Zinzendorf. David went as a missionary of the Herrnhuter Brüdergemeine to Greenland and to Native Americans, among other places. On a mission to Greenland, he cofounded in 1733 the settlement Neu-Herrnhut, with Matthias Stach and Christian Stach.

David wrote a hymn "Seyd gegrüßt, zu tausendmahl" (Be welcome, a thousand times), published in 1728. Two centuries later, Otto Riethmüller chose two of its stanzas for the hymn "Sonne der Gerechtigkeit", published first in 1932 in a song book for young people, Ein neues Lied (A new song), and later in many hymnals. An additional stanza was added to the hymn in an ecumenical version in 1971.

== Bibliography ==
- Ackermann, Andrea (2015). "262/263 Sonne der Gerechtigkeit". In Evang, Martin; Alpermann, Ilsabe (eds.). Liederkunde zum Evangelischen Gesangbuch (in German). Vandenhoeck & Ruprecht. pp. 51–57. ISBN 9783647503448.
- Brown, William (1816). "Greenland". The History of Missions: Or, Of the Propagation of Christianity Among the Heathen, Since the Reformation. B. Coles V.D.M. pp. 290–295.
- Eckert, Eugen (2007). ""Sonne der Gerechtigkeit" / Predigtmeditation zu einem ökumenischen Missionslied" (in German). Der evangelische Rundfunkbeauftragte beim WDR.
- Kißkalt, Michael (2007). ""Sonne der Gerechtigkeit" / Predigtmeditation zu einem ökumenischen Missionslied" (PDF) (in German). Theologisches Seminar Elstal.
- Lüdecke, Cornelia (2005). "East Meets West: Meteorological observations of the Moravians in Greenland and Labrador since the 18th century" (PDF). History of Meteorology. Archived from the original (PDF) on 3 March 2016.
- Nüssel, Friederike (22 June 2008). "Predigt Prof. Dr. Friederike Nüssel über EG 262" (in German). Heidelberg University.
