= Christian Gottlob Barth =

German writer of children's bible stories (1799–1862)

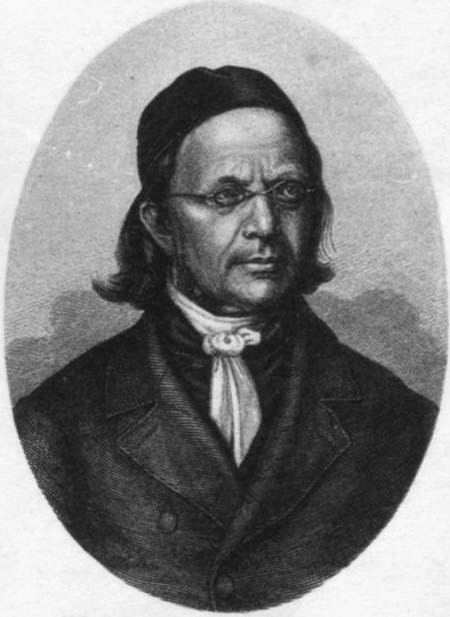
- Born: 31 July 1799; Stuttgart
- Died: 12 November 1862 (aged 63); Calw
- Education: Stift Tübingen
- Occupations: Protestant minister; Writer; Hymnwriter; Publisher
- Organizations: Calwer Verlag
- Awards: Bavarian Academy of Sciences and Humanities; Memorial Day in the Lutheran Saints Calendar

Christian Gottlob Barth (31 July 1799 – 12 November 1862) was a German Protestant minister, writer and publisher. He founded the publishing house Calwer Verlag in 1833. A representative of pietism in Württemberg, he is regarded as one of the fathers of the Christian revival (Erweckungsbewegung) there in the 19th century. He is also remembered for his children's Bible, which was translated into English as Bible Stories and subsequently into many other languages.

== Career ==
Born in Stuttgart, Barth studied theology at Tübinger Stift. He was from 1824 to 1838 minister in Möttlingen. He then worked for the Calwer Verlagsverein (Calw publishing association), which he had founded in 1833. He focused on the publication of Christian education, including folk literature. He traveled to England and Scotland, and was a founding member of the World Evangelical Alliance (Weltweite Evangelische Allianz.

Barth wrote the lyrics for several songs and hymns. Some of them appear in the current Protestant hymnal Evangelisches Gesangbuch. Three of his hymn stanzas were included in 1932 in the hymn "Sonne der Gerechtigkeit", compiled by Otto Riethmüller. He wrote in 1832 Zweymal zwey und fünfzig biblische Geschichten für Schulen und Familien (Twice fifty-two Biblical Stories for Schools and Families), a children's Bible, translated into English as Bible Stories, and then into various languages. The title relates to a well-known earlier work that Johann Hübner wrote in 1714. Barth published in 1843 Geschichte von Württemberg (History of Württemberg), which appeared in several editions.

Barth was known for his collection of ethnology, which was expanded by missionaries who worked for him. He donated pieces to the Naturaliencabinett in Stuttgart and to the Tübingen University. He died in Calw.

== Awards ==
He was elected to the Bavarian Academy of Sciences and Humanities in 1845. In 1848, he became honorary member of the Gesellschaft für Naturkunde in Württemberg (Association of Natural Science in Württemberg).

12 November is his memorial day in the calendar of saints.

== Literature ==
- Karl Friedrich Werner: Christian Gottlob Barth, Doktor der Theologie, nach seinem Leben und Wirken, 3 vol. Calw/Stuttgart 1865–1869.
- Wilhelm Kopp: Christian Gottlob Barth. Leben und Wirken. 1886 (Calwer Familienbibliothek vol. 1).
- Karl Müller: Die religiöse Erweckung im Anfang des 19. Jahrhunderts. 1925.
- Julius Roessle: Von Bengel bis Blumhardt. 4. Aufl. 1966.
- Werner Raupp: Christian Gottlob Barth. Studien zu Leben und Werk. 1998 (Dissertation Tübingen 1996).
- Werner Raupp: "BARTH, Christian Gottlob". - In: Biographisch-Bibliographisches Kirchenlexikon (BBKL). Vol. 18, Herzberg: Bautz 2001 (ISBN 3-88309-086-7), Sp. 125–152 (with detailed bibliography).
