= List of Danish colonial trading posts and settlements =

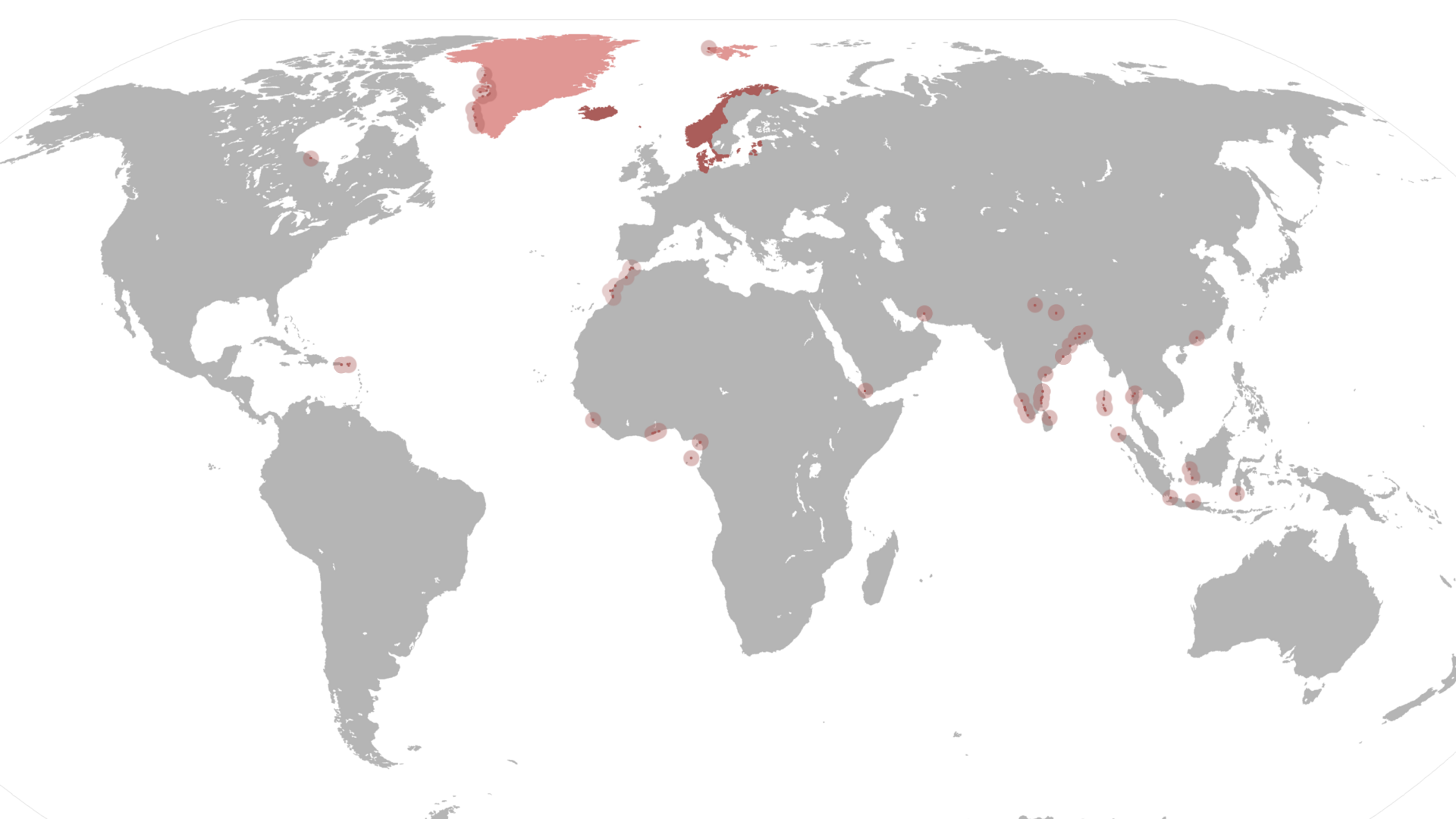
All lands ruled by Denmark-Norway (Including factories and Trading posts)

The following were trading posts and settlements owned by the Danish colonial empire and respective Chartered companies:

== Europe ==
=== Iceland 1602 – 1786 ===
- Ísafjörður
- Reykjarfjörður
- Þingeyri
- Bíldudalur
- Patreksfjörður
- Stykkishólmur
- Ólafsvík
- Grundarfjörður
- Búðir
- Arnarstapi
- Keflavík
- Básendar
- Grindavík
- Reykjavík
- Hafnarfjörður
- Eyrarbakki
- Vestmannaeyjar
- Skagaströnd
- Akureyri
- Húsavík
- Vopnafjörður
- Reyðarfjörður
- Djúpivogur

=== Svalbard ===
- Smeerenburg 1619 – 1625
- Cookery of Harlingen 1630s

== Americas ==
=== Canada ===
- Churchill River (Nova Dania) September 1619 – 16 July 1620

=== Caribbean ===
- Saint John (Sankt Jan) 1671 – 1917
- Saint Thomas (Sankt Thomas) 1671 – 1917
- Saint Croix (Sankt Croix) 15 June 1733 – 1917
- Crab Island (Krabbe Øen) 1698 – 1763

=== Greenland ===
- Nuuk (Godthaab) 1728 – 1950
- Qasigiannguit (Christianshaab) 1734 – 1950
- Ilulissat (Jacobshavn) 1741 – 1950
- Paamiut (Frederikshåb) 1742 – 1950
- Ilimanaq (Claushavn) 1752 – 1950
- Qeqertarsuatsiaat (Fiskenæsset) 1754 – 1950
- Ritenbenck 1755 – 1950
- Uummannaq (Umanak) 1758 – 1950
- Aasiaat (Egedesminde) 1759 – 1950
- Sisimiut (Holsteinsborg) 1764 – 1950
- Upernavik 1772 – 1950
- Qeqertarsuaq (Godhavn) 10 July 1773 – 1950

== Africa ==
- São Tomé Island (unknown date)

=== Gold Coast ===
- Osu Castle (Fort Christiansborg) 1658 – 1664
- Anomabu 1658 – 1659
- Cape Coast Castle (Fort Carlsborg) 1658 – 1664
- Fort Frederiksborg 1659 – 1685
- Cong Heights 1659 – 1661
- Fort Fredensborg 1734 – 1850
- Fort Prinzenstein (Fort Prinsensten) 1784 – 1850
- Fort Kongenstein (Fort Kongensten) 1784 – 1850
- Fort Augustaborg 1784 – 1850

=== Morocco 1755-1766 ===
- Safi
- Agadir
- Island of Mogador
- Mogador
- Tetuan
- Tangier
- Larache
- Memora

=== Sierra Leone ===
- Bagos 1661 – 1662

== Asia ==
=== Ceylon ===
- Trincomalee 1619 – 1622

=== India ===
- Tranquebar (Trankebar) 1620 – 1801, 1802 – 1808, 1818 – 1845
- Machilipatnam 1625 – 1643
- Balasore 1625 – 1643, 1763 – 1845
- Pipli 1625 – 1640
- Oddeway Torre 1696 – 1722
- Gondalpara (Dannemarksnagore) 1698 – 1714
- Calicut 1752 – 1791
- Colachel 1755 – 1808
- Serampore (Frederiknagore) 1755 – 1801, 1802 – 1808, 1818 – 1845
- Patna 1772 – 1827
- Pondicherry (Polesere) c. 1635 – 1675
- Cuddalore
- Tegnapatnam
- Madras
- Porto Novo
- Hugli-Chuchura
- Tellingapore 1708 – 1714
- Allepey
- Cannanore
- Cochin
- Ganjam
- Holcheri
- Agra
- Visakhapatnam (Visinapatnam)
- Vinelapatnam

=== Nicobar Islands (Frederiksøerne) ===
- Great Nicobar Island 1754/56 – 1760
- Kamorta Island (Frederikshøj) 1760 – 1768
- Nancowry Island (Ny Sjælland) 1768 – 1773, 1784 – 1807/9, 1830 – 1834, 1846 – 1868

=== East Indies ===
- Aceh
- Banten
- Jepara
- Makassar
- Mattam
- Succadana
- Banjarmasin

=== Burma (Myanmar) ===
- Mergui
- Tenasserim

=== China ===
- Canton 1732 – 1844

=== Persia ===
- Hormuz

=== Yemen ===
- Mokha 1671 – 1684

== See also ==
- Danish India
- Danish overseas colonies
- Danish West Indies
- Danish colonization of the Americas
