= 1901 in chess =

Events in chess in 1901:

== News ==
- The Monte Carlo tournament is established. Dawid Janowski (France) wins the inaugural tournament, followed by Carl Schlechter (Austria) in second and Theodor von Scheve (Germany) and Mikhail Chigorin (Russia) tied for third.
- April 19–20 – The Anglo-American cable match is tied. On the top boards Harry Pillsbury (US) defeats Joseph Henry Blackburne (UK) and Amos Burn (UK) defeats Jackson Showalter (US). The American and British teams split on the remaining eight boards as well, for a 5–5 result.
- November–December – Thirteen-year-old José Raúl Capablanca defeats Cuban champion Juan Corzo in a match.
- Pillsbury wins the Buffalo tournament, scoring 9/10.

== Births ==
- David Enoch (died 1949), Israeli chess player
- Leon Kremer (1901–1941), Polish master, silver medalist at the 3rd unofficial Olympiad
- January 1 – Kazimierz Makarczyk (1901–1972), Polish master, born in Warsaw
- January 20 – Karl Gilg born in Mankovice (Mankendorf), Austrian Silesia (1901–1981) German International Master (1953)
- March 28 – Weaver W. Adams (1901–1963), American player, is born in Dedham, Massachusetts
- May 5 – Max Euwe (1901–1981), Dutch Grandmaster and fifth World Champion 1935–37, is born in Amsterdam
- June 27 – Endre Steiner (1901–1944), Hungarian chess player and older brother of Lajos Steiner, is born in Budapest
- August 29 – Louis Betbeder Matibet (1901–1986), French master, is born in Orléans
- September 2 – Imre König (1901–1992), is born in Gyula, Hungary

== Deaths ==
- May 20 – Johannes Minckwitz, German chess player and writer, dies in Biebrich) at age 68.
- July 31 – Wilfried Paulsen German chess master, an elder brother of Louis Paulsen, dies near Blomberg, North Rhine-Westphalia at age 72.
- November 24 – John Owen, English vicar and strong amateur chess player, dies in Twickenham at age 73
