= Senftleben =

Senftleben is a surname. Notable people with the surname include:

- Günther Senftleben (1925–1982), German cinematographer
- Ingo Senftleben (1974), German politician

== Other ==
- Ženklava (German: Senftleben), village in the Czech Republic
