= Umanak (mission) =

Mission in Greenland

- Uummannaq
- Location of Umanak mission in Greenland
- 64°29′27.96″N 50°47′55.68″W
- Location: Northeast from Nuuk, Greenland
- Region: Greenland

Umanak (Kalaallisut: Uummannaq, "Heart-shaped") was a former Moravian mission in mid-western Greenland, located upfjord from Neu-Herrnhut (modern Nuuk).

It was founded in 1861 and surrendered to the Lutheran Church of Denmark in 1900.

== See also ==
- Uummannaq, the unrelated present settlement also sometimes spelt Umanak
