= Sonne der Gerechtigkeit =

1932 German Christian hymn

- German Christian hymn
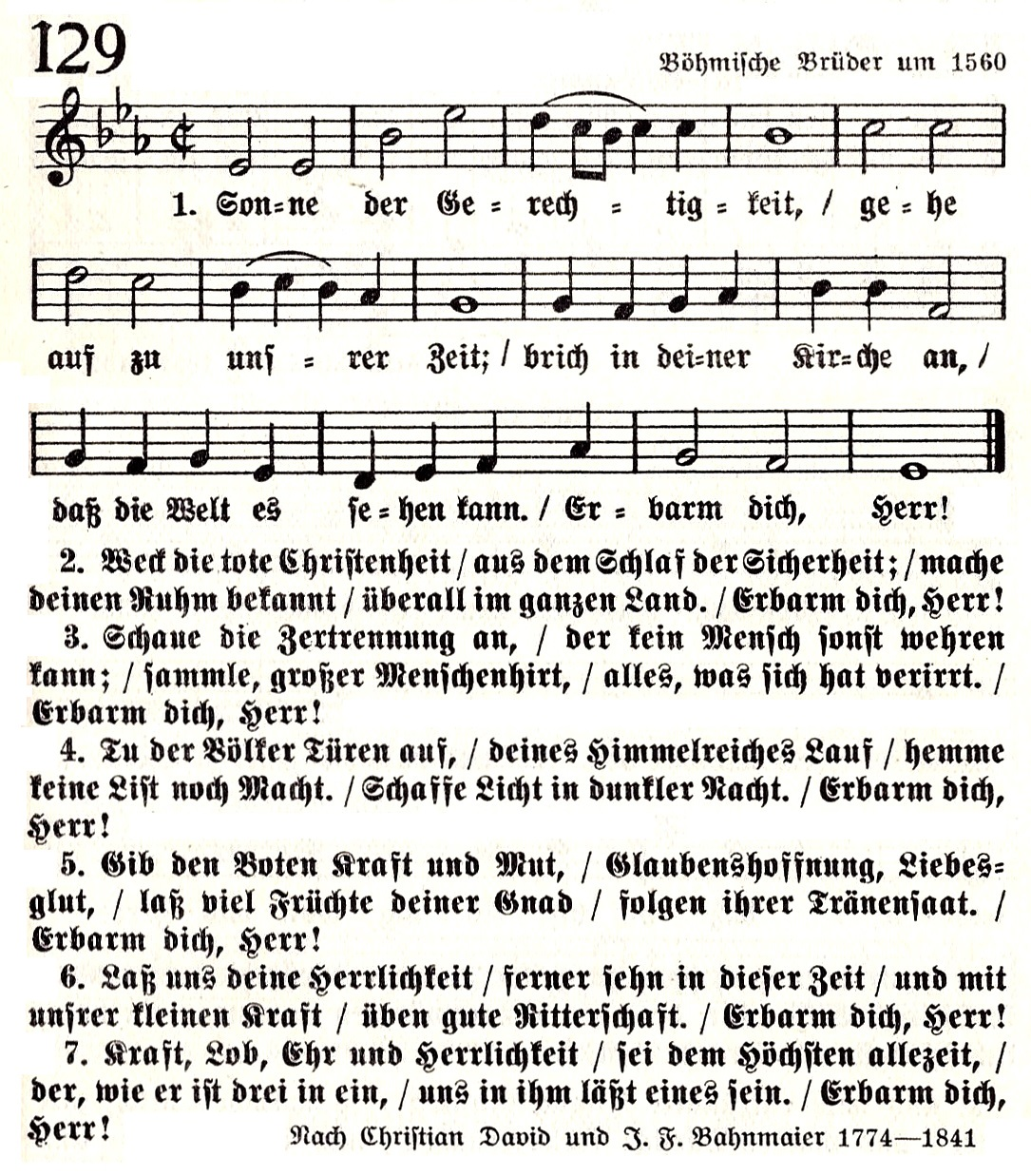
- The hymn in the first publication, the song book Ein neues Lied in 1932
- English: Sun of justice
- Text: Johann Christian Nehring (1704 3,7); Christian David (1728 1,6); Christian Gottlob Barth (1827 2,4,5); Otto Riethmüller (1932 compilation); ecumenical (1971 7a)
- Language: German
- Composed: 1467
- Published: 1932

"Sonne der Gerechtigkeit" (Sun of Justice) is a German Christian hymn with a complex history. The image of a sun of justice or righteousness was created by the prophet Malachi. The text was compiled around 1930 by Otto Riethmüller from older stanzas by different hymnwriters, intended as a wake-up call to the church in a Germany facing the rise of the Nazis. Four of its originally seven stanzas were written in the 18th century, two by Johann Christian Nehring, and two by Christian David. The remaining stanzas were taken from Christian Gottlob Barth, written in the 19th century. An alternative seventh stanza was suggested in 1970, with a strong ecumenical focus. The hymn expresses a call for justice, renewal and unity, within the congregation and church, and among peoples.

The melody was originally a secular song from the 15th century, which was used for a hymn by the Bohemian Brethren in the 16th century. "Sonne der Gerechtigkeit" became part of many hymnals, sung in several Christian denominations and for ecumenical events. It inspired vocal and organ music. With its stress on justice "in unserer Zeit" (in our time), the song has been used with a political meaning. It was often sung at the peace prayers in East Germany which led to Germany's reunification.

== History ==
The image "Sonne der Gerechtigkeit" was coined by Malachi, a biblical prophet (Malachi 4:2). The theme of the hymn is a yearning for justice and unity, within the congregation and church, and among peoples. Otto Riethmüller, who later became a member of the Confessing Church, compiled the text from older stanzas. He published it in the ecumenical song book for young people Ein neues Lied (A new song) in 1932, intended as a wake-up call to the church in a Germany facing Nazi doctrines.

=== Johann Christian Nehring ===
Riethmüller took stanzas 3 and 7 from Johann Christian Nehring, a Protestant minister in Halle who was close to August Hermann Francke and pietism. Nehring had expanded another hymn, "Sieh, wie lieblich und wie fein" by Michael Müller, which was published in Halle in 1704 in the collection Geistreiches Gesang-Buch by Johann Anastasius Freylinghausen. His focus is to promote unity among separated Christians, as God is three in one in the Trinity.

=== Christian David ===
Riethmüller took stanzas 2 and 6 from Christian David (1692–1751), who was raised Catholic and worked as a carpenter and a soldier. He was impressed by the pietist movement and converted in 1714. He worked closely with Nikolaus Ludwig Graf von Zinzendorf. David went as a missionary of the Herrnhuter Brüdergemeinde to Greenland, among other places. His focus is the origin of all preaching in Jesus who is identified with the sun of justice. His stanzas were part of a hymn "Seyd gegrüßt, zu tausendmahl", published in 1728.

=== Christian Gottlob Barth ===
Riethmüller found the other stanzas in writings by Christian Gottlob Barth who worked as a minister in Stuttgart. He founded the publishing house Calwer Verlag in 1833. When he retired from church service in 1838, he became a freelance writer for young people. His focus is a missionary approach, based on his work both worldwide in the Basel Mission and locally in the regional mission (Bezirksmission) and an institution for the rescue of children (Kinderrettungsanstalt) in Calw. His stanzas were found in "Jesu, bittend kommen wir", published in 1827/1837.

=== Otto Riethmüller ===
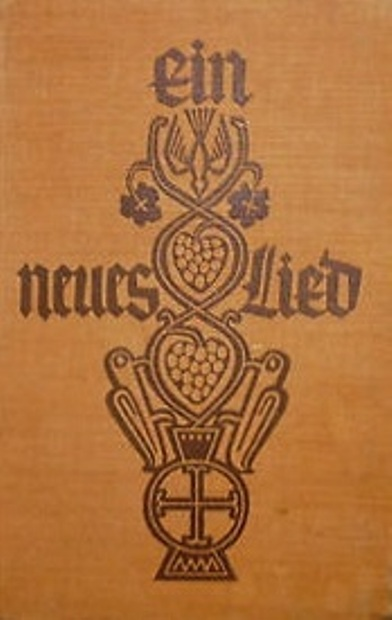
Cover of the song book Ein neues Lied, 1932, the first publication

Riethmüller unified the stanzas by ending each one with a fifth line, "Erbarm dich, Herr" (Have mercy, Lord), making it a late Leise. The song was first published in 1932 in Ein neues Lied (A new song), a song book for young people. It was listed under the header Kirche (Church).

=== Ecumenical version, hymnals ===
A 1970 ecumenical gathering at the centre of church music education in Schlüchtern suggested a different last stanza, also found in David's hymn. The hymn became part of many hymnals, beginning with the Protestant Evangelisches Kirchengesangbuch (EKG) in 1950. It appeared in 1971 in the Hymn Book of the Anglican Church of Canada, in the Dutch Liedboek voor de kerken of 1973. The ecumenical version was included in the Swiss Gemeinsame Kirchenlieder in 1973, in the Catholic Gotteslob of 1975, and in the Czech Evangelicky Zpevnik in 1979. It appears in the current Protestant hymnal Evangelisches Gesangbuch as both EG 262 (ecumenical version) and EG 263 (Riethmüller's version), and in the Catholic Gotteslob as GL 481 in the ecumenical version. It is featured in many songbooks.

=== Usage ===
With a stress on justice "in unserer Zeit" (in our time), it has been used with a political meaning in many situations. It has been sung at church conventions such as Kirchentag, making headlines. The song was part of the demonstrations in the GDR in the 1980s, remembered as probably the most often used song in the peace prayers (Friedensgebete), a protest against injustice, suspicion and spying in a world separated into East and West. Sonne der Gerechtigkeit was sung by 130,000 visitors of the 2013 Kirchentag. It has been regarded as an expression of political protest, ecumenical unity and inner revival of the church.

== Structure ==
The table shows for every stanza the incipit with a translation, the author and the year of first publication.

No.	Incipit	English	Author	Year
1	Sonne der Gerechtigkeit	Sun of justice	David	1728
2	Weck die tote Christenheit	Wake up dead Christendom	Barth	1827
3	Schaue die Zertrennung an	Look at the separation	Nehring	1704
4	Tu der Völker Türen auf	Open the doors of the peoples	Barth	1827
5	Gib den Boten Kraft und Mut	Give strength and courage to the messengers	Barth	1827
6	Lass uns deine Herrlichkeit	Let us [see] your glory	David	1728
7	Kraft, Lob, Ehr und Herrlichkeit	Power, praise, honour and glory	Nehring	1704
7a	Lass uns eins sein, Jesu Christ	Let us be one, Jesus Christ	David	1728

The first stanza requests the sun of justice to rise in our time. It is interpreted as a symbol for Jesus who is asked to appear in his church, visible to the world. In the second stanza, dead Christianity ("die tote Christenheit") is called to wake up from the sleep of security, an idea typical for the Erweckungsbewegung (Christian revival) that Barth represented. The third stanza looks at separations and deviations. The fourth stanza widens the view to all peoples. The fifth stanza requests strength and courage for missionaries, and also the theological virtues: faith, hope and ardent love. The sixth stanza looks even further at eternal glory already in our time, and requests that we may be able to work towards peace however small our power is ("mit unsrer kleinen Kraft"). The seventh stanza is a doxology, giving honour and glory to the Trinity. The alternative "ecumenical" final stanza (7a) is focused on unity, compared to the unity of Jesus and God.

== Melody and musical settings ==
The tune was first a secular song, "Der reich Mann war geritten aus" (The rich man went on a ride), known in Bohemia from the 15th century but possibly even older. It was printed as a five-part setting by Jobst vom Brandt in the fifth part of Georg Forster's song collection Schöner fröhlicher neuer und alter deutscher Liedlein in Nuremberg in 1556. The melody was used for a sacred song first in 1561, in a Czech hymnal of Bohemian Brethren. In 1566 it appeared with a German text of the Brethren, "Mensch, erheb dein Herz zu Gott" (Raise your heart to God). The melody rises an octave in just two steps, in an uplifting way. Its "recitation tempo" is faster in the second half.

Other songs in English sung to the same tune are "At the Lamb's High Feast We Sing", "Hail this joyful day's return" and "Come, O come with sacred lays".

Ernst Pepping composed two chorale settings of the hymn for three voices for his Spandauer Chorbuch. / Zwei- bis sechsstimmige Choralsätze für das Kirchenjahr (Spanday choral book. 2–6-part chorale settings for the church year), published by Schott in 1936 and 1941, and a chorale prelude in his Kleines Orgelbuch. Paul Horn wrote a chorale cantata for mixed choir, brass and organ, published by Carus in 1962. Gaël Liardon composed six chorale preludes.
