= General Trade Company =

Danish-Norwegian trading company

The General Trade Company (Danish: Det almindelige Handelskompagni) was a Dano-Norwegian trading company charged with administering the realm's settlements and trade in Greenland. The company existed from 1747 to 1774 and managed the government of Greenland from 1749.

== History ==
The General Trade Company was founded on 4 September 1747. Learning from the mistakes of the earlier Bergen Greenland Company and the relative success of Jacob Severin's operation on the island, the company received a full monopoly on trade around its settlements and armed ships flying the Danebrog to prevent better-armed, lower-priced, and better-quality Dutch goods from bankrupting the enterprise. It focused its operations on getting seal skins and whale oil from the native hunters for resale in Europe.

The GTC received Hans Egede's Godthaab; the Moravian missions Neu-Herrnhut and Lichtenfels; and Severin's trading stations at Christianshaab, Jakobshavn, and Frederikshaab. The General Trade Company was granted a monopoly only within a certain radius around its settlements and therefore undertook a campaign to expand the number of trading posts along the west coast as swiftly as it could profitably do so: Claushavn in 1752, Fiskenæsset in 1754, Ritenbenck and Egedesminde and Sukkertoppen in 1755, Holsteinsborg in 1756, Umanak in 1758, Upernavik in 1771, Godhavn in 1773, and Julianehaab in 1774.

The same year as the foundation of Julianehaab, 1774, the [General Trade Company] folded, although for reasons unrelated to the profitability of its operations in the colony. It was replaced by the Royal Greenland Trade Department (Kongelige Grønlandske Handel, KGH), a state company which maintained control of the colony for the next century and a half.
