= New Herrnhut Moravian Church =

- U.S. National Register of Historic Places
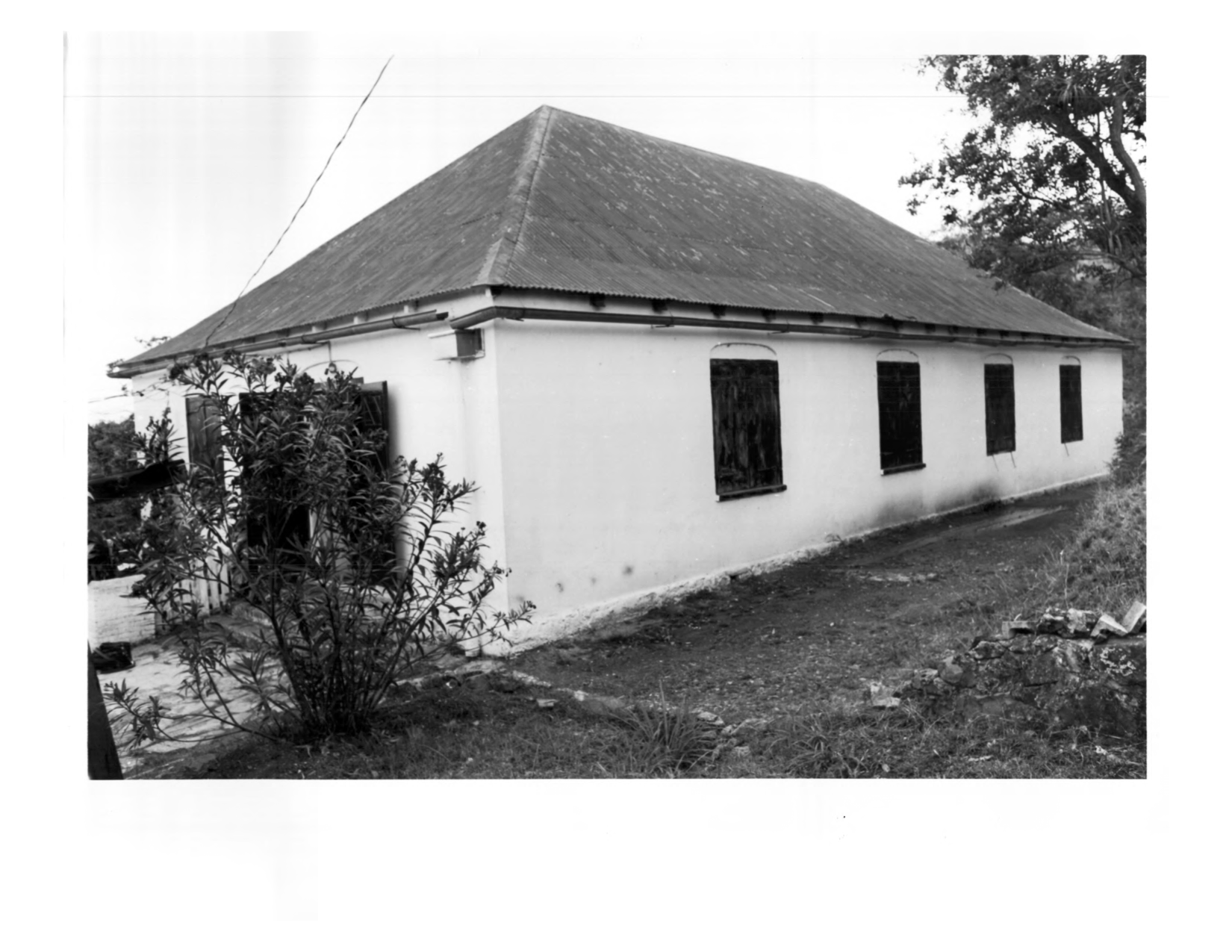

- Location within the U.S. Virgin Islands
- Nearest city: Charlotte Amalie, Virgin Islands
- Coordinates: 18.33350°N 64.90142°W
- Area: 4 acres (1.6 ha)
- Built: 1737
- NRHP reference No.: 76001866
- Added to NRHP: October 8, 1976

New Herrnhut Moravian Church is a historic Moravian church in Saint Thomas, U.S. Virgin Islands. The Moravians, a Protestant religious group based in the town of Herrnhut in Saxony, began missionary work in 1732 in St. Thomas and were the first Protestants to begin missionary work among slaves and free Blacks in the Danish West Indies. Missionary work on St. Thomas was initially opposed by planters who didn't want slaves to receive education or religious instruction.

The Moravians purchased the New Herrnhut site (then Bazuinenberg or (in German:) Posaunenberg) in 1738 and established it as the Brethren's Plantation or the 's Heeren Tutu, until renaming it New Herrnhut in 1753. The hurricane of 1867 destroyed much of the then-working plantation, but the church and bell tower survived.

The church, which is still in use, is a one-story building made of plaster and rubble, with a hipped roof and semi-elliptical arched windows and doors.

This church was added to the National Register of Historic Places in 1976.
