= Mankovice =

- Municipality
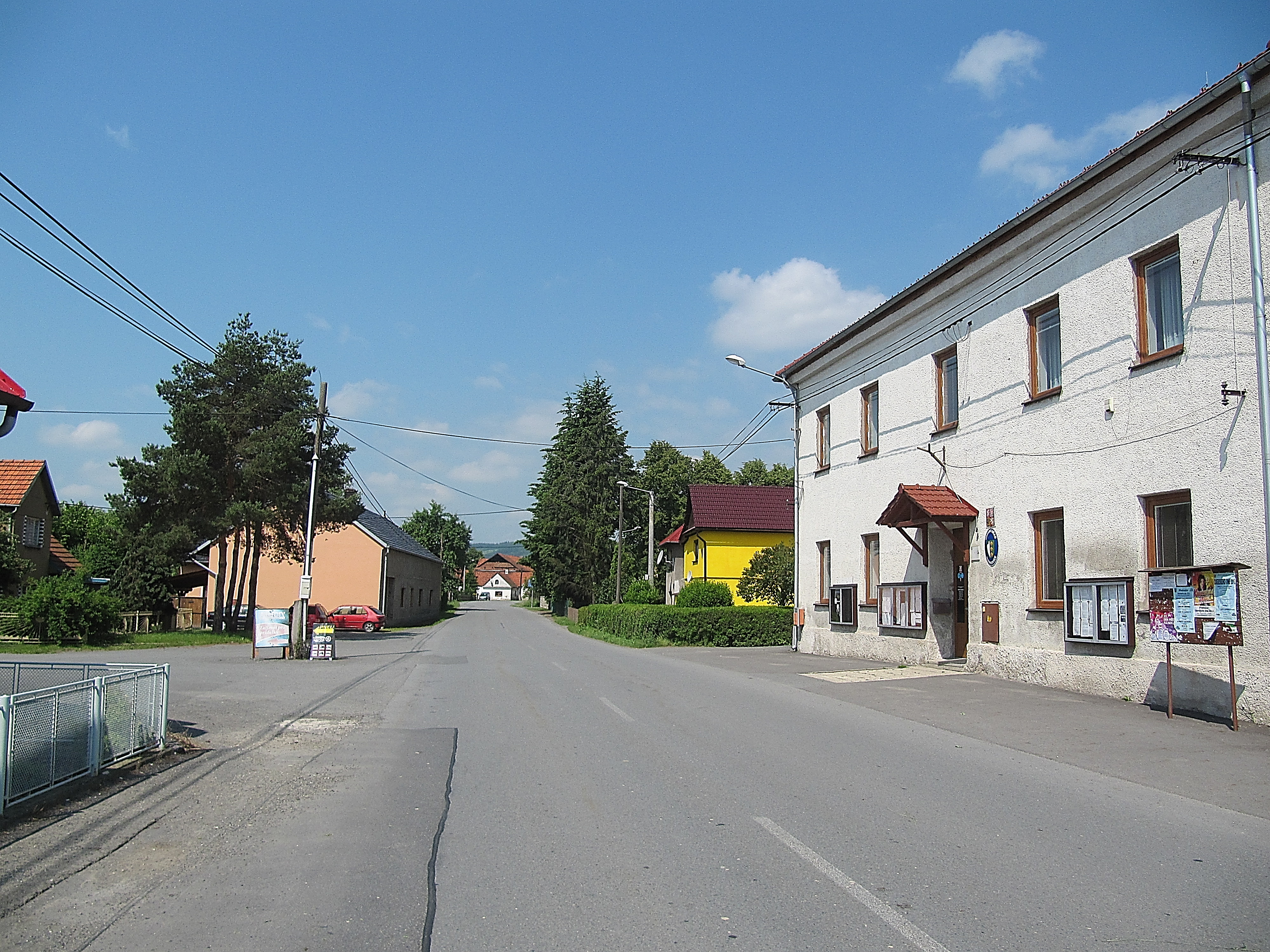
- Main street with the municipal office on the right

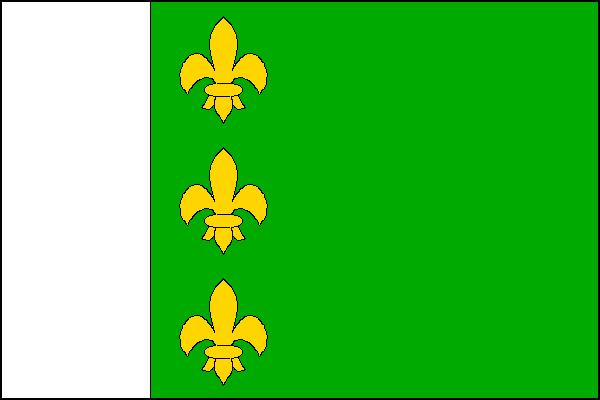
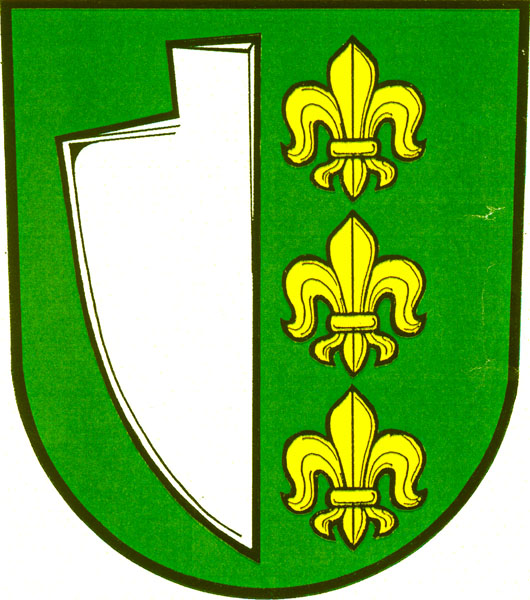
- Flag Coat of arms

- Location in the Czech Republic
- Coordinates: 49°38′15″N 17°52′49″E
- Country: Czech Republic
- Region: Moravian-Silesian
- District: Nový Jičín
- First mentioned: 1374

Area
  - Total: 10.12 km^{2} (3.91 sq mi)
- Elevation: 268 m (879 ft)

Population (2026-01-01)
  - Total: 528
  - Density: 52.2/km^{2} (135/sq mi)
- Time zone: UTC+1 (CET)
  - Summer (DST): UTC+2 (CEST)
- Postal code: 742 35
- Website: www.mankovice.cz

Mankovice (German: Mankendorf) is a municipality and village in Nový Jičín District in the Moravian-Silesian Region of the Czech Republic. It has about 500 inhabitants.

== History ==
The first written mention of Mankovice is from 1374.

During World War II, the German occupiers operated the E119 forced labour subcamp of the Stalag VIII-B/344 prisoner-of-war camp at a local sawmill.

== Demographics ==
Historical population
Year	Pop.	±%
1869	720	—
1880	763	+6.0%
1890	811	+6.3%
1900	746	−8.0%
1910	813	+9.0%
1921	771	−5.2%
1930	811	+5.2%
1950	677	−16.5%
1961	691	+2.1%
1970	631	−8.7%
1980	580	−8.1%
1991	541	−6.7%
2001	592	+9.4%
2011	592	+0.0%
2021	535	−9.6%
Source: Censuses

== Notable people ==
- Matthäus Stach (1711–1787), German Moravian missionary
- Karl Gilg (1901–1981), German chess player
