= Ženklava =

- Municipality
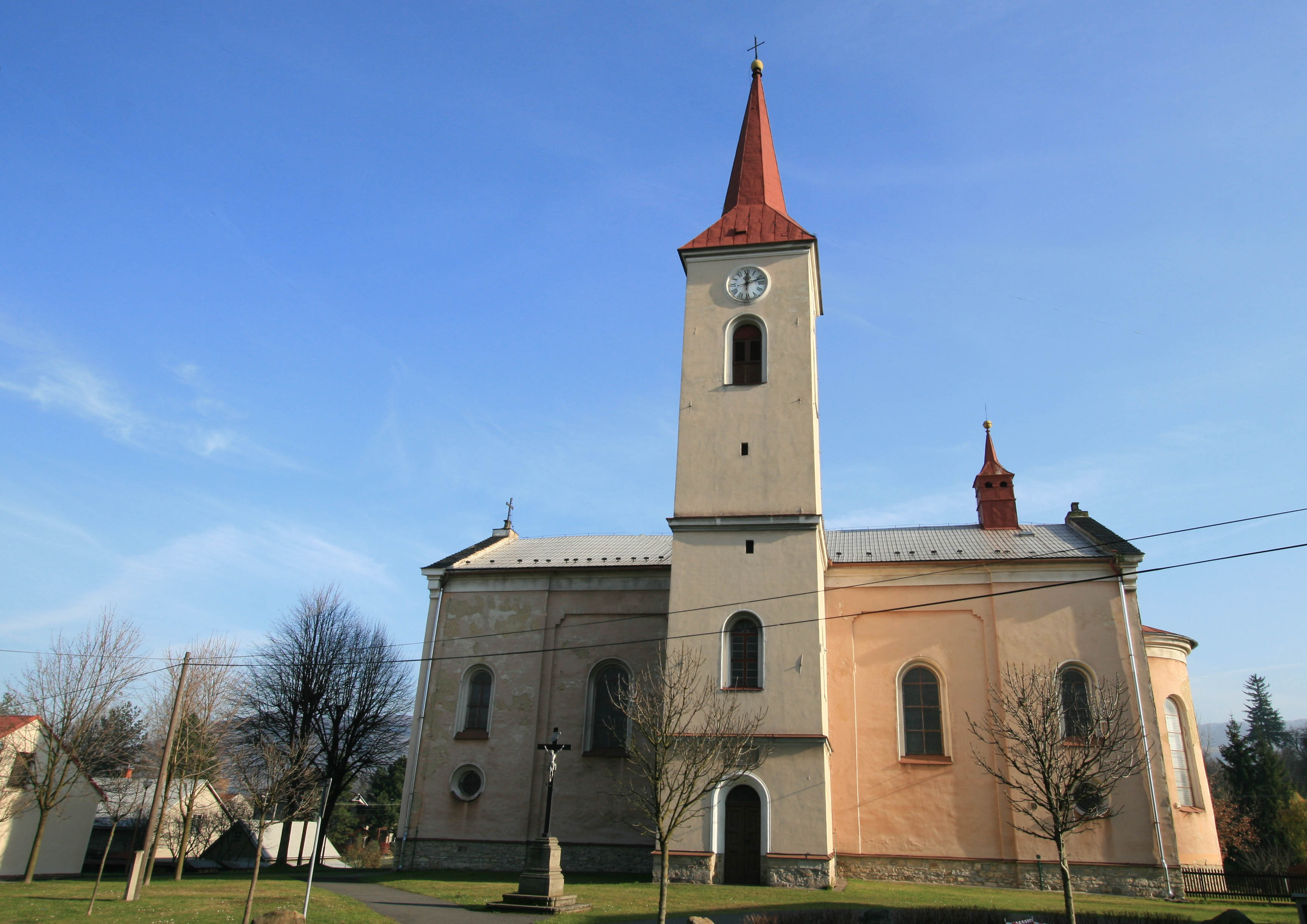
- Church of the Visitation of the Virgin Mary

- Flag Coat of arms

- Location in the Czech Republic
- Coordinates: 49°33′49″N 18°6′26″E
- Country: Czech Republic
- Region: Moravian-Silesian
- District: Nový Jičín
- First mentioned: 1411

Area
  - Total: 10.67 km^{2} (4.12 sq mi)
- Elevation: 336 m (1,102 ft)

Population (2026-01-01)
  - Total: 1,154
  - Density: 108.2/km^{2} (280.1/sq mi)
- Time zone: UTC+1 (CET)
  - Summer (DST): UTC+2 (CEST)
- Postal code: 742 67
- Website: www.zenklava.cz

Ženklava (German: Senftleben) is a municipality and village in Nový Jičín District in the Moravian-Silesian Region of the Czech Republic. It has about 1,200 inhabitants.

== Demographics ==
Historical population
| Year | Pop. | ±% |
|---|---|---|
| 1869 | 845 | — |
| 1880 | 863 | +2.1% |
| 1890 | 906 | +5.0% |
| 1900 | 911 | +0.6% |
| 1910 | 1,028 | +12.8% |
| 1921 | 1,100 | +7.0% |
| 1930 | 1,154 | +4.9% |
| 1950 | 1,177 | +2.0% |
| 1961 | 1,059 | −10.0% |
| 1970 | 951 | −10.2% |
| 1980 | 898 | −5.6% |
| 1991 | 733 | −18.4% |
| 2001 | 847 | +15.6% |
| 2011 | 972 | +14.8% |
| 2021 | 1,058 | +8.8% |
Source: Censuses

== Notable people ==
- Christian David (1692–1751), German Lutheran missionary, writer and hymnwriter
