= Otto Riethmüller =

German Lutheran minister and hymnwriter (1889–1938)

- Born: 26 February 1889; Cannstatt, Kingdom of Württemberg, German Empire
- Died: 19 November 1938 (aged 49); Berlin, Nazi Germany
- Education: University of Tübingen
- Occupations: Lutheran minister; Writer; Hymnwriter; President of youth organisations
- Organizations: Evangelischer Reichsverband weiblicher Jugend; Confessing Church; Evangelische Jugend

Otto Riethmüller (26 February 1889 – 19 November 1938) was a German Lutheran minister, writer, and hymnwriter. He was the president of Protestant youth organisations from 1928, published songbooks, and was a leading member of the Confessing Church. He designed the Protestant youth organization's logo, the Cross on the Globe, which is still used today.

== Life and career ==
Born in Cannstatt, Riethmüller studied theology at the University of Tübingen and was especially influenced by Adolf Schlatter. He held several offices as parish minister, including from 1919 in Esslingen am Neckar. He married Anna née von Heider (1886–1967) on 17 June 1919. The couple had two sons and a daughter.

In 1928, Riethmüler became director of the national Protestant organisation of young women (Evangelischer Reichsverband weiblicher Jugend) in the Burckhardthaus in Berlin-Dahlem, which was founded by Johannes Burckhardt in 1889.

From 1930, a yearly motto (Jahreslosung) for the church was chosen on his initiative. He selected for the first year from Romans 1:16: "Ich schäme mich des Evangeliums von Jesus Christus nicht" (I am not ashamed of the gospel of Jesus Christ). He published in 1932 a songbook for young people, Ein neues Lied (A new song), with songs such as his compilation "Sonne der Gerechtigkeit", meant to wake up in the face of Nazi doctrines winning acceptance. He also translated Latin hymn such as Verbum supernum prodiens ("Das Wort geht von dem Vater aus") and wrote new songs including "Herr, wir stehen Hand in Hand" (Lord, we stand hand in hand), printed in the songbook Der helle Ton (The light sound) of 1934. In 1935, he became president of the section for young people (Jugendkammer) of the Bekennende Kirche. He was among the first to sign a protest to accept the Aryan paragraph for the church.

Cross on the Globe, the logo of the Protestant Youth from 1935

While he was president of the Evangelische Jugend (Protestant Youth), he created their logo, the Cross on the Globe, in 1935. It is still the logo of Protestant youth organisations.

Riethmüller died on 19 November 1938 in Berlin and was buried at the Uff churchyard in Bad Cannstatt.

The Otto-Riethmüller-Haus in Weidenthal, a house for recreation and education of Protestant youth groups, was named after him, and also the Otto-Riethmüller-Haus in Stuttgart, a Protestant vacation retreat in a forest.

== Songs ==
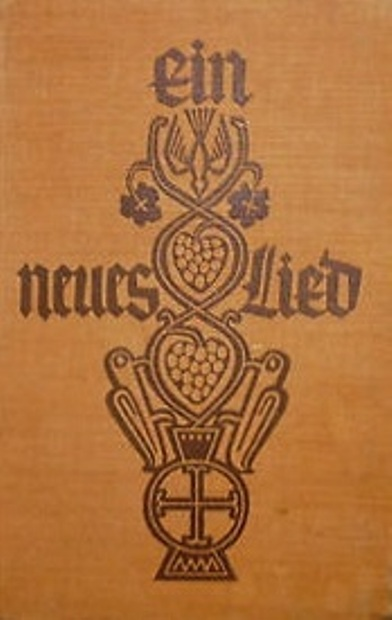
Cover of the songbook Ein neues Lied, 1932

The following songs, which Riethmüller wrote or edited, are part of the Protestant hymnal Evangelisches Gesangbuch of 1993. They were all published in 1932, with the exception of "Du Schöpfer aller Wesen" which appeared in 1934:

- "Der Morgenstern ist aufgedrungen" (text ed., EG 69)
- "Singen wir heut mit einem Mund" (text ed., EG 104)
- "Das Wort geht von dem Vater aus" (text ed., EG 223)
- "Lob Gott getrost mit Singen" (melody ed., EG 243)
- "Sonne der Gerechtigkeit" (compilation and choice of melody, EG 262+263)
- "Du Schöpfer aller Wesen" (text and Melodie, EG 485)
- "Herr, wir stehen Hand in Hand" (text, EG 602, regional part for Lower Saxony and Bremen)

== Literature ==
- Emil Lauxmann: Otto Riethmüller: Sein Leben und sein Wirken (Begegnungen, [N.F.], vol. 1). Calwer Verlag, Stuttgart 1959.
- Martin Rößler: Liedermacher im Gesangbuch. vol. 3: Christian Fürchtegott Gellert, Ernst Moritz Arndt, Albert Knapp, Otto Riethmüller, Jochen Klepper (Calwer Taschenbibliothek, 6). Calwer Verlag, Stuttgart 1991, ISBN 3-7668-3064-3.
