= Alluitsoq =

Former settlement in southern Greenland

Coordinates: 60°33′N 45°28′W

Location within Greenland

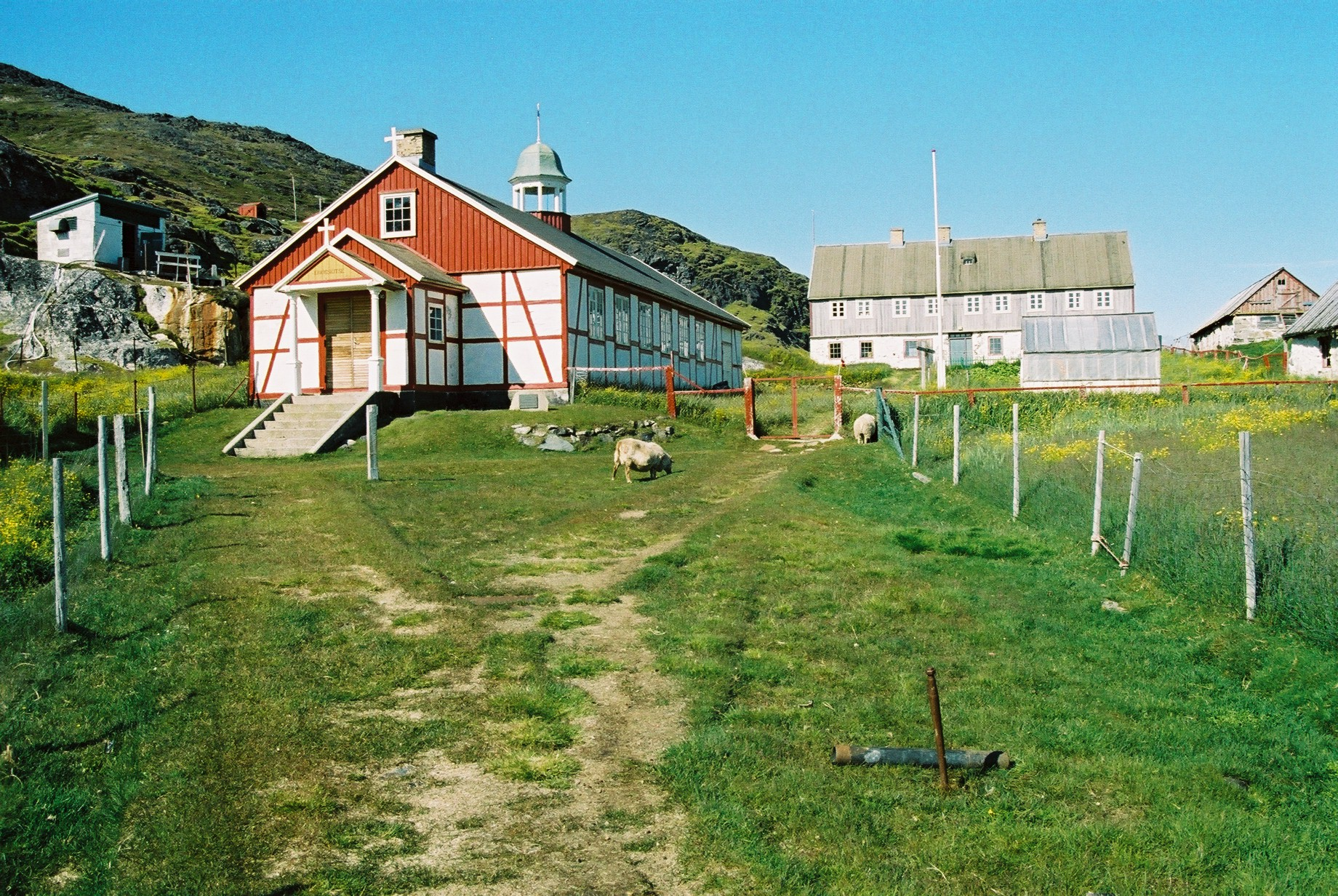
Alluitsoq

Alluitsoq, formerly spelled Agdluitsoĸ, is a former settlement in southern Greenland, located on the Alluitsoq or Lichtenau Fjord near Cape Farewell. It is about 13 kilometers from Ammassivik (Sletten), located on the opposite side of the same fjord.

It was founded as Lichtenau (German: "Light Meadow") by the Moravian missionary Gotfried Grillich and five families in 1774. For a time, it was the largest permanent settlement in Greenland. The mission was surrendered to the Lutheran Church of Denmark in 1900.

The site has a large graveyard and was used as a children's home for the Gertrud Rask Institute between 1942 and 1980. The fjord separates in two at the end. One houses the largest waterfall in Greenland, Qorlortorsuaq, and a trout farm. The other holds a Norse farm's ruins.
