= Matthäus Stach =

Moravian missionary in Greenland (1711–1787)

Matthäus Stach (sometimes anglicized to Matthew Stach) (March 4, 1711, Mankovice – December 21, 1787, Bethabara) was a Moravian missionary in Greenland.

== Life ==
Matthäus Stach was born in Mankendorf in Moravia (today Mankovice in the Czech Republic). He was home schooled since his parents did not want to send the family to attend the Roman Catholic schools. In 1728, he arrived at the Moravian community of Herrnhut in Saxony. In 1733, Stach traveled to Greenland together with Christian David and his cousin Christian Stach where they were greeted by the Danish-Norwegian pioneer missionary Hans Egede. Together they founded the settlements of New Herrnhut (modern Nuuk) and Lichtenfels. In 1741, he made a return trip to Germany where he was both ordained into the ministry and became married.

Matthäus and Rosina Stach left the Greenland mission and returned to Germany in 1771. The following year he was called to the Moravian settlement in Bethabara, North Carolina. Over the rest of his life, he and his wife Rosina operated the local Moravian boys' school. Stach died in 1787 at Bethabara.

== Other sources ==
- Vormbaum, Reinhold (1853) Matthäus Stach und Johann Beck: Missionare der Brüdergemeinde in Grönland und ihre Mitarbeiter (W. H. Scheller)
