= Akunnat =

Akunnaat
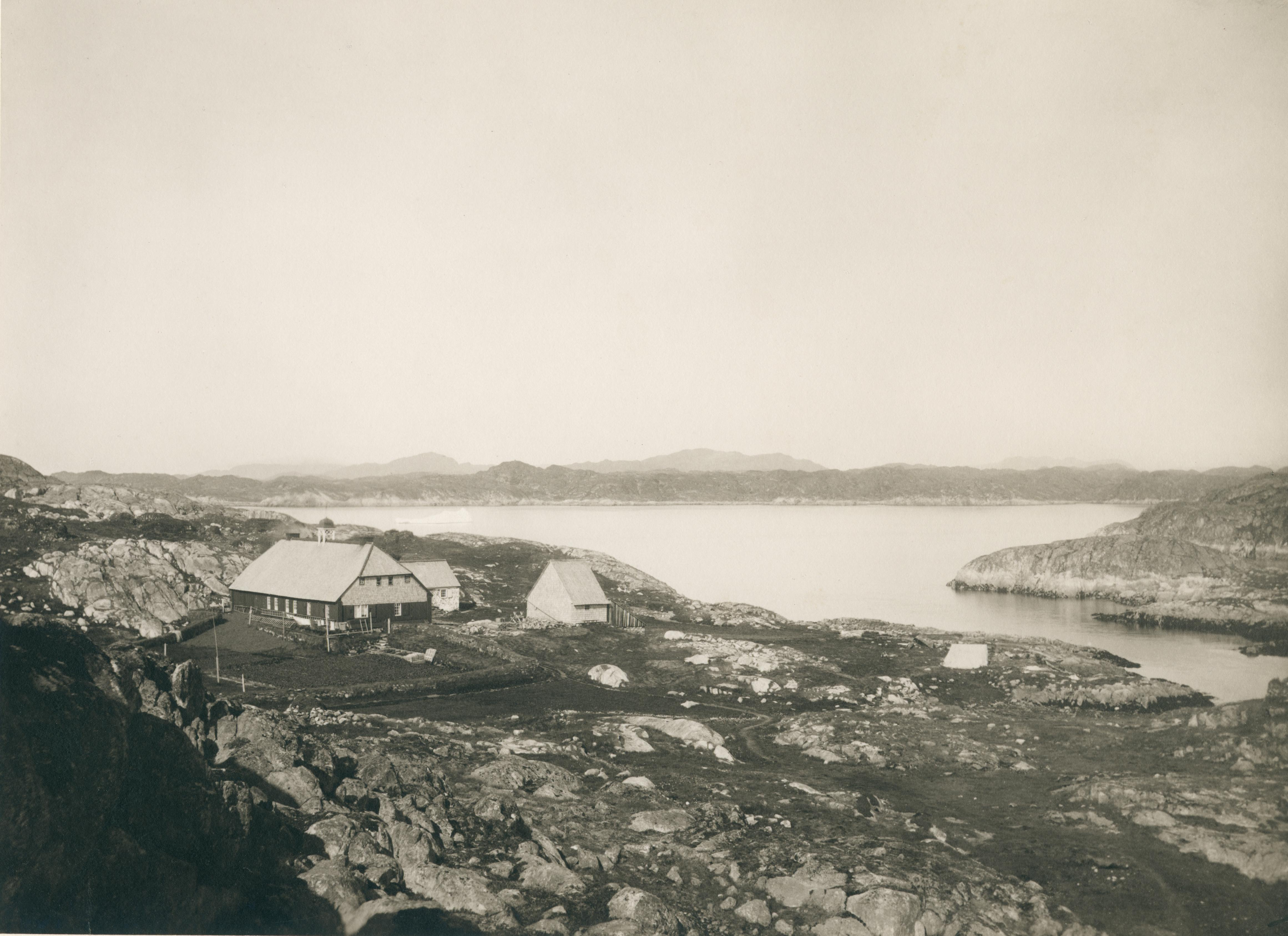
- The Herrnhut mission station Lichtenfels (c.1900)

- Location within Greenland
- Coordinates: 63°03′00″N 50°24′36″W
- State: Kingdom of Denmark
- Constituent country: Greenland
- Municipality: Sermersooq
- Established: 1748–1758
- Time zone: UTC-03

Akunnaat (older spelling: Akúnât) is a former community in southern Greenland on the island of Akonemiok or Qeqertarsuatsiaat, 3 miles (4.8 km) from the trading post of Fisher's Inlet (Danish: Fiskernæsset, the modern settlement of Qeqertarsuatsiaat).

The settlement was founded as the Moravian mission of Lichtenfels (variously translated from the German as "Light Rock", "Light of the Rock", or "Rock of Light") by Matthias Stach, the brothers Jens and Peter Haven, and four Inuit families in 1748, 1754, 1757, or 1758. Following the first conversions in 1760 or 1761, the population of the settlement rose to around 300. The mission was surrendered to the Lutheran Church of Denmark in 1900.
