= Moravian missions in Greenland =

The Moravian missions in Greenland (Greenlandic: Qatanngutigiinniat; Danish: Brødremenigheden; German: Herrnhuters) were established by the Moravian Church or United Brethren and operated between 1733 and 1900. They were operated under the auspices of the Royal Danish College of Missions until its dissolution in 1859 and were finally surrendered to the Lutheran Church of Denmark in 1900. Missionaries were allocated to the region and sometimes even sent wives who had been chosen for them and approved by the drawing of lots, a form of Cleromancy.

== List of missions ==
- Neu-Herrnhut (settled by Matthäus Stach, Christian Stach, and Christian David in 1733 and formally established in 1747 at modern Nuuk)
- Lichtenfels (founded by Matthaeus Stach, Jens Haven, and Peter Haven in 1748, 1754, 1757, or 1758 at modern Akunnat)
- Lichtenau (founded by Gotfried Grillich in 1774 at modern Alluitsoq)
- Friedrichsthal (founded by Conrad Kleinschmidt (1768–1832) in 1824 at modern Narsarmijit)
- Umanak (founded in 1861 and located upfjord from Neu-Herrnhut)
- Idlorpait (founded in 1864 between Lichtenau and Friedrichsthal)

== History ==
A large factor in their favor despite the Danish Mission College's having already named Hans Egede as the director of mission work in the territory was the failure of Egede's own Bergen Greenland Company and a costly debacle involving the royal colony under Major Claus Paarss. Considering Greenland's sparse population, particularly after a smallpox epidemic from 1733 to 1735 brought by an Inuk youth returning from Denmark, – ironically, one of the very same who so inspired Count Zinzendorf to begin the Moravian Church's missions in the first place – the missions were, after a settling-in period, very successful. The United Brotherhood delivered the timber and erected the first church in 1747. Lichtenau was for a time the largest settlement in Greenland. However, the missions were forced to pay for their freight after the Greenland monopoly was granted to the General Trade Company and the Royal Greenland Trading Department's Instruction of 1782 discouraged further urbanization or acculturation of the local Inuit, whose hunting the company depended upon for its income, and greatly hindered further mission work.

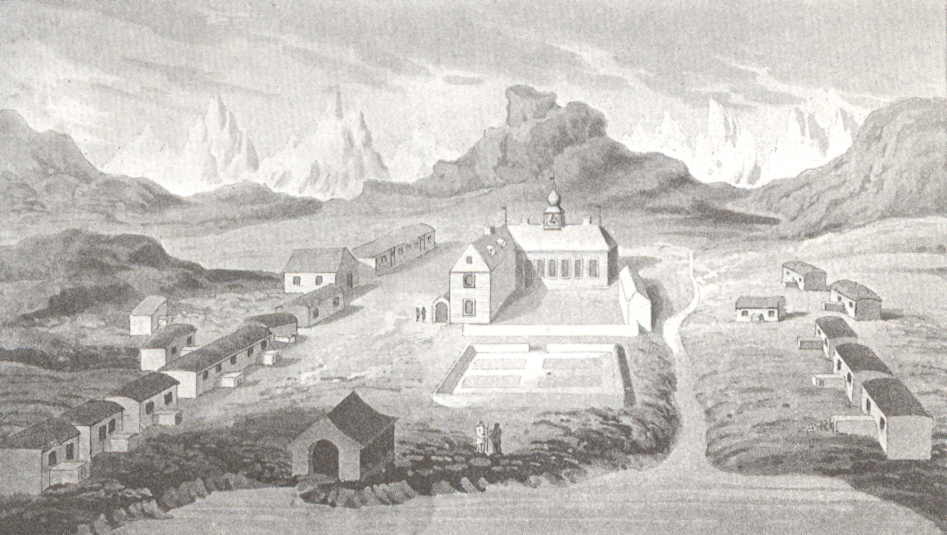
A portrait of the New Herrnhut mission around 1770

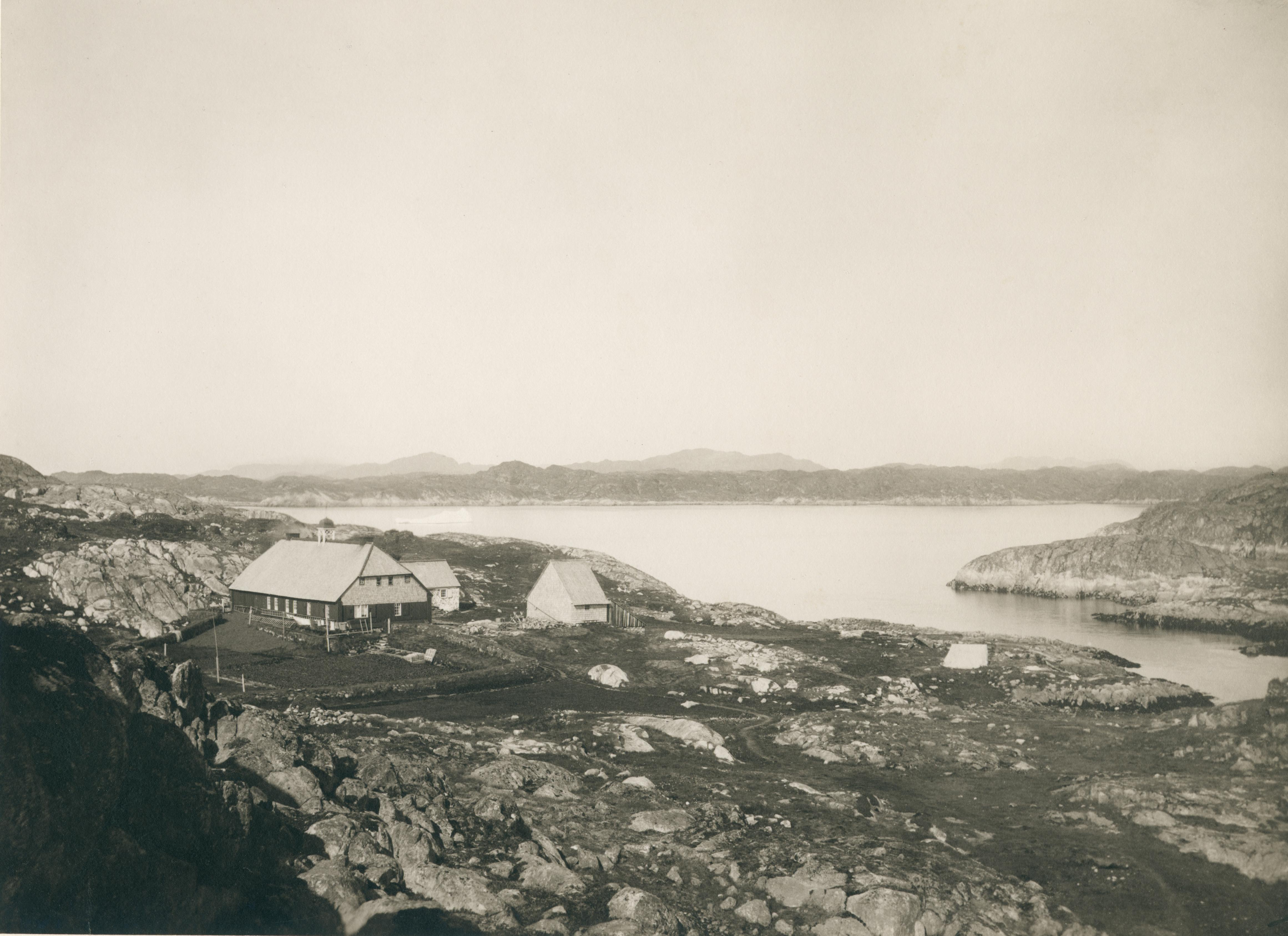
Lichtenfels

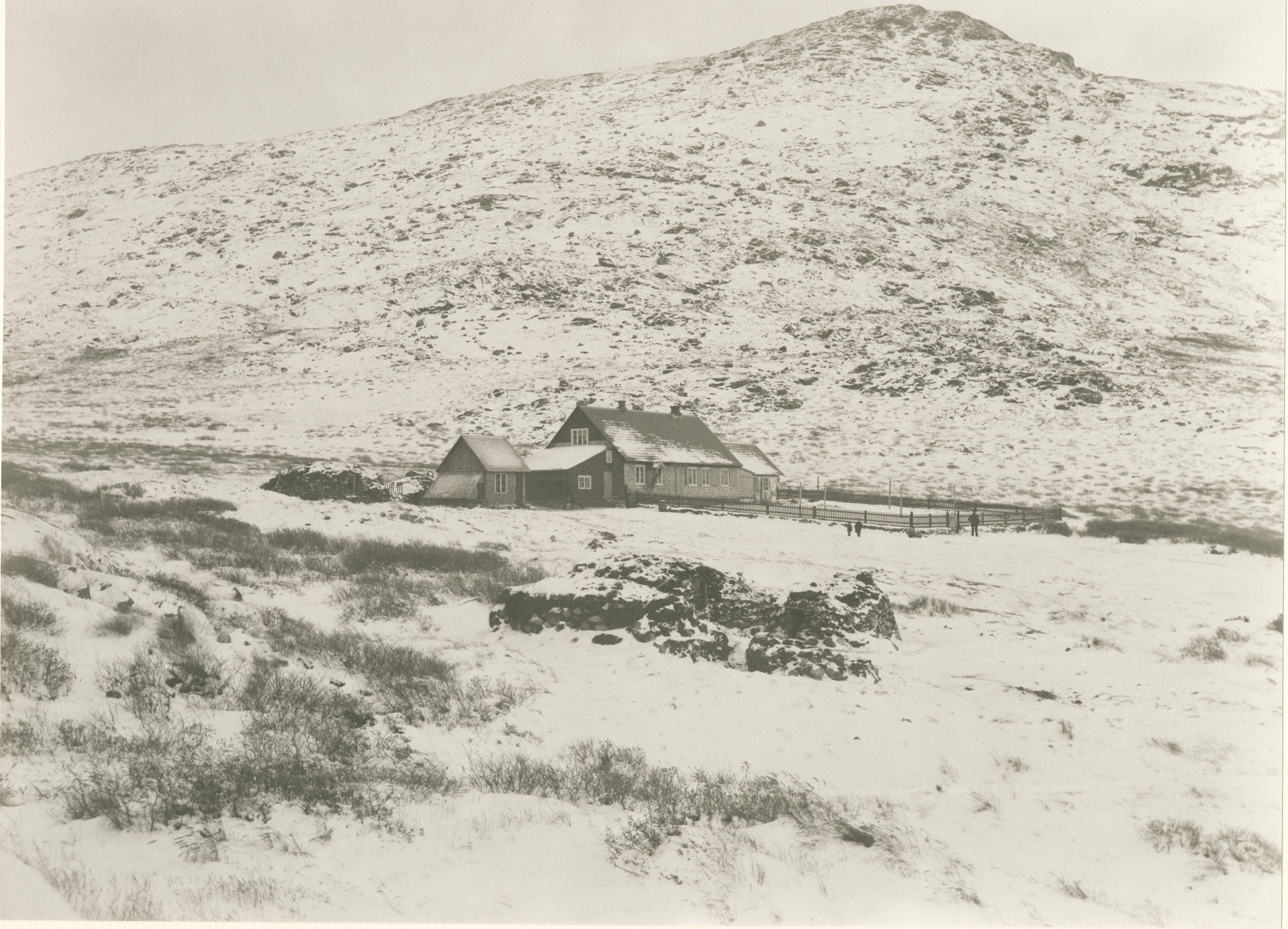
Uummannaq at the bay of Nuuk

== See also ==
- Danish College of Missions
- Island of Hope (Danish: Håbet Ø), Hans Egede's trading-post-cum-Lutheran-mission which developed into Godthåb
- Moravian Brethren Mission House
- Old Nuuk
