= Old Nuuk =

Historic location in Greenland

Coordinates: 64°10′50″N 51°44′30″W

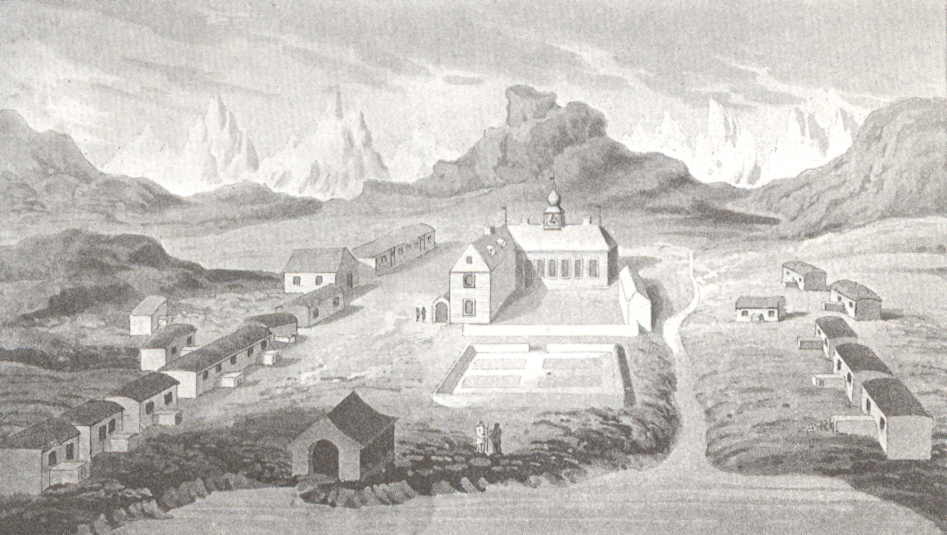
A portrait of the New Herrnhut mission around 1770.

Old Nuuk may refer to several neighborhoods of Nuuk, the capital of Greenland.

The Lutheran mission was originally based on Hope Island at the head of the fjord but was moved to the mainland and christened Godthaab by the royal governor Claus Paarss in 1728.

Dotted with prefabricated, single-family houses, the neighborhood is also host to two of the oldest cemeteries and the Kalaaliaraq Market.

Today, it is part of the Nuuk Centrum district, located in the southwestern part of the town, facing the Nuup Kangerlua fjord. Several historical buildings are located in Old Nuuk:

- Church of our Savior, the Lutheran Nuuk Cathedral (Annaassisitta Oqaluffia)
- Statue of Hans Egede

The Queen Ingrid's Hospital separates Nuuk Centrum and the other old part of Nuuk, the Noorliit area.

Noorliit was formerly the site of the Moravian mission of New Herrnhut (German: Neu-Herrnhut; Danish: Nye-Hernhut). The missionaries Matthaeus Stach, Christian Stach, and Christian David arrived in 1733 and had won enough converts to formally established the settlement in 1747. It was named for the community established by the Count of Zinzendorf at Berthelsdorf in Saxony which became the center of the Moravian Church. The Moravian Brethren Mission House was raised the same year and was the first church to be constructed in Greenland (at that point, the Lutheran mission at Godthaab used a chapel within the main house).

The two missions operated differently and functioned as two separate settlements until the Moravian mission left Greenland in 1900.

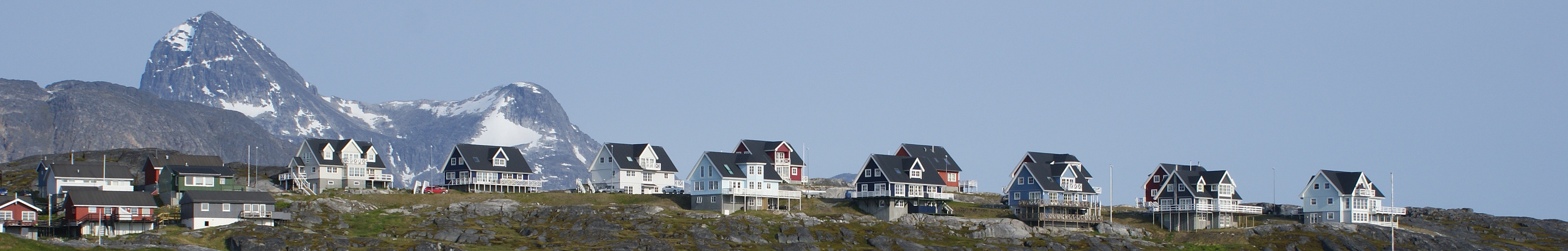
View from the Moravian Brethren Mission House to the east-south-east
