= List of cities and towns in Greenland =

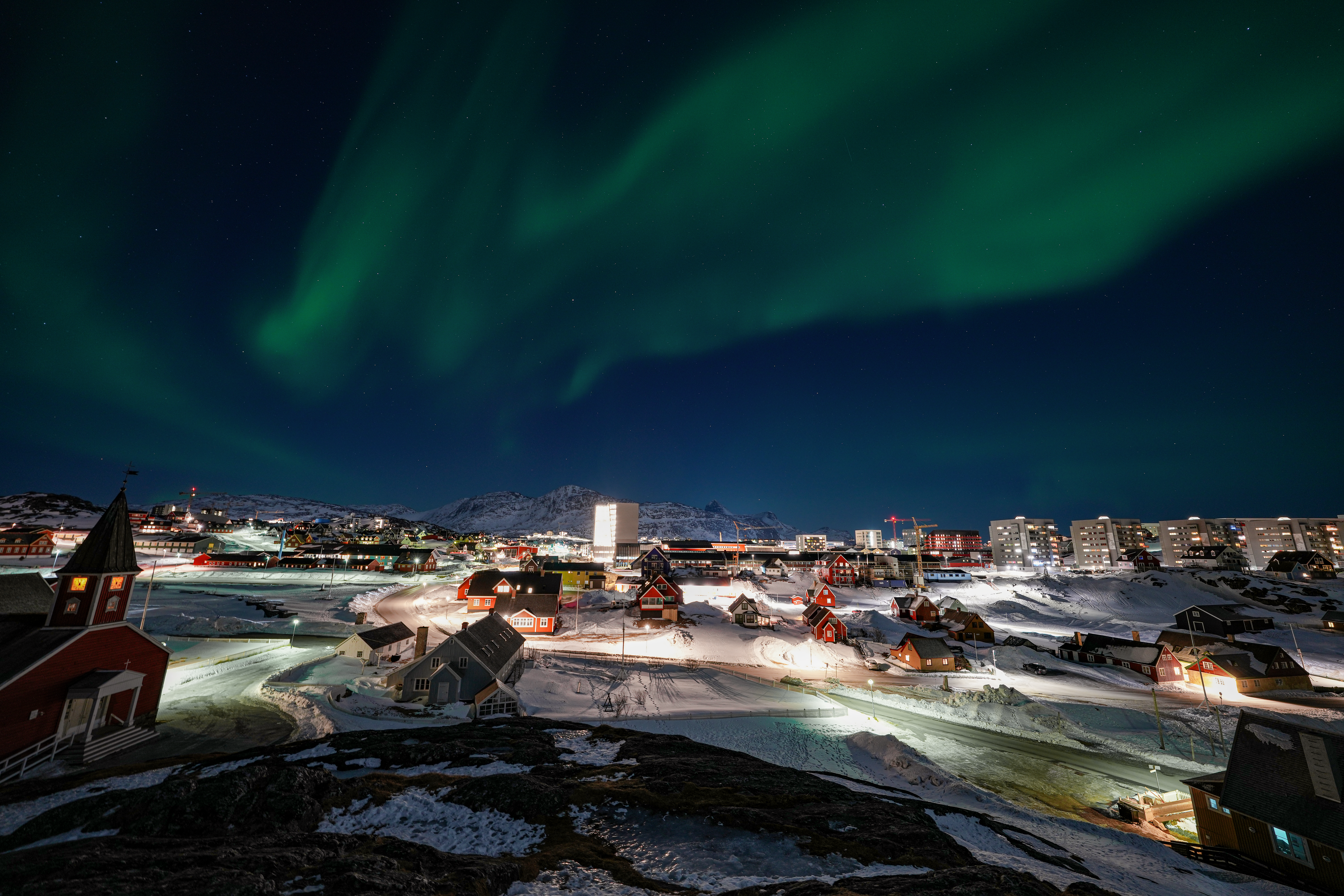
Nuuk (Godthåb) by night in April 2023, Greenland's capital and by far largest city

This is a list of cities and towns in Greenland as of 1 July 2025. In Greenland, two kinds of settled areas are distinguished: illoqarfik (Kalaallisut for 'town'; by in Danish) and nunaqarfik (Kalaallisut for 'settlement'; bygd in Danish). The difference between the two decreased since the new administrative units were introduced in 2009, with the influence of previous municipality centres decreasing. Traditionally, the seat of each municipality was considered a by, whereas every other settlement in a municipality was a bygd. A bygd could have anything from one to about five hundred inhabitants. Many places have Danish names in addition to the Greenlandic names. The Danish name, when applicable, is shown.

== Towns and settlements by population ==
Locations of towns in Greenland with population >10,000 (red), >3,000 (orange), >1,000 (green), and >300 (blue)

As of 1 July 2025 the resident population of Greenland was estimated at 56,831. There are 12 towns in Greenland with a population exceeding 1,000, 14 towns and settlements with a population between 200 and 1,000, 15 settlements with a population between 100 and 200, and 30 settlements with a population below 100.

Rank	Population (Jul. 2025)	Kalaallisut name	Danish name	Municipality
1	20,085	Nuuk	Godthåb	Sermersooq
2	5,526	Sisimiut	Holsteinsborg	Qeqqata
3	5,149	Ilulissat	Jacobshavn	Avannaata
4	3,055	Qaqortoq	Julianehåb	Kujalleq
5	2,978	Aasiaat	Egedesminde	Qeqertalik
6	2,482	Maniitsoq	Sukkertoppen	Qeqqata
7	1,830	Tasiilaq	Oscarshavn	Sermersooq
8	1,391	Uummannaq	Omenak	Avannaata
9	1,242	Narsaq	Nordprøven	Kujalleq
10	1,190	Paamiut	Frederikshåb	Sermersooq
11	1,101	Nanortalik	Bjørnsted	Kujalleq
12	1,087	Upernavik		Avannaata
13	952	Qasigiannguit	Christianshåb	Qeqertalik
14	793	Qeqertarsuaq	Godhavn	Qeqertalik
15	591	Qaanaaq	Thule	Avannaata
16	471	Kangaatsiaq		Qeqertalik
17	441	Kullorsuaq		Avannaata
18	399	Kangerlussuaq	Søndre Strømfjord	Qeqqata
19	334	Ittoqqortoormiit	Scoresbysund	Sermersooq
20	313	Kangaamiut	Gl. Sukkertoppen	Qeqqata
21	256	Tasiusaq		Avannaata
22	241	Saattut	—	Avannaata
23	229	Kuummiit	—	Sermersooq
24	225	Ikerasak	—	Avannaata
25	209	Kulusuk	Kap Dan	Sermersooq
26	204	Niaqornaarsuk	—	Qeqertalik
27	189	Upernavik Kujalleq	Søndre Upernavik	Avannaata
28	185	Attu		Qeqertalik
29	185	Atammik	—	Qeqqata
30	176	Nuussuaq	Kraulshavn	Avannaata
31	175	Qeqertarsuatsiaat	Fiskernæs	Sermersooq
32	172	Sermiligaaq	-	Sermersooq
33	160	Saqqaq	Solsiden	Avannaata
34	158	Aappilattoq, Avannaata		Avannaata
35	156	Qaarsut	—	Avannaata
36	155	Ukkusissat	—	Avannaata
37	148	Innaarsuit	—	Avannaata
38	140	Narsarsuaq	Blomsterdal	Kujalleq
39	131	Alluitsup Paa	Sydprøven	Kujalleq
40	122	Kangersuatsiaq	Prøven	Avannaata
41	101	Itilleq		Qeqqata
42	97	Tiilerilaaq	—	Sermersooq
43	96	Qeqertaq	Øen	Avannaata
44	96	Sarfannguit	—	Qeqqata
45	86	Ikerasaarsuk	—	Qeqertalik
46	85	Aappilattoq, Kujalleq	Rødførde	Kujalleq
47	83	Ikamiut		Qeqertalik
48	79	Arsuk		Sermersooq
49	77	Qassiarsuk	Brattalid Brattahlíð	Kujalleq
50	71	Eqalugaarsuit	—	Kujalleq
51	67	Napasoq	—	Qeqqata
52	60	Iginniarfik	—	Qeqertalik
53	56	Ilimanaq	Claushavn	Avannaata
54	55	Narsarmijit	Frederiksdal	Kujalleq
55	55	Akunnaaq	—	Qeqertalik
56	55	Kitsissuarsuit	Hunde Ejlande	Qeqertalik
57	52	Kapisillit	Lakskaj	Sermersooq
58	51	Isertoq	—	Sermersooq
59	47	Savissivik; Havighivik	—	Avannaata
60	45	Naajaat		Avannaata
61	42	Oqaatsut	Hollandshuk Rødebugt	Avannaata
62	37	Tasiusaq	—	Kujalleq
63	36	Nutaarmiut	—	Avannaata
64	34	Siorapaluk; Hiurapaluk	—	Avannaata
65	31	Igaliku	Garðar; Igaliko	Kujalleq
66	29	Ammassivik	Sletten	Kujalleq
67	29	Niaqornat	—	Avannaata
68	27	Saarloq	—	Kujalleq
69	26	Qeqertat	—	Avannaata
70	12	Qassimiut	Bødker	Kujalleq
71	4	Kangerluk	Diskofjord	Qeqertalik

== See also ==
- Abandoned sites in Greenland
