= Nanortalik Municipality =

Nanortalik Municipality Kommune Nanortalik
- Municipality
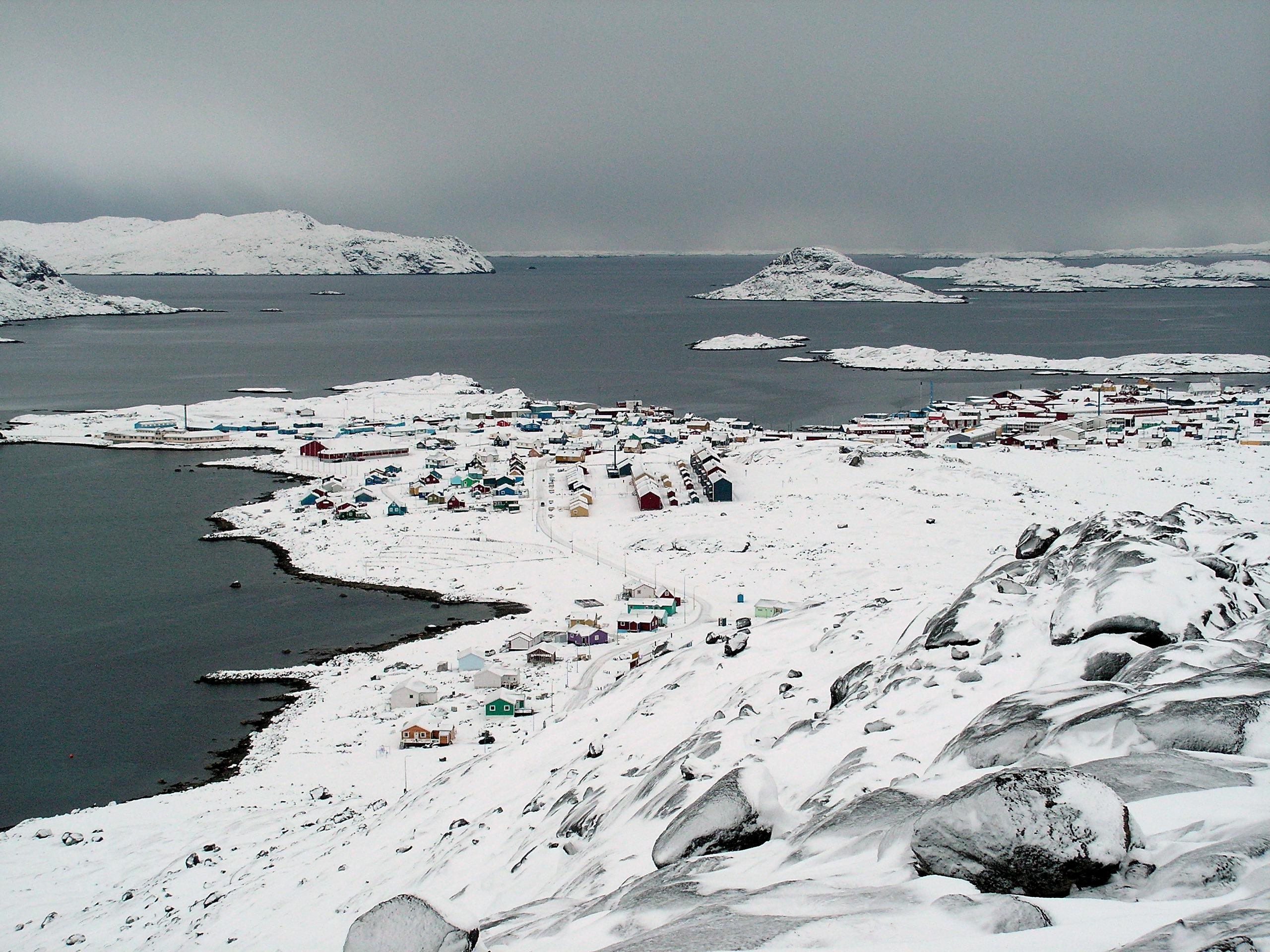
- Wintertime view of Nanortalik from nearby Ravnefjeldet

- Location of the municipality in Greenland
- Coordinates (Nanortalik Commune): 61°00′N 45°00′W
- State: Kingdom of Denmark
- Constituent country: Greenland
- Municipality: Kujalleq
- Established: 1 January 2009
- Municipal center: Nanortalik
- Time zone: UTC-03
- Calling code: +299
- ISO 3166 code: GL-KU
- Website: nanortalik.gl

Nanortalik Municipality was a municipality in south Greenland, a sub-division of the Kujalleq municipality.

== Towns and settlements ==
=== Nanortalik area ===
- Nanortalik (Nennortalik)
- Aappilattoq
- Alluitsup Paa (Sydprøven)
- Ammassivik (Sletten)
- Narsarmijit (Frederiksdal, Narsaq Kujalleq)
- Tasiusaq
- Qorlortorsuaq
