= Qaqortoq Municipality =

Qaqortoq Municipality Kommune Qaqortoq
- Municipality
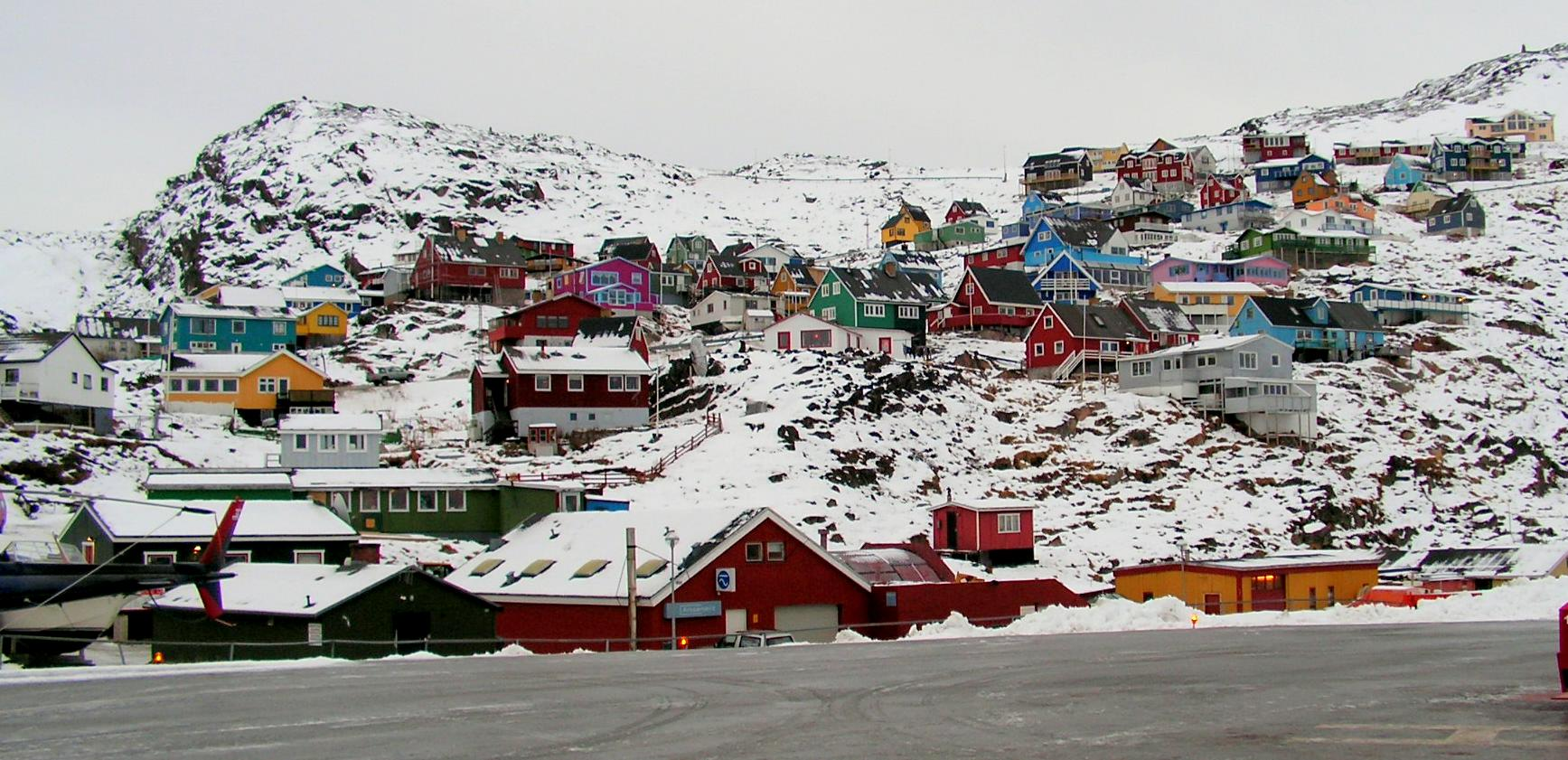
- Qaqortoq

- Flag Coat of arms

- Location of the municipality in Greenland
- Coordinates (Qaqortoq Commune): 60°43′N 46°02′W
- State: Kingdom of Denmark
- Constituent country: Greenland
- Municipality: Kujalleq
- Established: 1 January 2009
- Municipal center: Qaqortoq
- Time zone: UTC-03
- Calling code: +299
- ISO 3166 code: GL-KU
- Website: nanortalik.gl

Qaqortoq Municipality was a municipality in south Greenland, a sub-division of the Kujalleq municipality.

== Towns and settlements ==
- Qaqortoq (Julianehåb)
- Eqalugaarsuit
- Qassimiut
- Saarloq
