= Vatnahverfi =

District in the Norse Greenlanders' Eastern Settlement

Vatnahverfi (West Greenlandic: Tasikuluulik) was a district in the Norse Greenlanders’ Eastern Settlement (Eystribyggð) and is generally regarded by archaeologists and historians as having the best pastoral land in the colony. The Norse settled Vatnahverfi in the late 10th century and farmed there for nearly 500 years before mysteriously disappearing from the district and the entirety of Greenland, likely at some point in the latter 15th century. Its name is roughly translated as “Lake District."

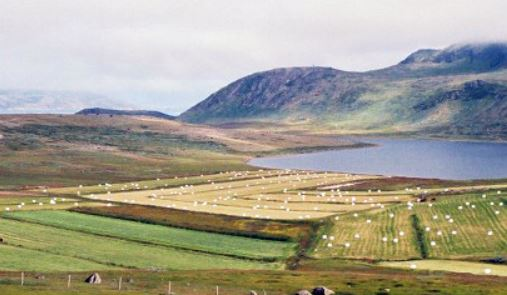
Pastoral land in Vatnahverfi. Modern farms in the district are almost invariably situated on former Norse sites.

== Placement ==
Located on Greenland's southwest coast, Vatnahverfi can be broadly thought of as a peninsula stretching northeast from the Labrador Sea to the Jespersens Glacier some 60 km inland and covering approximately 500 km^{2}. It lies between Einarsfjord (today the fjord and the settlement at the fjord's head are both called Igaliku) and Hrafnsfjord (today called Agdluitsoq). The heart of peninsula (60.732307, -45.458640) is approximately 140 km northwest of Greenland's southernmost tip at Cape Farewell.

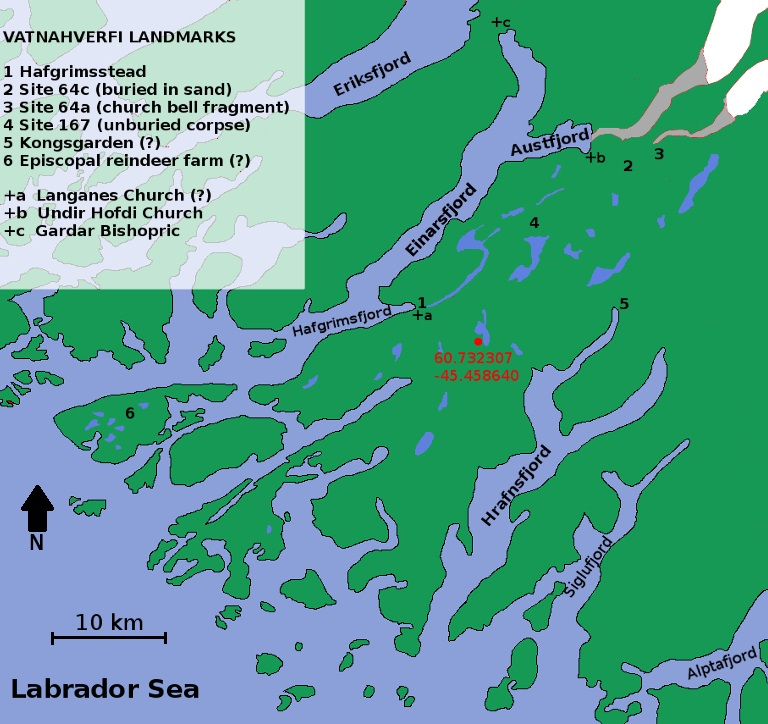
Major landmarks in Vatnahverfi

== Settlement ==
During the Norse period, Vatnahverfi was initially settled by kinsmen of Erik the Red who accompanied him in a large exodus out of Iceland in 985 AD. The Greenlander's Saga states that “men who went abroad with Eirik took possession of land in Greenland” and includes in a list of founding chieftains a man named Hafgrim who claimed “Hafgrímsfjörð and Vatnahverfi.” A similar account can also be found in the Landnámabók (Book of Settlements).

Erik and his kinsmen usually established their homesteads away from the Labrador Sea, preferring the inland heads of Greenland's southwest fjords where the temperature was milder and the land better suited to their pastoral way of life. This was largely the case in Vatnahverfi too, with the majority of its homesteads situated in the northern half of the peninsula 30 km or more away from the ocean (though the fjords gave them easy access to it). One point of difference with Vatnahverfi in this regard is that many of its farms were also situated inland on lakes and rivers rather than just on the fjords, as was generally the case in other districts. Archaeologists have identified the remains of 50 Norse farms in Vatnahverfi alone, comprising 10% of the known farms in the Eastern Settlement as a whole. Its population is estimated to have been an average of 8 to 10 individuals per farm - approximately 500 total - during the colony's zenith.

The greatest concentration of Vatnahverfi's farms lay between Hafgrimsfjord and Austfjord (both of which are branches of Einarsfjord) on the peninsula's northwest portion. Hafgrim himself likely settled at the head of his namesake fjord where ruins of a large homestead can still be seen. He and his descendants would have been considered the de facto chieftains of the district. The homestead also featured a small church, believed by Helge Ingstad to be the Langanes church described in the Saga of Einar Sokkeson. The area is called Eqaluit (“salmon-place”) by modern Inuit Greenlanders.

The area near the head of Austfjord (today called Sondre Igaliku or Igaliku Kujalleq) further north was also an important hub in Vatnahverfi, presumably due to its close proximity and easy access by foot or boat to Gardar about 15 km to the northwest, where the colony's bishopric and Althing parliament were located. As with Hafgrimsfjord there was a small church in Austfjord, called Undir Hofdi. A lump of heat-fused clay and glass found in the ruins of the church suggests that it was burnt at some point, as was possibly the case with larger churches in Brattahlid, Gardar, and Herjolfsnes.

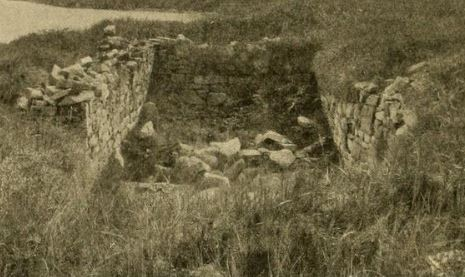
Ruins of the Undir Hofdi church

The district's farms appear to have been quite rich and productive. Archaeological excavations revealed that the Norse settlers of Vatnahverfi raised cattle, sheep, goats and pigs, and also kept horses and dogs.

The Norwegian crown owned a property called Kongsgarden at the head of Hrafnsfjord in an area called Foss (waterfalls), which was said to be a rich salmon run.

== Documented history ==
In addition to the references in The Greenlander's Saga and Landnámabók, Vatnahverfi was the likely setting of an event described in the Saga of Einar Sokkeson, where the protagonist killed a visiting Norwegian merchant during a banquet with the tacit approval of Bishop Arnold. A Norwegian priest named Ivar Bardarson, who lived in the colony in the mid-14th century as a representative of the Archdiocese of Nidaros and the Norwegian crown, noted in his account titled Descriptions of Greenland of the abundant fish in the district's lakes. Bardarson also referenced an island named "Renøe" (Caribo Island) which was said to be an episcopal reindeer farm owned by the Gardar bishopric. Archeologists believe this may have been located on what is now called Akia, an island about 26 km southwest of Hafgrimsfjord.

== Aboriginal contact ==
Although various branches of Paleo-Eskimos had lived in Greenland as far back as 2500 BC, they are believed to have almost entirely abandoned the island by the time of the initial Norse arrival. The Little Climatic Optimum was then in full force and would have made the Norse areas of settlement on the southwest coast particularly unattractive to arctic hunter-gatherers such as the Dorset. In fact, it is believed that the Norse Greenlanders’ first contact with North American aboriginals was not in Greenland at all, but rather with the Beothuk in Newfoundland as described in The Greenlanders Saga and Erik the Red’s Saga. Subsequent generations of Norse Greelanders began encountering the Dorset and later the Thule Inuit in the Northsetur hunting districts far to the north of their settlements, where walrus and narwhal ivory could be obtained. The Thule (who began displacing the Dorset in North America's arctic around 1000 AD) eventually arrived in the areas of Norse settlement as the Little Ice Age allowed them to increase their southern range, at a time when the Norse presence in Greenland was coming to an end. Oral histories from the Inuit tell of both friendship and hostility between the two peoples.

Archeologists have noted the one-sided nature of Norse and Aboriginal material exchange: Norse artifacts have been found in a wide distribution of Aboriginal sites in Greenland and the high arctic surrounding Baffin Bay, but extremely few Aboriginal artifacts have turned up in Norse sites. One such example is a Dorset culture harpoon head, circa 11th/12th century, that was discovered in a Norse midden in the Vatnahverfi district.

== Disappearance ==
Having endured for nearly a half-millennium, the exact fate of the Norse settlers in Vatnahverfi and the rest of Greenland remains unknown, although several factors were likely involved. The Greenlanders' pastoral way of life would have been severely challenged by the onset of the Little Ice Age, much more so than their counterparts in Europe. DNA analysis of the Norse Greenlanders' remains from the final known generations shows that marine-based protein - especially from seals - became an increasingly large part of their diet, even in pastoral areas like Vatnahverfi, whereas remains dating from Erik the Red's landnám period showed that most of their diet was land-based. Citing the extremely low volume of fish bones uncovered during midden excavations, historian Jared Diamond argued that the Greenland Norse may have developed a cultural taboo against eating fish, shunning an abundant source of food that could have been tapped when their pastoral way of life began to deteriorate. Other theories include the possibility of conflict with the Thule and predation by European pirates. There is no indication from archaeology or human remains that the Norse intermarried with the Thule or adopted their way of life, nor any record from Iceland or Norway that hints of an exodus out of Greenland.

Historical records do suggest that ships from Europe arrived less frequently owing to the worsening sea conditions. The traditional Norse route to reach Greenland was to sail due west from Iceland’s Snæfellsnes peninsula until reaching eastern Greenland’s Ammassalik district, then sailing south along the coast to reach the settlements on the other side of Cape Farewell. However, by the mid-1300s, Ivar Bardarson noted that the quantity of ice from the northeast was such that “no one sails this old route without putting their life in danger.” The Norwegian Crown in Oslo and Roman Catholic Archdiocese of Nidaros eventually abandoned the colony to its own devices, although some Popes were aware of the situation. In 1448, Pope Nicholas V wrote about the diocese in Greenland ("a region situated at the uttermost end of the earth"), in which he lamented reports that it had been without a resident Bishop for some 30 years. These concerns were echoed in a letter dated circa 1500 by Pope Alexander VI, who believed that no communion had been performed in Greenland for a century, and that no ship had visited there in the past 80 years. However, even after the colony was forsaken by the Church, the empty title "Bishop of Gardar" continued to be held by a succession of at least 18 individuals well into the 16th century, none of whom visited their nominal diocese and only one of whom (Bishop Mattias Knutsson) reportedly expressed any desire to do so.

Some sites in Vatnahverfi give clues as to the fate of its Norse inhabitants. A farm located a few kilometres inland from Austfjord (farm site 64c) had been covered in layers of drifting sand up to 10 feet deep, suggesting that Norse farming and deforestation had left parts of the area vulnerable to erosion and desertification. At another nearby homestead (farm site 64a), one of the recovered artifacts was a piece of a church bell, which suggests that the Norse continued to live in Greenland after some of the churches were destroyed. At another large inland farm about halfway between Hafgrimsfjord and Austfjord (farm site 167), archaeologists found the remains of a solitary Norse Greenlander who appears to have lain down and died in the entrance way of the house, the implication being that there was nobody else left to bury him. At the same farm, a piece of imported Rhenish pottery was uncovered.

== Modern times ==
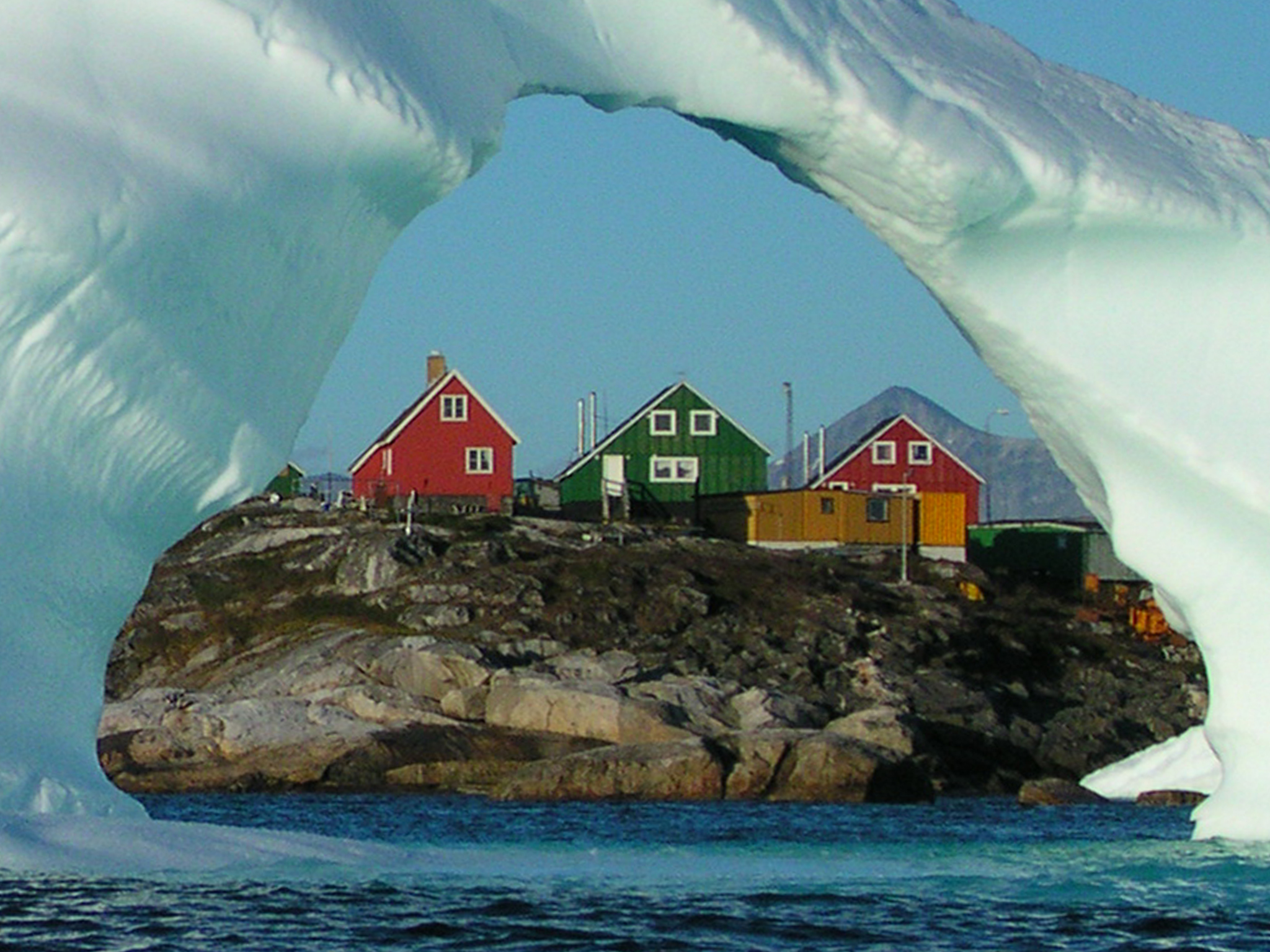
The modern settlement Alluitsup Paa in Vatnahverfi

Throughout the former Eystribyggðand in Greenland, the old Norse place names have been largely replaced by Inuit ones, but "Vatnahverfi" is still widely used on current maps of the peninsula. Present-day settlements in the district include Alluitsup Paa on Agdluitsoq (Hrafnsfjord), Eqalugarssuit near Igaliku (Einarsfjord) and Saarloq on the southwest tip of the peninsula facing the Labrador Sea, reflecting the pattern of the Thule culture and the modern Greenlanders descended from them generally preferring the ocean-ends of the fjords rather than the inland heads. The part of Vatnahverfi most favoured by the Norse – from Hafgrimsfjord to Austfjord – is today called Tasikuluulik and though less populated it is still in use by modern Greenlanders, primarily for sheep farming and a bit of agriculture. In 2017, the Tasikuluulik portion of Vatnahverfi was one of five areas collectively called "Kujataa Greenland" named as a UNESCO World Heritage Site, described as a place where "two cultures, European Norse and Inuit, created a cultural landscape based on farming, grazing and marine mammal hunting. The landscape represents the earliest introduction of farming to the Arctic, and the Norse expansion of settlement beyond Europe."

== Fictional depiction ==
Jane Smiley’s 1988 novel The Greenlanders is set in 14th century Vatnahverfi, and incorporates some of Norse Greenland's historically known settlements, landmarks, events and people into the fictional plot. The Vatnahverfi farmers are portrayed as the colony's wealthiest and proudest inhabitants.
