= Kiista P. Isaksen =

Greenlandic politician

Member of the Greenlandic Parliament
- In office 2003–2005

Personal details
- Born: 24 July 1972 (age 53) Nuuk, Greenland, Kingdom of Denmark
- Citizenship: Kingdom of Denmark
- Party: Siumut

Kiista "Kiiki" P. Isaksen (born 24 July 1972) is a Greenlandic politician (Siumut).

== Early life and career ==
Kiista P. Isaksen was born in Nuuk on 24 July 1972, the daughter of midwife Nuka Poulsen.

Isaksen graduated from school in Qaqortoq in 1989 and then studied psychology and pedagogy at the social college in Thy. She trained as a social counselor from 1991 to 1994 and then worked as such for the Narsaq community. From 1995 to 1997, she was head of the crèche. She then trained to be a teacher for two years, but nevertheless began to work again as a social counselor for the community, in a managerial position from 2001.

== Political career ==
In the municipal elections of 2001, Isaksen was elected to the Narsaq Municipality Council. She also stood as a candidate in the 2002 parliamentary election and came fourth representing Siumut, from where she sat in the Inatsisartut several times between 2003 and 2005. In the 2005 local elections, she received the most votes of any candidate in Narsaq Municipality and was appointed mayor. In the parliamentary elections of 2005, she no longer ran because of her mayoral activity. In the local elections of 2008, she was elected to the council of the new municipality of Kujalleq.

In 2009, Isaksen resumed her work as a social counselor. In 2011 she became head of social affairs for the municipality, specialist adviser in 2015 and in 2016 head of children and youth for the municipality of Kujalleq. She was re-elected in the 2013 local elections. Four years later, she received the most votes in the local elections and was elected Mayor of Kujalleq. In the 2021 local elections, the Siumut lost power to the Inuit Ataqatigiit and Isaksen was replaced as mayor by Stine Egede.

== Personal life ==
On 27 December 1992, Isaksen married hospital administrator Thorvald Isaksen (b. 1971), with whom she has three children and two grandchildren.
