= Stine Egede =

Greenlandic politician

Member of the Greenlandic Parliament
- In office 13 March 2013 – 2021

Personal details
- Born: 18 September 1964 (age 61) Narsaq, Greenland, Kingdom of Denmark
- Citizenship: Kingdom of Denmark
- Party: Inuit Ataqatigiit (IA)
- Profession: Police officer

Stine Egede Nørbæk (born 18 September 1964) is a Greenlandic politician (Inuit Ataqatigiit) and police officer.

== Early life and career ==
Stine Egede was born in Narsaq but grew up in Igaliku. From 1985 to 1988, she worked as an office assistant. She then worked as a police officer until 2011. She ran Qaqortoq Prison from 2011 to 2012 before returning to work as a police officer. She is the chairwoman of the board of directors of the Akilliit home for neglected children.

== Political career ==
Egede ran for a seat in the Inatsisartut the first time in the 2013 parliamentary elections, but only came second with 88 votes. She had better luck in the local elections that same year, where she received 235 votes for her party in the municipality of Kujalleq and thus entered the local council. She was able to repeat this result in 2017, when she achieved the second most of all candidates with 313 votes. In the 2018 parliamentary elections, she received 99 votes and finished in first place in the Inatsisartut. In the 2021 general election, she received 133 votes and returned to parliament. At the same time, however, she received by far the best result in the local elections in the municipality of Kujalleq, with 410 votes. As a result, she was appointed mayor of the municipality and took a leave of absence from parliament.
