= Malene Vahl Rasmussen =

Greenlandic politician (born 1994)

Member of Parliament of Greenland
- In office May 2018 – 2025

Mayor of Kujalleq
- Incumbent
- Assumed office 2025

Personal details
- Born: 22 November 1994 (age 31) Qaqortoq, Greenland
- Citizenship: Kingdom of Denmark
- Party: Democrats

Malene Vahl Rasmussen (born 22 November 1994) is a Greenlandic politician, and was a member of the Inatsisartut. She was elected mayor of Kujalleq in 2025.
