= Saarloq =

- Settlement
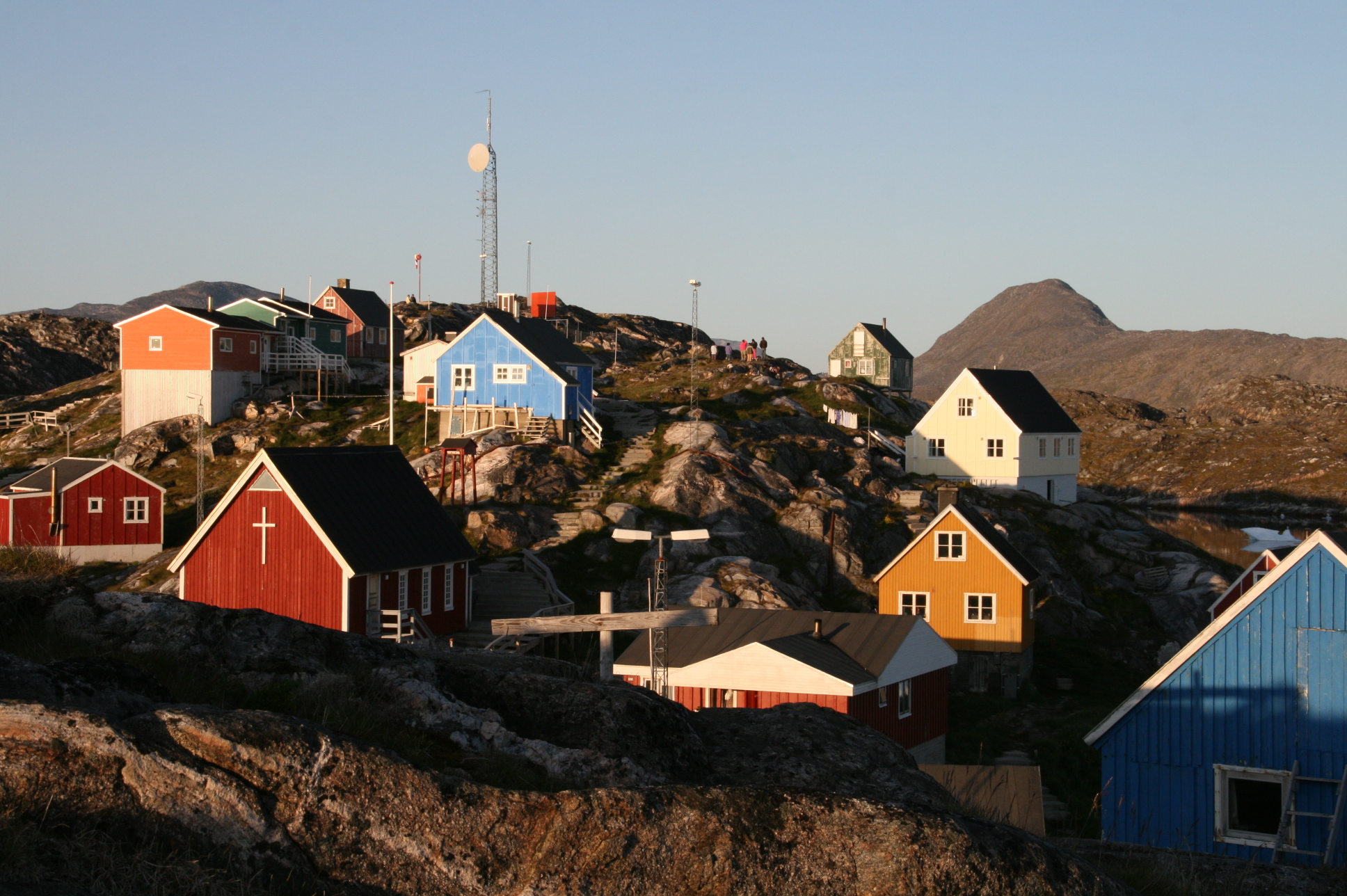
- Saarloq

- Location within Greenland
- Coordinates: 60°32′15″N 46°01′33″W
- State: Kingdom of Denmark
- Constituent country: Greenland
- Municipality: Kujalleq

Government
  - Mayor: Jenseeraq Hansen
- Elevation: 0.91 m (3 ft)

Population (2025)
  - Total: 27
- Time zone: UTC−02:00 (WGT)
  - Summer (DST): UTC−01:00 (WGST)
- Postal code: 3920 Qaqortoq

Saarloq is a settlement in the Kujalleq municipality in southern Greenland. Its population was 21 in 2020. It is located on a small island with the same name off the Labrador Sea coast, at the mouth of the Qaqortoq Fjord, west of Alluitsup Paa and 20 km south of Qaqortoq.

The settlement is the southernmost of the three settlements—along Eqalugaarsuit and Qassimiut—that made up the former Qaqortoq municipality. The settlements are presently governed by a joint settlement council.

On 1 January 2009 the settlement became part of the Kujalleq municipality, when the Narsaq, Qaqortoq, and Nanortalik municipalities ceased to exist.

== Transport ==
The village is served by the Saarloq Heliport. Air Greenland district helicopters link the settlement with Nanortalik, and further to Qaqortoq and Narsarsuaq.

== Infrastructure and communications ==
The settlement has its own church, and a school—Atuarfik Saarloq, Greenlandic for "school of Saarloq"—with 5 to 6 pupils.

There are no cars in the settlement, and there is no heliport; weekly helicopter connections land on a tundra plain. Further transportation is by sea. Internet and phone communications are provided by the Home Rule government.

Drinking water is provided by desalination of the sea water. The settlement has three 1,100 liter fresh water tanks for this purpose.

== Population ==
Most towns and settlements in southern Greenland exhibit negative growth patterns over the last two decades, with many settlements rapidly depopulating. The population of Saarloq has decreased nearly a half relative to the 1990 levels, by nearly a third relative to the 2000 levels. If the trend continues much further, the settlement is likely to close in the future.

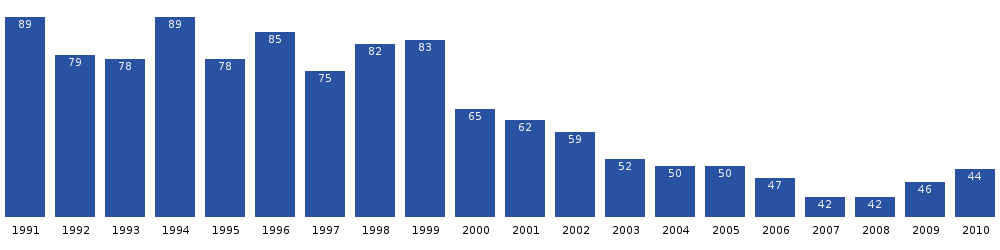
Saarloq population growth dynamics in the last two decades. Source: Statistics Greenland
