= Eqalugaarsuit =

Settlement in Kujalleq, Greenland

- Location within Greenland
- Coordinates: 60°37′20″N 45°54′35″W
- State: Kingdom of Denmark
- Constituent country: Greenland
- Municipality: Kujalleq

Government
  - Mayor: Lars Boassen

Population (2025)
  - Total: 71
- Time zone: UTC−02:00 (Western Greenland Time)
  - Summer (DST): UTC−01:00 (Western Greenland Summer Time)
- Postal code: 3920 Qaqortoq

Eqalugaarsuit (old spelling: Eqalugârssuit) is a settlement in the Kujalleq municipality in southern Greenland, located southeast of Qaqortoq and northwest of Alluitsup Paa. It had a population of 49 in 2020.

Until January 2009, the settlement — along Qassimiut and Saarloq, as well as 13 sheep farms — belonged to the Qaqortoq municipality. On 1 January 2009 the settlement became part of the Kujalleq municipality, and the Narsaq, Qaqortoq, and Nanortalik municipalities ceased to exist. The settlements are presently governed by a joint settlement council.

== Economy ==
The main occupations in Eqalugaarsuit are hunting and fishing. There are currently plans of introducing muskox to the surrounding area, as a source of food and traditional hide, called qiviut, and as a tourist attraction.

== Infrastructure ==
The settlement has two general stores, operated by KNI. There is also a church, a service house, and a home for the elderly. The settlement has its own school--Daanialiup atuarfia— with approximately 30 pupils. The school consists of three classrooms, a kitchen, and an office. The settlement has its own soccer field.

There are no cars in the settlement. The only form of motorized transportation is by tractors or 4-wheel-drive buggies. The settlement has a heliport. The harbour has a wharf, a port, and a separate fishing dock.

== Population ==
Most towns and settlements in southern Greenland exhibit negative growth patterns over the last two decades, with many settlements rapidly depopulating. The population of Eqalugaarsuit has decreased nearly a third relative to the 1990 levels, and over 12 percent relative to the 2000 levels.

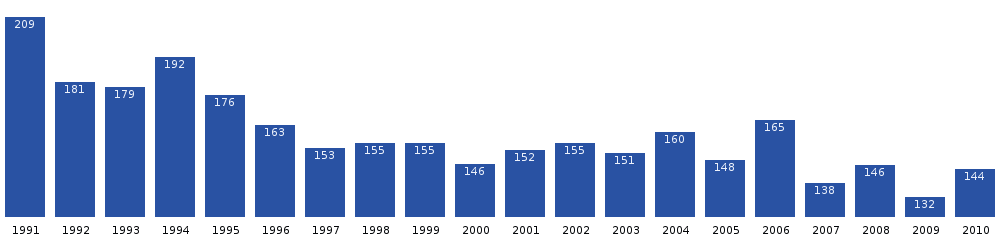
Eqalugaarsuit population growth dynamics in the last two decades. Source: Statistics Greenland
