= Qassimiut =

Settlement in Greenland

Qassimiut Bødker
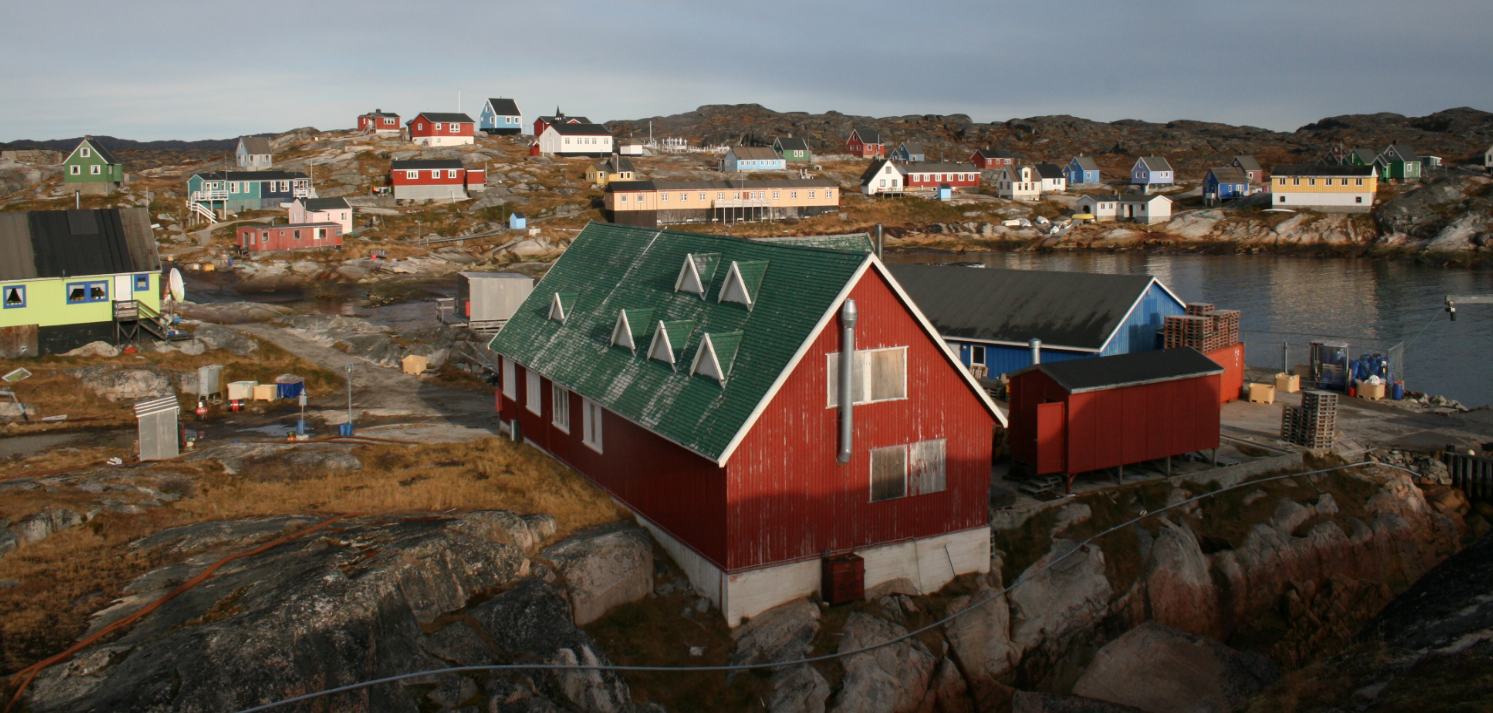
- View of Qassimiut

- Location within Greenland
- Coordinates: 60°46′53″N 47°09′35″W
- State: Kingdom of Denmark
- Constituent country: Greenland
- Municipality: Kujalleq

Population (2025)
  - Total: 12
- Time zone: UTC−02:00 (Western Greenland Time)
  - Summer (DST): UTC−01:00 (Western Greenland Summer Time)
- Postal code: 3920 Qaqortoq

Qassimiut, also known by its Danish name Bødker, is a settlement in the Kujalleq municipality in southern Greenland. The settlement was founded in 1835 as a trading station. With a population of 12 in 2025, it is the smallest organised, permanent settlement in Greenland.

Until January 2009, the settlement—along Eqalugaarsuit and Saarloq, as well as 13 sheep farms—belonged to Qaqortoq municipality. On 1 January 2009 the settlement became part of Kujalleq municipality, when the Narsaq, Qaqortoq, and Nanortalik municipalities ceased to exist. The settlements are presently governed by a joint settlement council, although Qassimiut has no direct representation in the council. It was founded in 1835 by Julianehåb buisnesmann Frederik Lassen, with Bødker Peter Bendtsen as first bestyrer.

== Healthcare and infrastructure ==
The healthcare services for the settlement are provided by the Napparsimavik Hospital in Qaqortoq. The hospital boat regularly visits the settlement, and an emergency helicopter is available if needed.

KNI subsidiary Pilersuisoq operates a local, all-purpose general store in the settlement.

== Climate ==
Qassimiut experiences a tundra climate (Köppen: ET), with short, cool summers and long, cold winters.

Climate data for Qassimiut (Nunarsuit) (62.57°N 50.40°W) (20 m (66 ft) AMSL) (1991-2020 data)
Month	Jan	Feb	Mar	Apr	May	Jun	Jul	Aug	Sep	Oct	Nov	Dec	Year
Record high °C (°F)	16.9 (62.4)	10.2 (50.4)	10.5 (50.9)	10.3 (50.5)	14.6 (58.3)	14.1 (57.4)	16.3 (61.3)	15.6 (60.1)	20.3 (68.5)	14.6 (58.3)	12.7 (54.9)	12.0 (53.6)	20.3 (68.5)
Mean daily maximum °C (°F)	−1.9 (28.6)	−2.7 (27.1)	−2.2 (28.0)	0.5 (32.9)	2.6 (36.7)	4.5 (40.1)	6.0 (42.8)	6.5 (43.7)	5.2 (41.4)	3.1 (37.6)	0.7 (33.3)	−0.9 (30.4)	1.8 (35.2)
Daily mean °C (°F)	−3.5 (25.7)	−4.3 (24.3)	−3.7 (25.3)	−0.9 (30.4)	1.2 (34.2)	2.9 (37.2)	4.4 (39.9)	5.0 (41.0)	4.0 (39.2)	1.9 (35.4)	−0.6 (30.9)	−2.2 (28.0)	0.4 (32.7)
Mean daily minimum °C (°F)	−5.1 (22.8)	−5.9 (21.4)	−5.2 (22.6)	−2.2 (28.0)	−0.1 (31.8)	1.4 (34.5)	2.8 (37.0)	3.5 (38.3)	2.9 (37.2)	0.8 (33.4)	−1.9 (28.6)	−3.6 (25.5)	−1.1 (30.0)
Record low °C (°F)	−16.3 (2.7)	−19.4 (−2.9)	−18.5 (−1.3)	−11.2 (11.8)	−10.1 (13.8)	−4.3 (24.3)	−3.2 (26.2)	−2.7 (27.1)	−1.6 (29.1)	−5.0 (23.0)	−9.7 (14.5)	−13.9 (7.0)	−19.4 (−2.9)
Source: Danish Meteorological Institute (1991-2020 temperature)

== Settlement school ==
The settlement school--Atuarfik Qassimiut, Greenlandic for "school of Qassimiut" is part of the Qaqortoq education district. The two-classroom school building was moved to Qassimiut in 1965. The most recent refurbishing and renovation of the school was in the late 1980s.

== Transport and communications ==
The settlement has its own heliport, Qassimiut Heliport, which is operated by Mittarfeqarfiit. All other transportation is by boat only. The settlement has gravel roads, but there are no cars.

Internet and phone communications are provided by Greenland Home Rule.

== Famous people from Qassimiut ==
- Jonathan Motzfeldt – politician (S)

== Population ==
Most towns and settlements in southern Greenland exhibit negative growth patterns over the last two decades, with many settlements rapidly depopulating. Qassimiut has been rapidly losing population over the last two decades. Its population has decreased by more than two thirds relative to the 1990 levels.

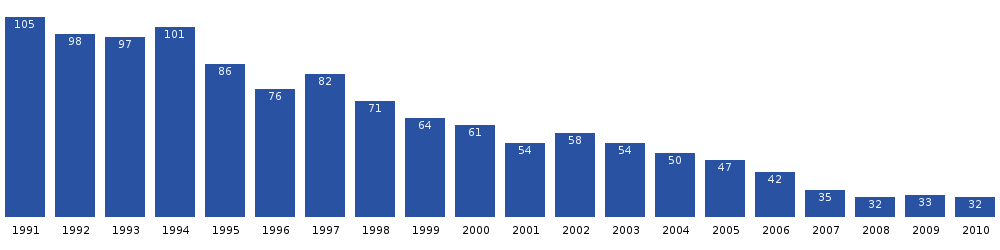
Qassimiut population growth dynamics in the last two decades. Source: Statistics Greenland
