= Ammassivik =

Ammassivik Sletten
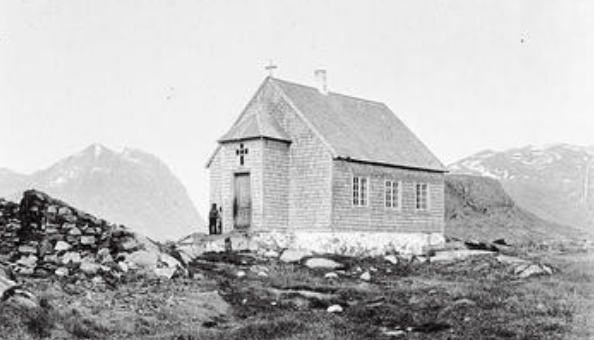
- The church in Ammassivik, 1892

- Location within Greenland
- Coordinates: 60°35′48″N 45°23′10″W
- State: Kingdom of Denmark
- Constituent country: Greenland
- Municipality: Kujalleq

Population (2025)
  - Total: 29
- Time zone: UTC−02:00 (Western Greenland Time)
  - Summer (DST): UTC−01:00 (Western Greenland Summer Time)
- Postal code: 3922 Nanortalik

Ammassivik (old spelling: Angmagssivik) is a settlement in the Kujalleq municipality in southern Greenland. The modern name is the Kalaallisut for "where you catch ammassaat (capelin)". Its population was 74 in 2010. As of 1 January 2024, its population was 32.

The settlement was founded in 1889 as Sletten. In 1899, a school – the Isak Lundip atuarfia – was built in the settlement by Danish missionaries. The school had 6 students in 2005.

In 1922, the settlement became a trading centre.

Until December 31, 2008, the settlement belonged to the Nanortalik municipality. Since January 1, 2009, the settlement has been part of the Kujalleq municipality, when the former municipalities of Qaqortoq, Narsaq, and Nanortalik ceased to exist as administrative entities.

== Transport and communications ==
The settlement has a heliport, connecting it to the nearby Nanortalik and Aappilattoq, and with the rest of the world.

The main transportation is by sea. During winter, dog sled routes are important transport links to the surrounding area.

The settlement is served by a GSM supported ADSL Internet link. Ammassivik is also the postal centre of the surrounding area, being regularly visited by a post ship.

== Geography ==
The settlement is located at approximately 60°35′48″N 45°23′10″W, on the shore of the Alluitsoq Fjord (Danish: Lichtenaufjorden). The sheep farms of Qallimiut and Qorlortorsuaq are nearby, with 15 and 13 inhabitants, respectively. On the opposite side of the fjord are the ruins of the Moravian mission Lichtenau, once Greenland's most populous settlement.

== Population ==
Most towns and settlements in southern Greenland exhibit negative growth patterns over the last two decades, with many settlements rapidly depopulating. The population of Ammassivik more than halved relative to the 1990 levels, and decreased over a quarter relative to the 2000 levels.

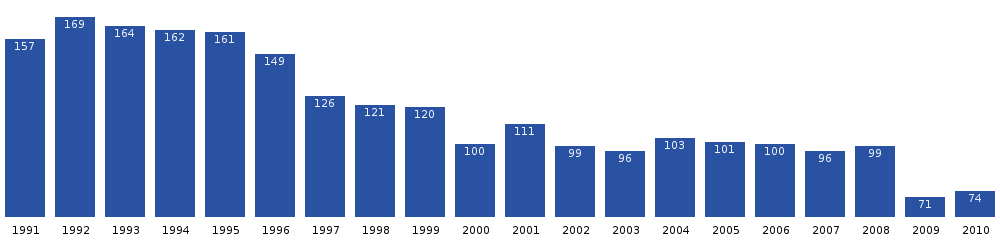
Ammassivik population growth dynamics in the last two decades. Source: Statistics Greenland
