= Telephone numbers in Greenland =

- Location of Greenland
- Country: Greenland
- Continent: North America
- Format: +299 YY XX XX
- Country code: +299
- International access: 00

Telephone numbers in Greenland use the country calling code +299 and six-digit telephone numbers. Calls within Greenland are dialed as YY XX XX, while calls from abroad use +299 YY XX XX; the international call prefix is 00. Mobile numbers use the two-digit prefixes 21–29, 42–49, and 51–59. Landline numbers generally use geographic prefixes beginning with 3 in Nuuk, 6 in southern Greenland, 8 in western Greenland, and 9 in northern and eastern Greenland.

== Calling formats ==
To call in Greenland, the following format is used:

yy xx xx Calls inside Greenland

+299 yy xx xx Calls from outside Greenland

00 International Direct Dialing code

== List of area codes in Greenland ==
Mobile phone numbers are allocated numbers 21 xxxx – 29 xxxx, 42 xxxx – 49 xxxx and 51 xxxx – 59 xxxx. Landline numbers start with 3 (Nuuk), 6 (South Greenland), 8 (West) or 9 (North and East).

LIST OF AREA CODES
Area Code		Area/City	Municipality
3x	31 XX XX	Nuuk	Sermersooq
3x	32 XX XX	Nuuk	Sermersooq
3x	33 XX XX	Nuuk	Sermersooq
3x	34 XX XX	Nuuk	Sermersooq
3x	35 XX XX	Nuuk	Sermersooq
3x	36 XX XX	Nuuk	Sermersooq
3x	37 XX XX	Nuuk	Sermersooq
3x	38 XX XX	Voice over Internet Protocol (VoIP)	
3x	39 XX XX	Voice over Internet Protocol (VoIP)	
6x	61 XX XX	Nanortalik	Kujalleq
6x	64 XX XX	Qaqortoq	Kujalleq
6x	66 XX XX	Narsaq	Kujalleq
6x	68 XX XX	Paamiut	Sermersooq (south-west)
6x	69 1X XX	Ivittuut (Kangilinnguit)	Sermersooq (south-west)
8x	81 XX XX	Maniitsoq	Qeqqata
8x	84 XX XX	Kangerlussuaq	Qeqqata
8x	85 XX XX	Sisimiut	Qeqqata
8x	86 XX XX	Sisimiut	Qeqqata
8x	87 XX XX	Kangaatsiaq	Qeqertalik
8x	89 XX XX	Aasiaat	Qeqertalik
9x	91 XX XX	Qasigiannguit	Qeqertalik
9x	92 XX XX	Qeqertarsuaq (Disko Island)	Qeqertalik
9x	94 XX XX	Ilulissat	Avannaata
9x	95 XX XX	Uummannaq	Avannaata
9x	96 XX XX	Upernavik	Avannaata
9x	97 XX XX	Qaanaaq	Avannaata
9x	98 XX XX	Tasiilaq	Sermersooq (east)
9x	99 XX XX	Ittoqqortoormiit	Sermersooq (east)
