= Aappilattoq, Kujalleq =

Place in Greenland, Kingdom of Denmark

Aappilattoq Rødførde
- Village
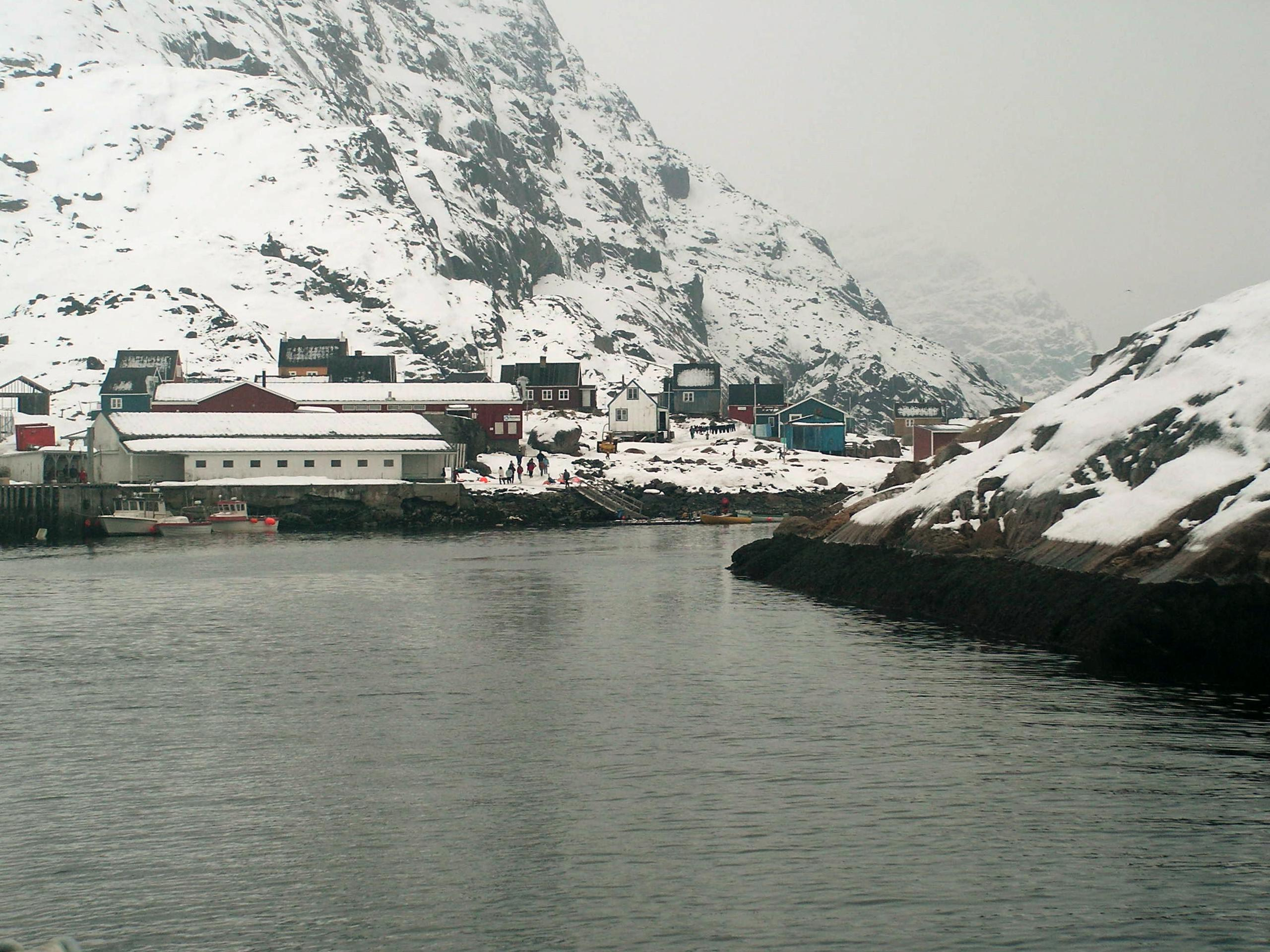

- Location in Greenland
- Coordinates: 60°09′01″N 44°17′06″W
- State: Kingdom of Denmark
- Constituent country: Greenland
- Municipality: Kujalleq

Government
  - Mayor: Hans Levisen
- Elevation: 4.6 m (15 ft)

Population (2025)
  - Total: 86
- Time zone: UTC−02:00 (WGT)
  - Summer (DST): UTC−01:00 (WGST)
- Postal code: 3922 Nanortalik

Aappilattoq or Rødførde is a village in the Kujalleq municipality in southern Greenland. The name means "red", after the red mountain rising above the settlement in the Greenlandic language. The settlement had 86 inhabitants in 2025. The area of Aappilattoq has been inhabited since the 19th century, but the present-day village was founded in 1922.

The main occupations and sources of income are hunting and fishing.

== Infrastructure and governance ==
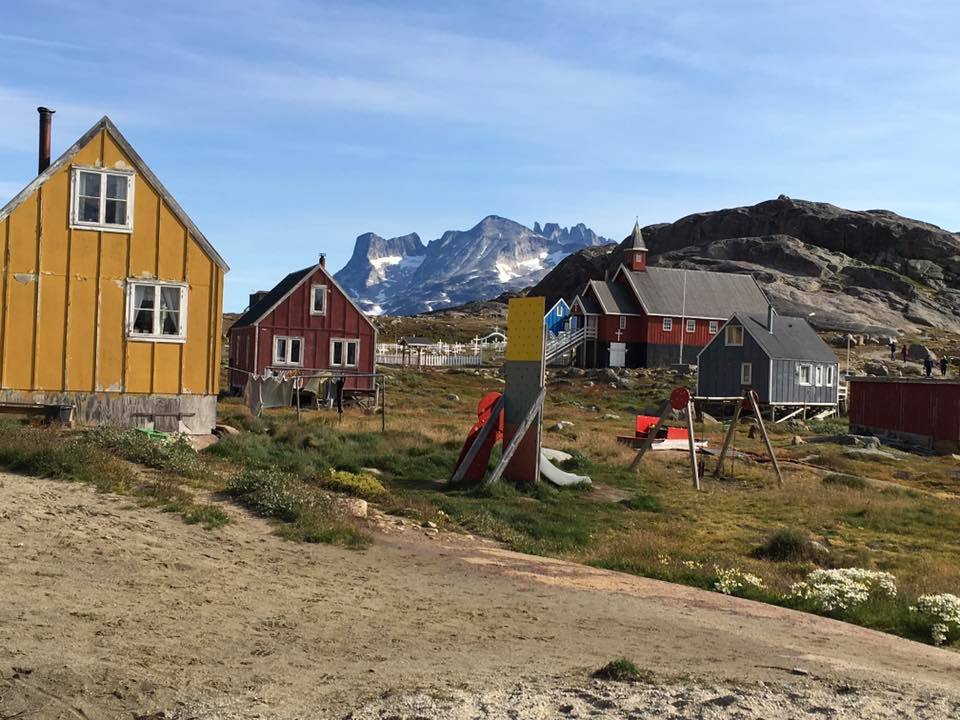
View from the shop towards the church, summer 2017

The median age of the settlement is 31.4 years, the lowest in the municipality. The main settlement service house is maintained and operated by the Kujalleq municipality. There is also a general store operated by KNI, and a general repairs workshop. The local fire station is operated by Nanortalik fire department.

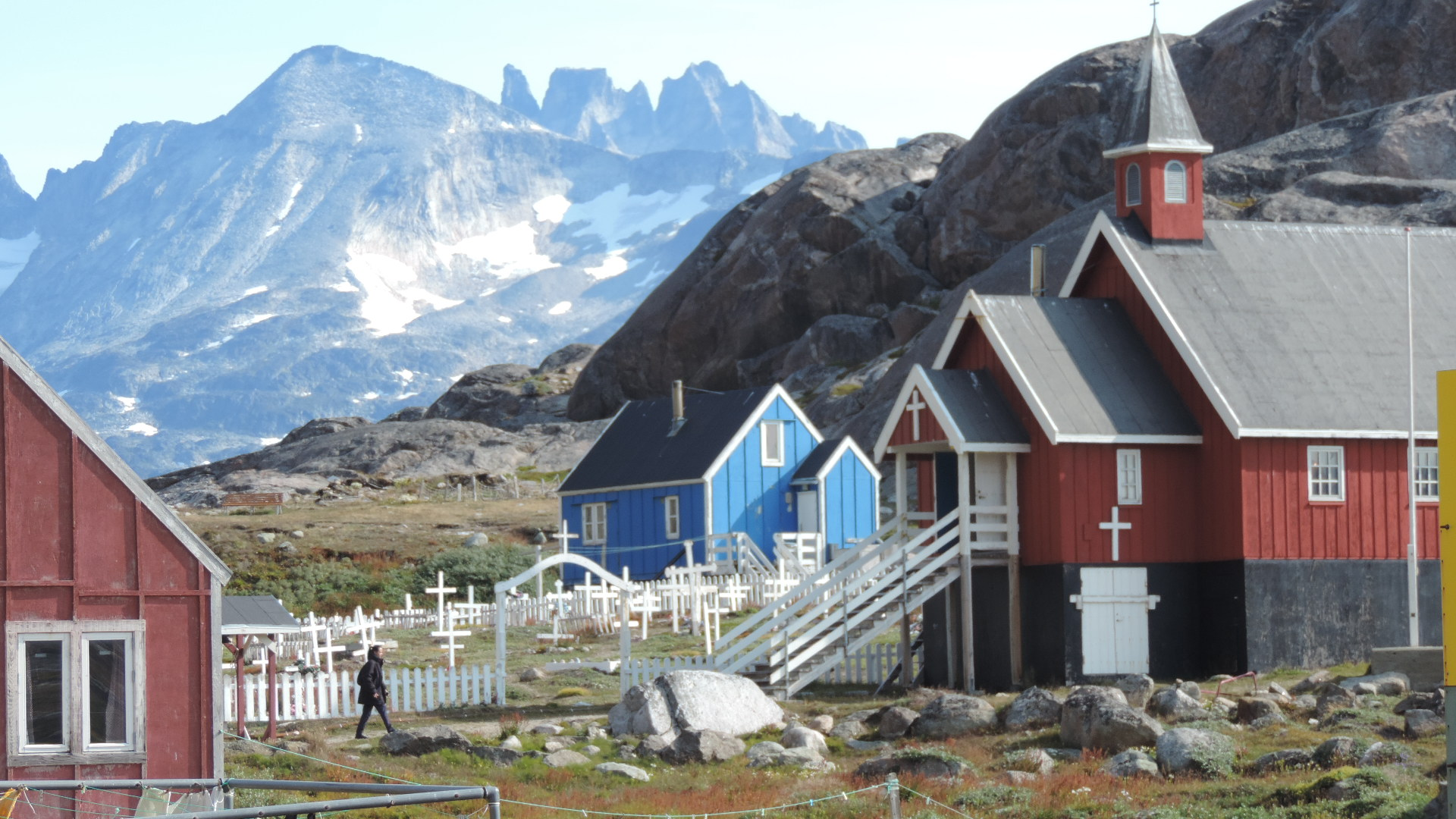
Church and cemetery, 2017

The settlement also houses a school, Jaajap atuarfia, which had 22 pupils in 2006. Appilattoq also has its own church.

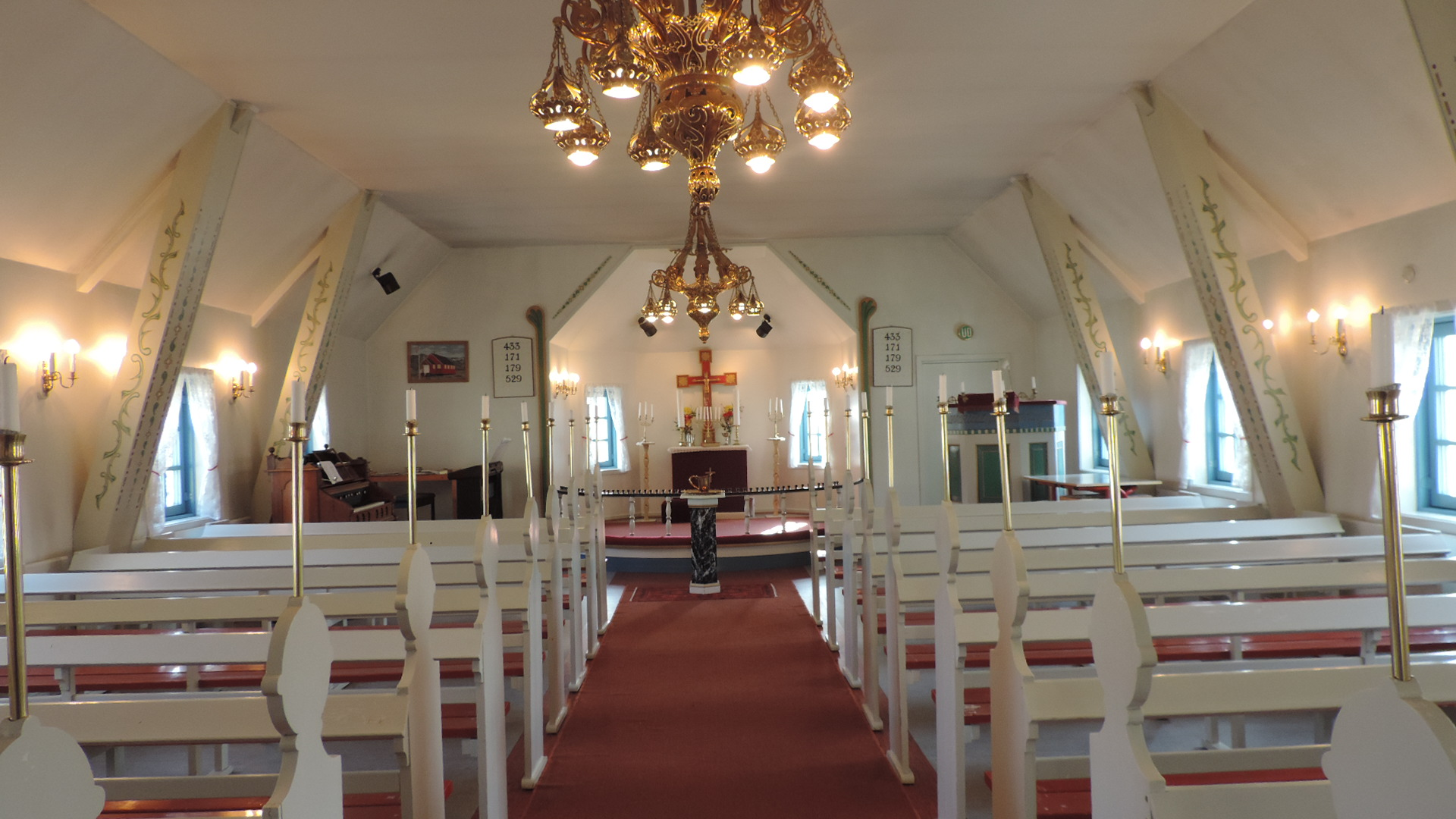
Church interior, 2017

Together with the settlements Narsarmijit and Tasiusaq the village is governed by a joint council. The head of the council is Hans Levisen.

Until 31 December 2008, the settlement belonged to the Nanortalik municipality. Since 1 January 2009, the settlement has been part of the Kujalleq municipality, when the former municipalities of Qaqortoq, Narsaq, and Nanortalik ceased to exist as administrative entities.

== Transportation ==
The settlement has a heliport operated by Air Greenland. The village is served as part of government contract, with mostly cargo helicopter flights. The main transportation routes are via air or sea. The village is practically inaccessible via land due to its remote location and the surrounding mountain region. Every summer a few large or very large cruise ships go through Prince Christian Sound and pass Aappilattoq. The largest cruise ship believed to have passed by is Voyager of the Seas in September 2022.

== Geography ==
Aappilattoq is located east of Nanortalik, roughly 50 km north of Cape Farewell, the southern cape of Greenland. including Prince Christian Sound, a 100 km long, steep and 1/2-2 km wide fjord.

=== Mountains ===
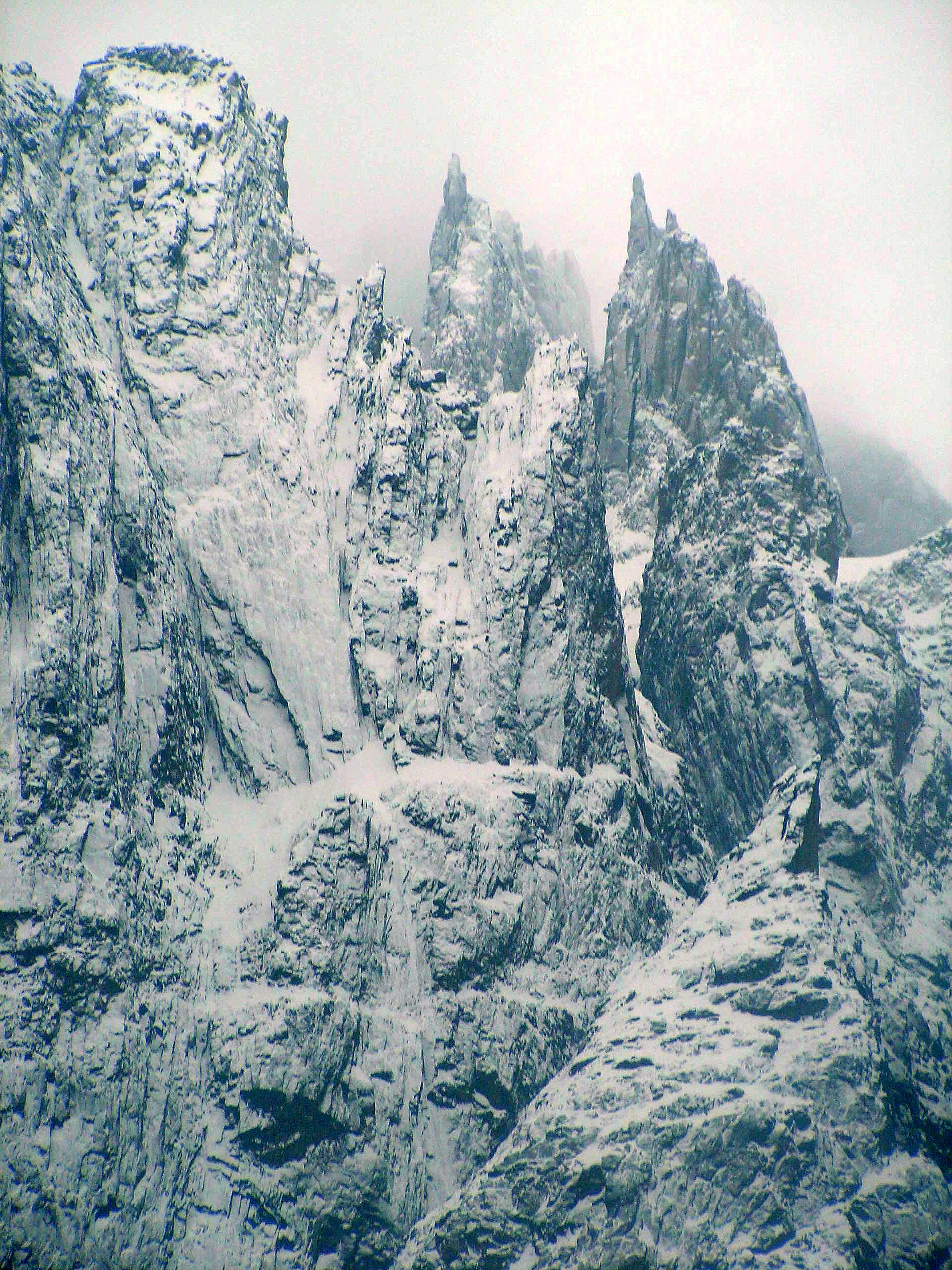
Unlike most other summits in the area, these almost 2,000 m peaks near Aappilattoq are unglaciated.

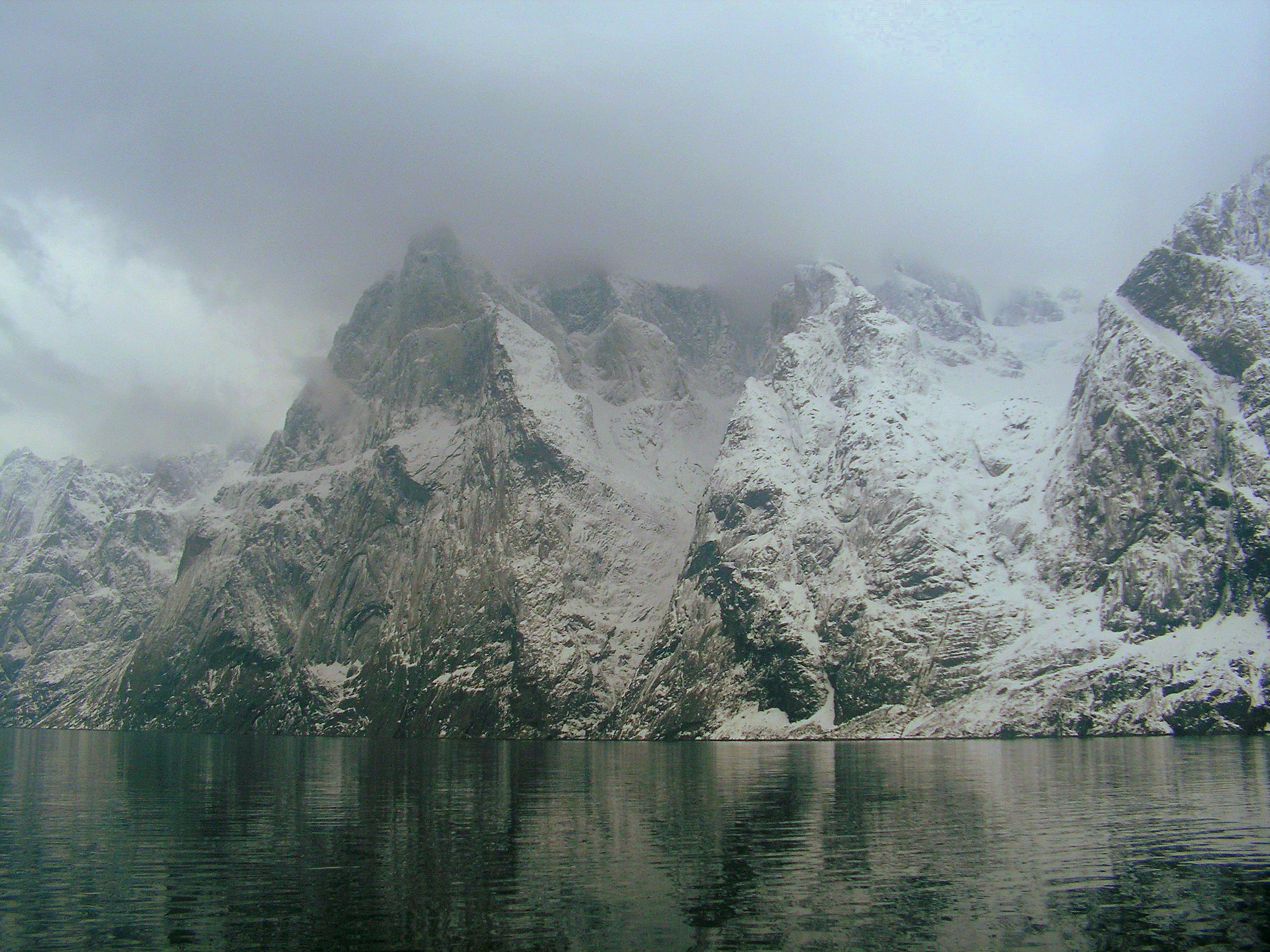
Steep rock walls dominate the landscape near Aappilattoq.

=== Climate ===
Aappilatoq has a wet tundra climate (ET) with heavy precipitation and cold to very cold weather year-round.

Climate data for Aappilatoq
Month	Jan	Feb	Mar	Apr	May	Jun	Jul	Aug	Sep	Oct	Nov	Dec	Year
Mean daily maximum °C (°F)	−2.9 (26.8)	−2.4 (27.7)	−1.9 (28.6)	1.6 (34.9)	5.2 (41.4)	8.5 (47.3)	10.7 (51.3)	10.3 (50.5)	7.1 (44.8)	2.8 (37.0)	−0.1 (31.8)	−2.3 (27.9)	3.1 (37.5)
Daily mean °C (°F)	−5.8 (21.6)	−5.4 (22.3)	−4.8 (23.4)	−1.4 (29.5)	2.3 (36.1)	5.0 (41.0)	7.1 (44.8)	6.8 (44.2)	4.2 (39.6)	0.4 (32.7)	−2.6 (27.3)	−5.0 (23.0)	0.1 (32.1)
Mean daily minimum °C (°F)	−8.6 (16.5)	−8.3 (17.1)	−7.7 (18.1)	−4.3 (24.3)	−0.6 (30.9)	1.6 (34.9)	3.6 (38.5)	3.4 (38.1)	1.3 (34.3)	−1.9 (28.6)	−5.1 (22.8)	−7.6 (18.3)	−2.8 (26.9)
Average rainfall mm (inches)	151 (5.9)	142 (5.6)	124 (4.9)	139 (5.5)	114 (4.5)	114 (4.5)	111 (4.4)	133 (5.2)	168 (6.6)	143 (5.6)	158 (6.2)	157 (6.2)	1,654 (65.1)
Source: Climate-Data.org

== Population ==
Most towns and settlements in southern Greenland exhibit negative growth patterns over the last two decades, with many settlements rapidly depopulating. The population of Aappilattoq has decreased by more than a third relative to the 1990 levels, and by over 20 percent relative to the 2000 levels.

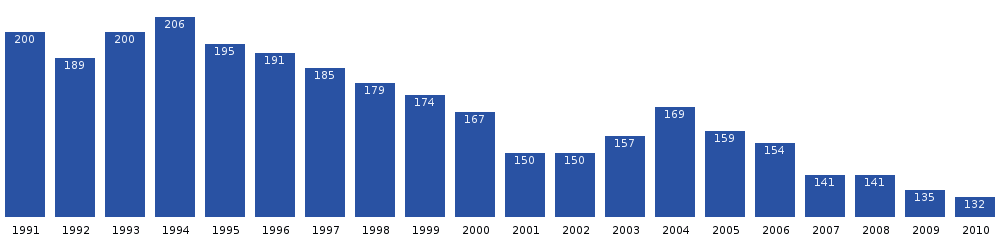
Aappilattoq population growth dynamics in the last two decades. Source: Statistics Greenland
