= Alluitsup Paa =

Town in Greenland

Alluitsup Paa Sydprøven
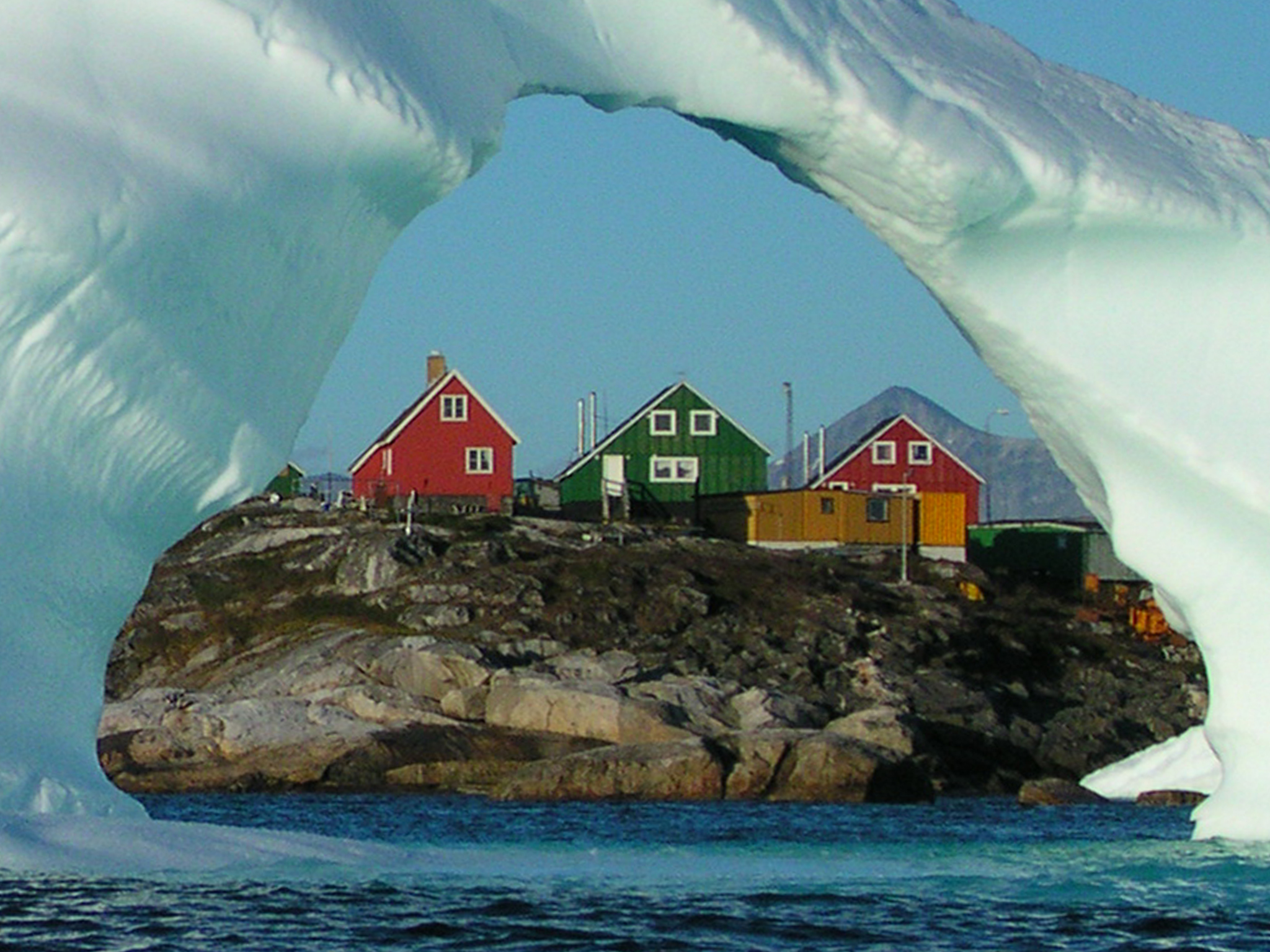
- Alluitsup Paa

- Location within Greenland
- Coordinates: 60°27′45″N 45°34′10″W
- State: Kingdom of Denmark
- Constituent country: Greenland
- Municipality: Kujalleq
- Founded: 1830

Government
  - Mayor: Bendt Kleist

Population (2025)
  - Total: 136
- Time zone: UTC−02:00 (Western Greenland Time)
  - Summer (DST): UTC−01:00 (Western Greenland Summer Time)
- Postal code: 3919
- Website: alluitsuppaa.net (Greenlandic)

Alluitsup Paa (old spelling prior to the orthography reform in 1973: Agdluitsup pâ) is a village in the Kujalleq municipality in southern Greenland. Alluitsup Paa had 136 residents in 2025. Presently, the community's religious activities take place in Qaqortoq.

== History ==
The Alluitsup Paa area was the southern point of a district known to the Norse as Vatnahverfi during the 10th–15th centuries. There are seven known sites from the Norse period within a few kilometres of the modern village, although the Norse generally preferred to settle further inland.

The settlement was founded as the trading station Sydprøven ("South Prøven") in 1830, to distinguish it from Nordprøven ("North Prøven", modern-day Narsaq), which had been established earlier the same year. The original Inuit Greenlandic name means "the mouth of the fjord of Alluitsoq", further giving emphasis to the now-abandoned village of Alluitsoq, in Inuit Greenlandic meaning "the place of no seal breathing wholes in the ice".

Until 31 December 2008, the town was the second-largest population center of Nanortalik Municipality in the Kitaa amt. On 1 January 2009, Alluitsup Paa became part of the Kujalleq municipality when the Kitaa amt, as well as the municipalities of Narsaq, Qaqortoq, and Nanortalik, ceased to exist as administrative entities.

Before the municipal reform of 2009, Alluitsup Paa was Greenland's largest settlement without municipal status.

== Uunartoq geothermal springs ==
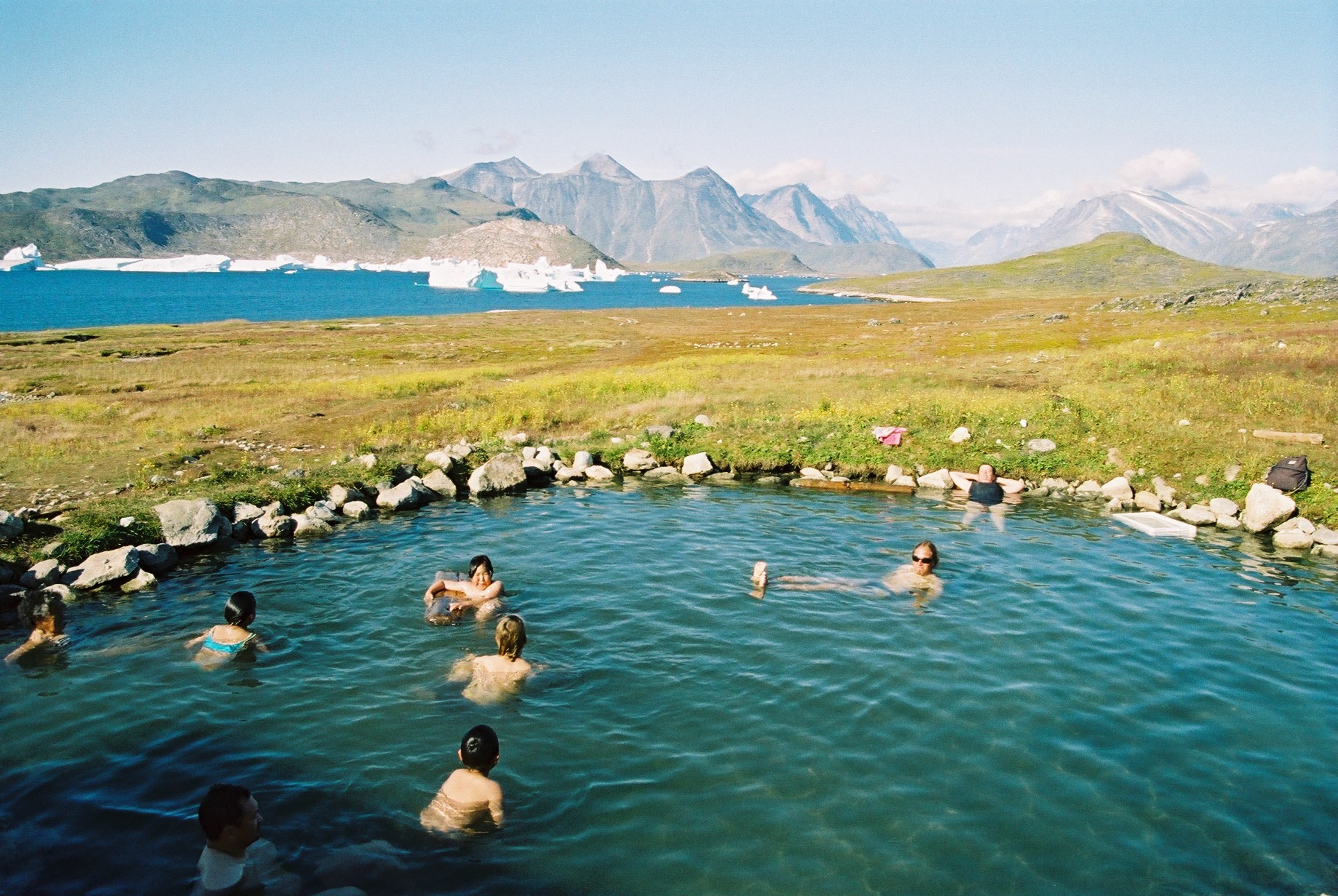
Hot springs

On the Uunartoq Island, in the vicinity of the town, there are geothermal springs with temperatures between 34 and 38 degrees Celsius. There are drifting icebergs and many whales offshore.

Qerrortuut, Inuit ruins of previous settlements from late 18th and early 19th centuries, can be found to the west of the village, on the same island. There are also ruins of a nunnery built near the hot springs after Greenland was first introduced to Christianity around 1000, and is the site where the Uunartoq Disc was discovered.

== Infrastructure and economy ==
=== Infrastructure ===
The school-aged children attend the local Atuarfik Anders Nielsen school. The school has 50 pupils in 11 grades. The school also operates a small sports hall, and it has its own dentist. Due to the relatively large size of the school, it has its own headmaster.

The trading conglomerate KNI operates a Pilersuisoq supermarket in the village, and there are two smaller kiosks for purchase of smaller items. There is also a post office and an Internet-café. The village also houses a first-aid clinic and a dentist. The dentist operates in conjunction with the local school.

=== Economy ===
The fishing industry is the major employer, employing the majority of the workforce. Shrimp, Greenlandic halibut, and cod is the main catch, and a small fishing factory focusing on shrimp production officiates in the village.

There is also a small but significant tourism industry. Two hotels operate in the village: Qaannivik Hotel and, since 2006, Seaside Whale Hotel. The hotels offer tourists trips to the nearby sights, the Uunarteq warm springs, the abandoned Amitsoq copper and graphite mine, the nearly abandoned village of Alluitsoq (Lichtenau), the nearby quaint settlements of Akuliaruseq and Qarsorsat, and the village of Ammassivik (Sletten). The hiking route along the Vatnahverfi peninsula is among the most popular tourist destinations in Greenland.

Operated by Greenland Home Rule Government, the local Integrated Office in the district employs two people.

== Transport ==
Alluitsup Paa Heliport (IATA: LLU) operates year-round, linking Alluitsup Paa with Narsarsuaq Airport (IATA: UAK, ICAO: BGBW) and indirectly with the rest of Greenland and Europe. Air Greenland operates four flight to Nanortalik and Qaqortoq per week.

The port authority for Alluitsup Paa is Royal Arctic Line, located in Nuuk.

As is true of all populated places in Greenland, Alluitsup Paa is not connected to any other place via roads. Fairly well-trodden hiking trails lead northwards from the town, but for any motorized transportation, terrain vehicles are needed. During winter, dog sled routes are vital transport links to the surrounding area. Alluitsup Paa is connected to mainland Greenland via a small land bridge, making motorized transportation possible.

== Population ==
Most towns and settlements in southern Greenland exhibit negative growth patterns over the last two decades, with many settlements rapidly depopulating. Alluitsup Paa has been losing population faster than most of its neighbors; its population decreased over 40% between 2000 and 2010.

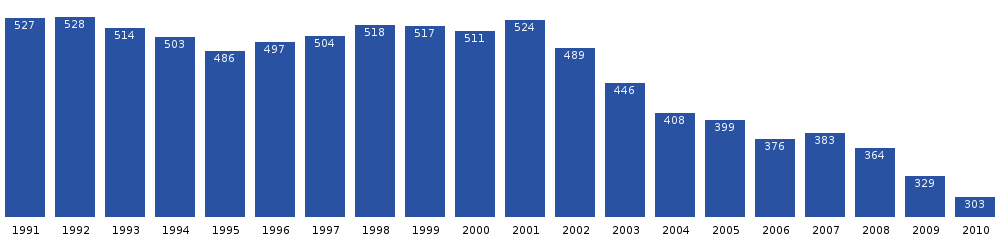
Alluitsup Paa population growth dynamics in the last two decades. Source: Statistics Greenland

== Twin Town ==
Alluitsup Paa is twinned with:

- Rudersdal Municipality, Denmark
