= Kujalleq =

Municipality of Greenland

Kujalleq Syden (Danish)
- Municipality
- Kujalleq Municipality: Kujalleq Kommunia (Greenlandic); Kujalleq Kommune (Danish)
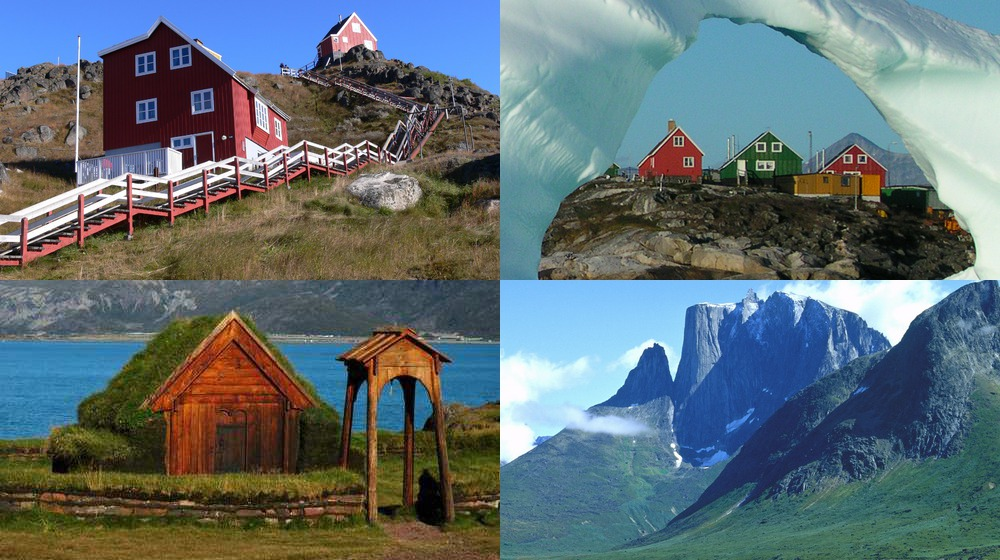
- Clockwise from top left: Qaqortoq, Alluitsup Paa, Ulamertorsuaq, Qassiarsuk

- Flag Coat of arms

- Location of Kujalleq within Greenland
- Coordinates (Kujalleq Commune): 61°00′N 45°00′W
- Sovereign state: Kingdom of Denmark
- Autonomous territory: Greenland
- Established: 1 January 2009
- Municipal center: Qaqortoq

Government
  - Mayor: Malene Vahl Rasmussen (Demokraatit)

Area
  - Total: 32,000 km^{2} (12,000 sq mi)

Population (1 January 2025)
  - Total: 6,110
  - Density: 0.197/km^{2} (0.51/sq mi)
- Time zone: UTC-02, UTC-01
- Calling code: +299
- ISO 3166 code: GL-KU
- Website: kujalleq.gl

Kujalleq (Greenlandic: Greenlandic pronunciation: [kujaɬːɜq̚], Danish: Syden, lit. 'The South') is a municipality on the southern tip of Greenland, operational from 1 January 2009. The administrative center of the municipality is in Qaqortoq (formerly called Julianehåb).

== Creation ==
The municipality consists of the former municipalities of southern Greenland, each named after the biggest settlement:

- Nanortalik Municipality
- Narsaq Municipality
- Qaqortoq Municipality

In addition to the area of these municipalities, uninhabited parts of the former municipalities of Paamiut and Ammassalik were added to the new administrative entity. In the case of Paamiut Municipality, it was exclusively a part of the ice sheet including a few nunataks. In the case of Ammassalik Municipality, it included the coast from the fjord Kangerlussuatsiaq (in Danish Lindenow Fjord) on the old border with Nanortalik Municipality in the south to north of Timmiarmiut.

== Coat of arms ==
The coat of arms of the municipality depicts a ram's head, symbolising the sheep farming in the area, which has become one of the most important parts of Kujalleq's economy. The uppermost part of the shield contains the sun of the Greenlandic flag. Likewise the choice of colours matches those of the country's flag. The coat of arms was adopted in August 2008.

== Geography ==
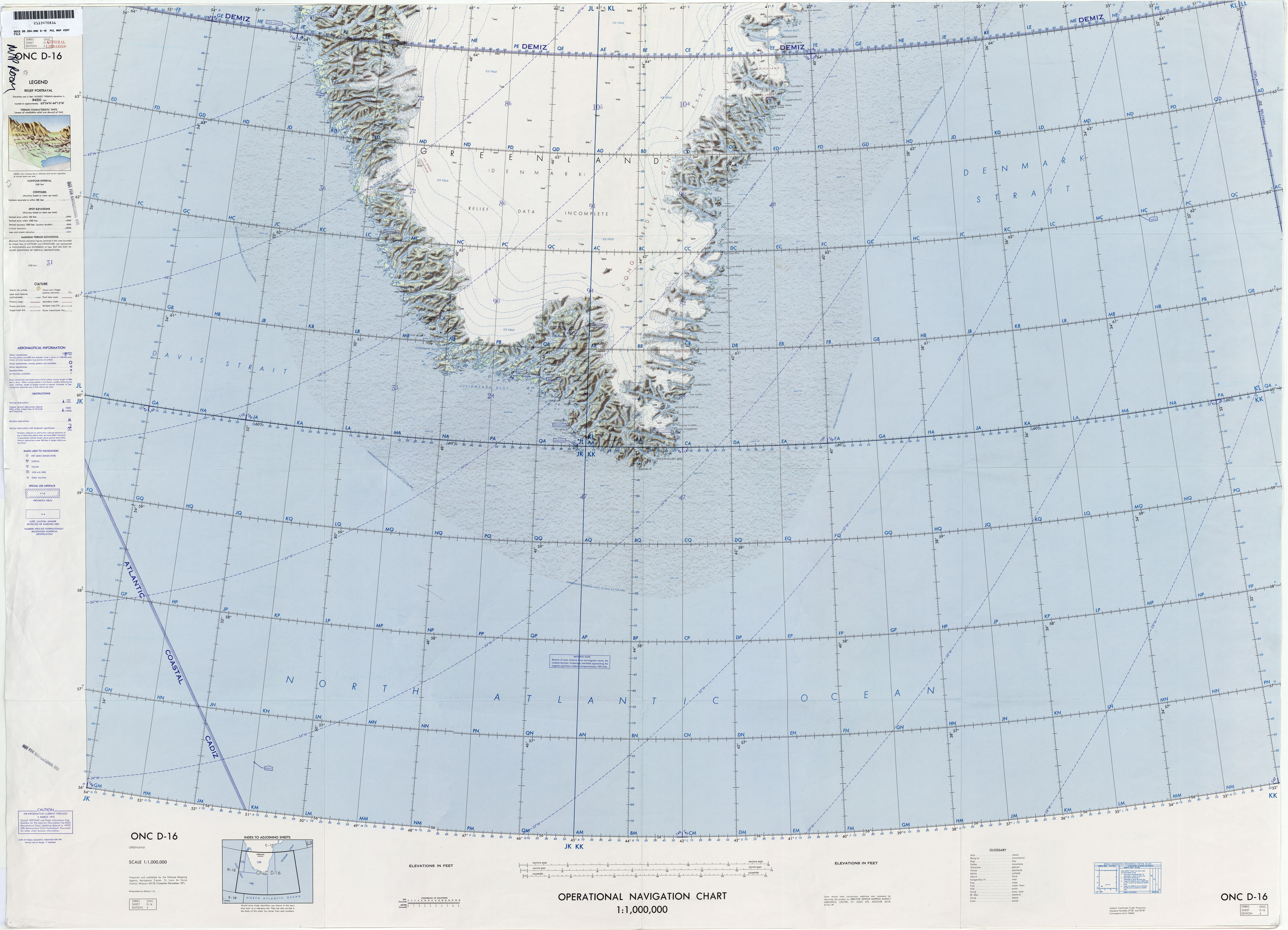
Map including Kujalleq area

At 32,000 km^{2} (12,355.3 mi^{2}) of area Kujalleq is the smallest municipality in Greenland by area. Straddling the southernmost end of the island of Greenland, it is bordered by only one municipality, Sermersooq, in the north. The waters of the western coast are that of Labrador Sea, which meet the open North Atlantic at Uummannarsuaq, the southern cape. The border on the western coast runs alongside Alanngorsuaq Fjord and on the eastern coast up to Anorituup Kangerlua (Anoritoq) Fjord.

The entire municipal area is highly mountainous, with numerous fjords carving deeply into the land. All settlements are located on the western coast, or in fjords ending there.

== Politics ==
Kujalleq's municipal council consists of 15 members, elected every four years.

=== Municipal council ===
Election	Party				Total seats	Turnout	Elected mayor
Election	A	D	IA	S	Total seats	Turnout	Elected mayor
2008	1	1	5	8	15	72.9%	
2013	1		5	9	15	66.9%	Jørgen Wæver Johansen (S)
2017	1		5	9	15	68.6%	Kiista P. Isaksen (S)
2021	1		8	6	15	70.1%	Stine Egede (IA)
2025		7	3	5	15	61.2%	Malene Vahl Rasmussen (D) (D-S coalition)
Data from Valg.gl

== Administrative divisions ==
=== Nanortalik area ===
- Nanortalik (Nennortalik)
- Aappilattoq
- Alluitsup Paa (Sydprøven)
- Ammassivik (Sletten)
- Narsaq Kujalleq (Narsaq Kujalleq, Frederiksdal)
- Tasiusaq
- Qorlortorsuaq

=== Narsaq area ===
- Narsaq (Nordprøven)
- Igaliku (Igaliko)
- Narsarsuaq
- Qassiarsuk

=== Qaqortoq area ===
- Qaqortoq (Julianehåb)
- Eqalugaarsuit
- Qassimiut
- Saarloq
- Upernaviarsuk

== Transportation ==
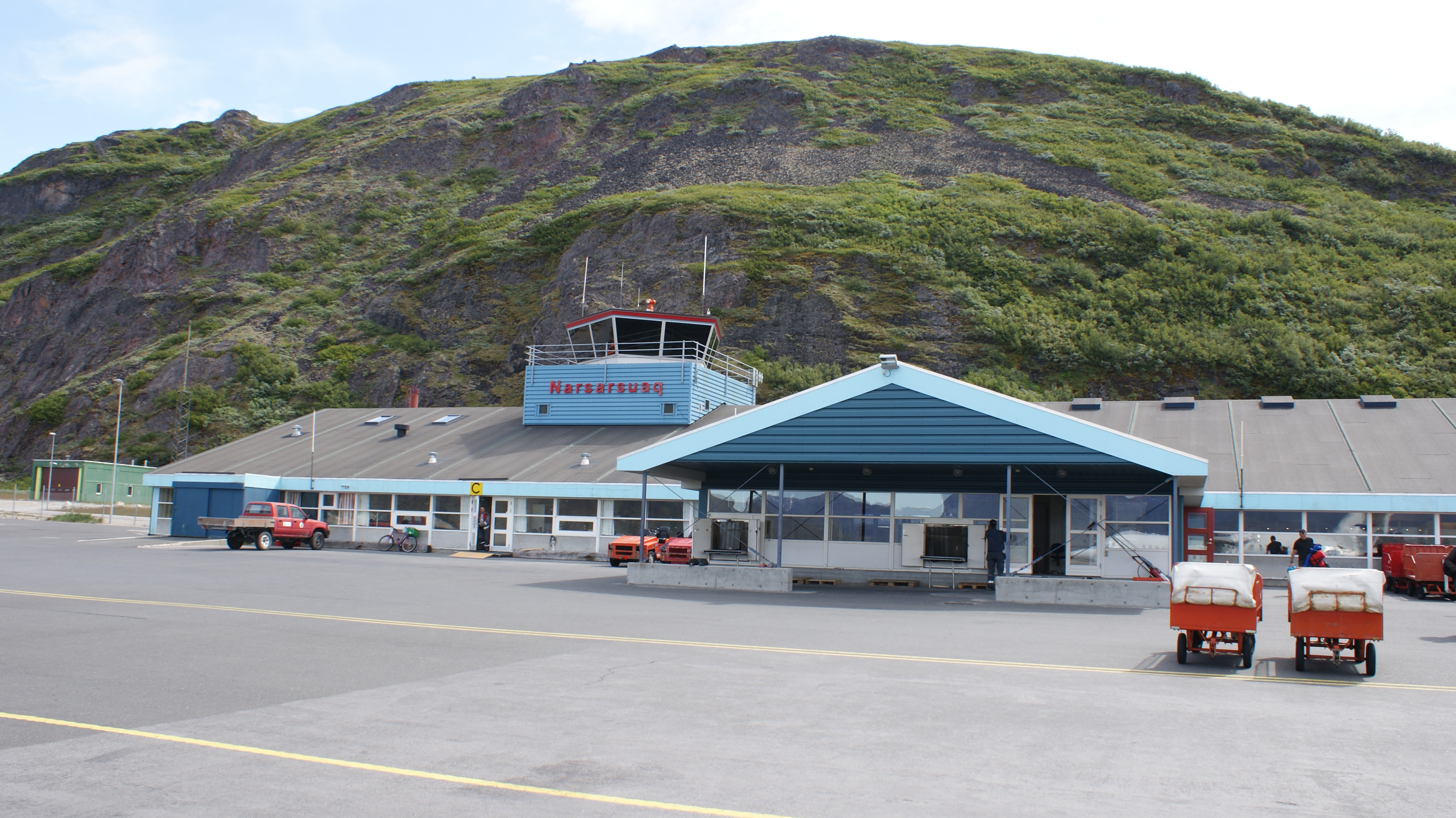
The Narsarsuaq Airport.

The only airport is Narsarsuaq Airport. Helicopters and boats go to other settlements.

== International relations ==
=== Twin Town — Sister City ===
Kujalleq is twinned with:

- Aarhus in Denmark

== See also ==
- KANUKOKA, the Greenlandic municipal association
- Eastern Settlement, the former Norse settlement in the area
- Lichtenfels & Lichtenau, former Moravian missions in the area
- Narsaq massacre
