= 2013 Greenlandic local elections =

- 2 April 2013
- 4 municipal councils
Party	Leader	Vote %	Seats	+/–
Siumut	Aleqa Hammond	48.14	38	+8
Inuit Ataqatigiit	Kuupik Kleist	29.75	20	−1
Atassut	Gerhardt Petersen	13.03	9	−1
Democrats	Jens B. Frederiksen	6.46	2	−6
Independents	–	0.17	1	0
This lists parties that won seats. See the complete results below.

The 2013 Greenlandic local elections were held on 2 April 2013.

== Results ==
Party	Votes	%	Seats	+/–
Siumut	11,336	48.14	38	+8
Inuit Ataqatigiit	7,006	29.75	20	–1
Atassut	3,069	13.03	9	–1
Democrats	1,521	6.46	2	–6
Inuit Party	309	1.31	0	–8
Association of Candidates	268	1.14	0	–2
Independents	39	0.17	1	+1
Total	23,548	100.00	70	–2
Valid votes	23,548	98.80		
Invalid/blank votes	286	1.20		
Total votes	23,834	100.00		
Registered voters/turnout	40,909	58.26		
