= Nanortalik =

Town in Greenland

- Town
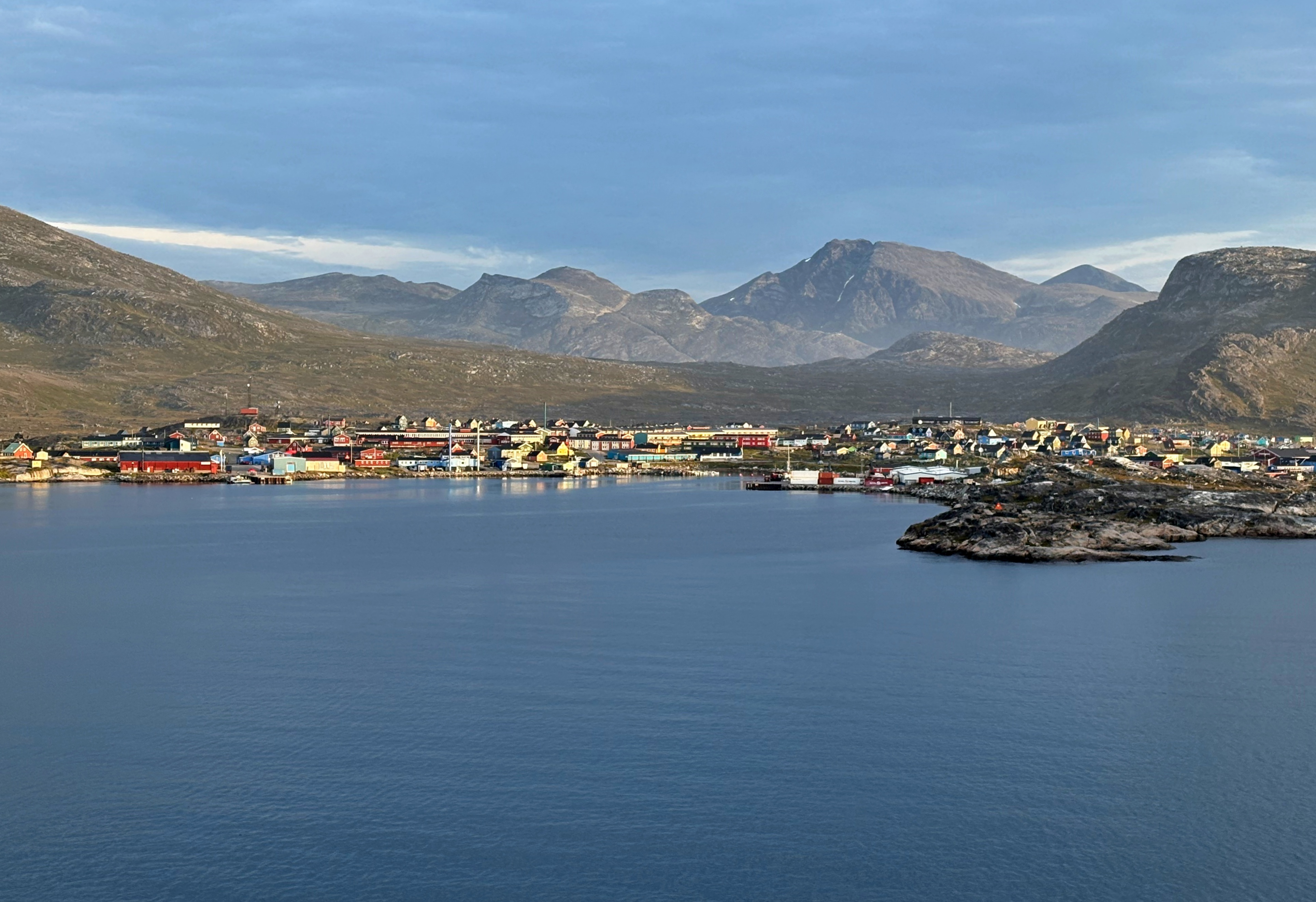
- View of the town

- Location in Greenland
- Coordinates: 60°08′31″N 45°14′36″W
- Sovereign state: Kingdom of Denmark
- Constituent country: Greenland
- Municipality: Kujalleq
- Elevation: 13 m (43 ft)

Population (2024)
  - Total: 1,072
- Time zone: UTC−02:00 (WGT)
  - Summer (DST): UTC−01:00 (WGST)
- Postal code: 3922
- Website: nanortalik.gl

Nanortalik (Greenlandic pronunciation: [nɑnoʁtɑlik̚]), formerly Nennortalik, is a town in Nanortalik Island, Kujalleq municipality, southern Greenland. With 1,072 inhabitants as of 2024, it is the eleventh-largest town in the country. The name Nanortalik means "Place of Polar Bears" or "Place Where the Polar Bears Go" (from nanoq). It is the southernmost town in Greenland with a population of over 1,000.

== History ==
Because of its location, this area was one of the first parts of Greenland settled by the Norse and one of the last settled by the Inuit. The town was founded in 1770 as Nennortalik. In 1797, a permanent trading depot was set up in Nanortalik by traders from Julianehåb. Due to poor harbour facilities, the town was moved three kilometers northward in 1830, where it remains today. Of the old town, only some scattered ruins remain.

== Geography ==
Nanortalik is located on a small island (also named Nanortalik) on the shores of the Labrador Sea, roughly 100 km north of Cape Farewell, the southern tip of Greenland. The headland nearby is known as Cape Egede.

The surrounding district extends from the island of Qeqertarsuaq near Alluitsup Paa down to Cape Farewell and the 60 km long Lindenow Fjord on the east coast. The district covers a total of 15,000 sq. kilometers (5,800 sq. miles).

Nearby settlements are Narsarmijit, Alluitsup Paa (Sydprøven), Tasiusaq, Aappilattoq, Ammassivik as well as the following settlements with no more than 20 inhabitants each: Saputit, Nalasut, Nuugaarsuk, Akuliaruseq, Qallimiut, Qorlortorsuaq, Alluitsoq, and the weather station Ikerasassuaq.

=== Nanortalik Island ===
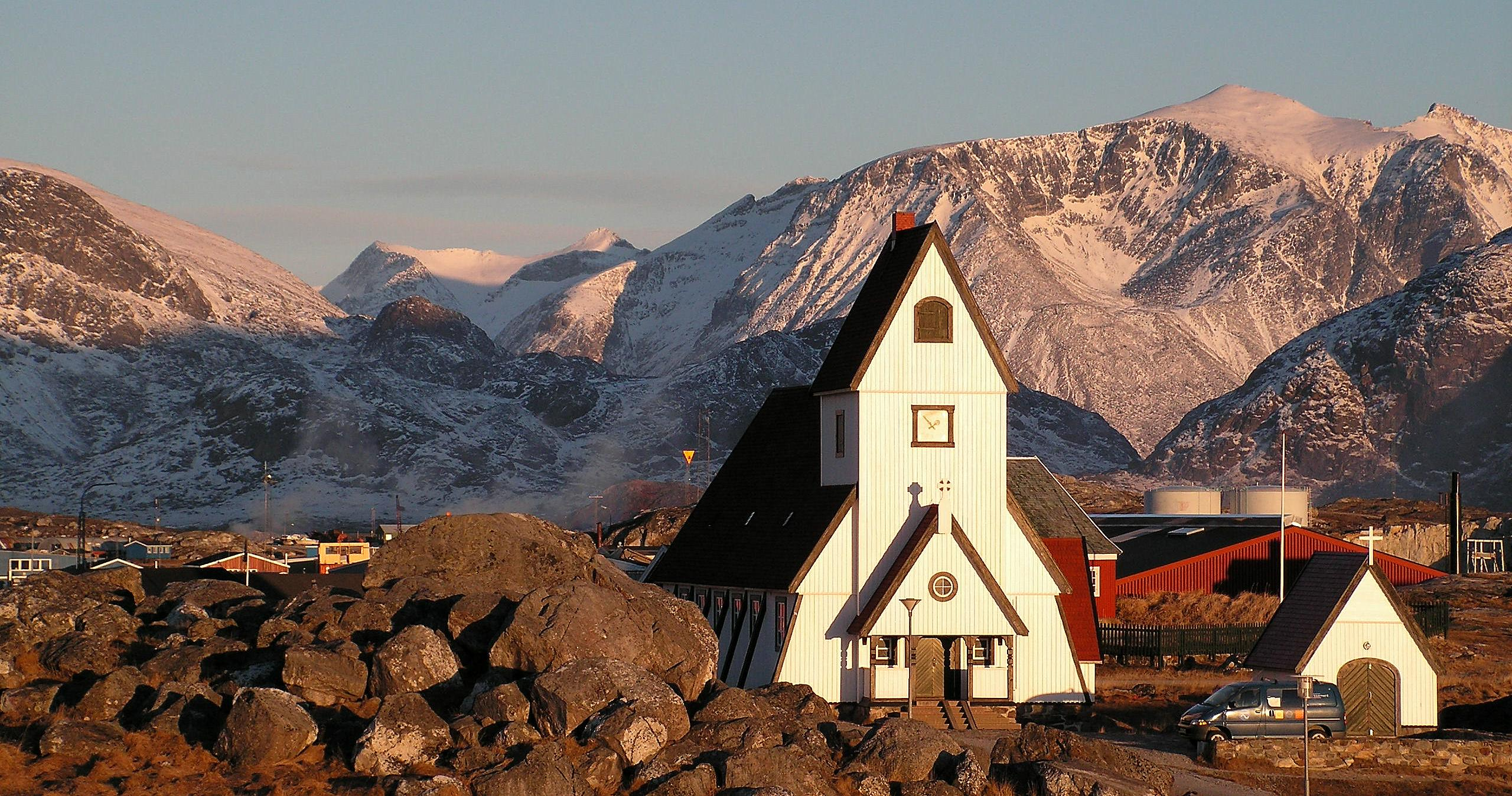
The church of Nanortalik

Nanortalik Island is located near the mouth of the 70 km long Tasermiut Fjord. The island measures about 10 km across and features two minor mountains: Quaqqarsuasik (Danish: Storfjeldet, lit. 'Big Mountain'; 559m) and Quassik (Danish: Ravnefjeldet, lit. 'Raven Mountain'; 308m).

=== Mountaineering ===
There are high mountain peaks and vertical walls in nearby Tasermiut Fjord. Ketil Mountain (1500m) and Ulamertorsuaq are commonly climbed. Ravnefjeldet is also nearby. Torssukatak Fjord, with the huge Thumbnail sea cliffs, and Pamiagdluk Island, are also within reach by chartered boat.

== Climate ==
Nanortalik has a tundra climate (Köppen climate classification ET) with heavy oceanic and polar influences, which creates moderately high precipitation rates, and low temperature differences between seasons respectively. Winters in Nanortalik are very mild compared to the rest of Greenland, with average January temperature being -4 °C. However, the summers are rather cold for this latitude, with an average July temperature 8 °C (in contrast with Helsinki, which is also in a similar latitude, but experiences warmer summers of around 17 °C)

Climate data for Nanortalik
Month	Jan	Feb	Mar	Apr	May	Jun	Jul	Aug	Sep	Oct	Nov	Dec	Year
Record high °C (°F)	11 (52)	11 (52)	8 (46)	15 (59)	16 (61)	20 (68)	17 (63)	19 (66)	16 (61)	14 (57)	13 (55)	12 (54)	20 (68)
Mean daily maximum °C (°F)	−1.3 (29.7)	−0.7 (30.7)	0.0 (32.0)	3.6 (38.5)	7.5 (45.5)	10.4 (50.7)	12.4 (54.3)	12.1 (53.8)	9.0 (48.2)	4.6 (40.3)	1.5 (34.7)	−0.7 (30.7)	4.9 (40.8)
Daily mean °C (°F)	−4.7 (23.5)	−4.1 (24.6)	−3.4 (25.9)	0.2 (32.4)	4.0 (39.2)	6.6 (43.9)	8.6 (47.5)	8.4 (47.1)	5.8 (42.4)	1.8 (35.2)	−1.4 (29.5)	−3.9 (25.0)	1.5 (34.7)
Mean daily minimum °C (°F)	−8.0 (17.6)	−7.5 (18.5)	−6.8 (19.8)	−3.1 (26.4)	0.6 (33.1)	2.8 (37.0)	4.8 (40.6)	4.8 (40.6)	2.8 (37.0)	−1.0 (30.2)	−4.3 (24.3)	−7.0 (19.4)	−1.8 (28.7)
Record low °C (°F)	−15 (5)	−16 (3)	−16 (3)	−13 (9)	−6 (21)	−2 (28)	0 (32)	−1 (30)	−3 (27)	−6 (21)	−10 (14)	−13 (9)	−16 (3)
Average precipitation mm (inches)	120 (4.7)	99 (3.9)	76 (3.0)	74 (2.9)	67 (2.6)	64 (2.5)	67 (2.6)	84 (3.3)	103 (4.1)	89 (3.5)	130 (5.1)	116 (4.6)	1,089 (42.8)
Average relative humidity (%)	75	76	74	72	72	73	76	78	76	75	74	75	75
Source 1: Weatherbase
Source 2: Climate Data

== Economy ==
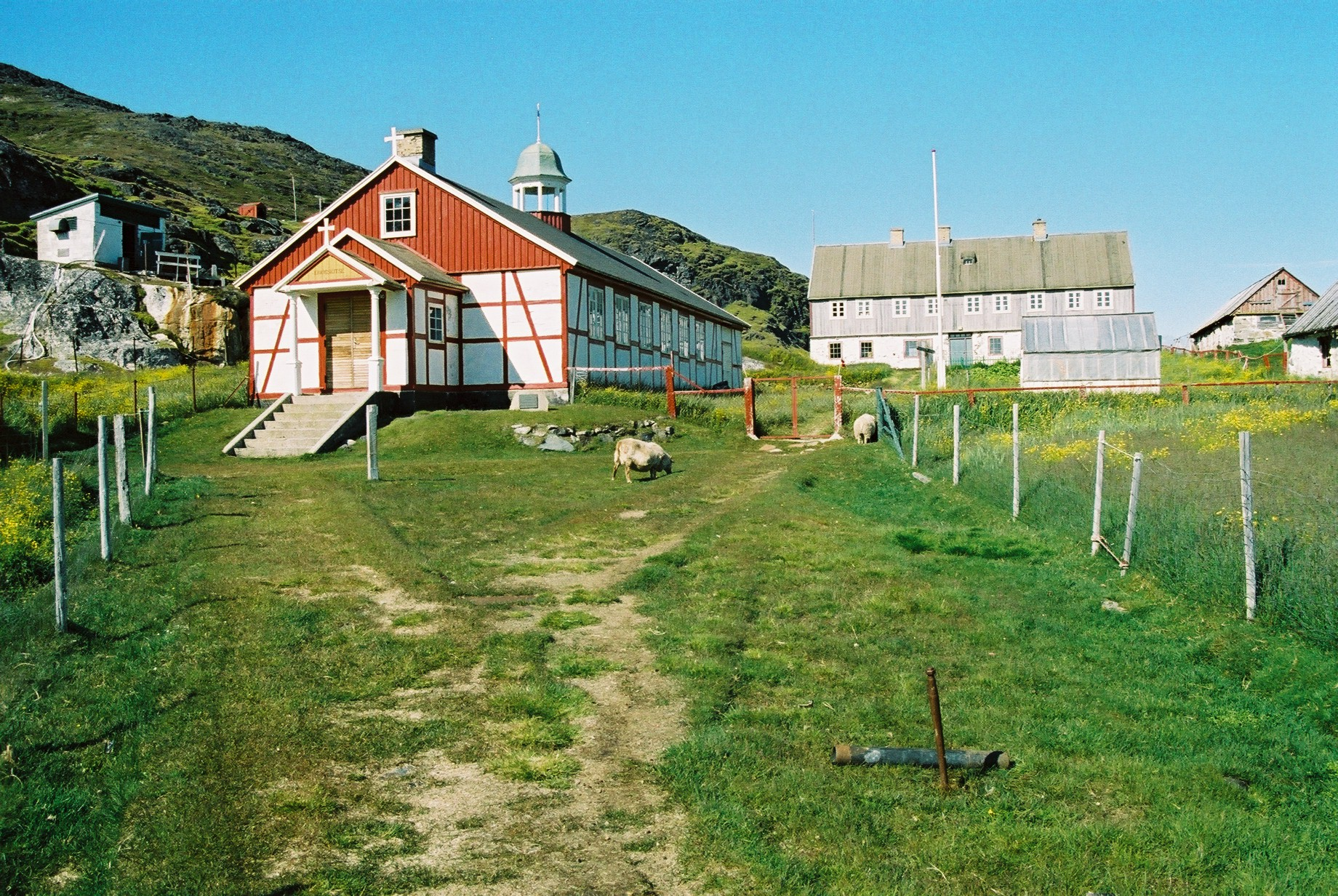
Alluitsoq

Crab fishing, hunting for hooded seals, and fishing from small boats are the main sources of income for the area's inhabitants. Between 2004 and 2013, the Nalunaq goldmine was active in Kirkespir Valley (Kirkespirdalen; 60°21′34″N 44°49′54″W ), 30 km north Nanortalik. There were plans to build a road between Nanortalik and the mine so workers could live in the town. But the decision and planning took too long, so the company built simple apartments for the workers at the mine. It was less attractive for Greenlanders to live at such a place, so most workers were from other countries.

During the spring, many Greenlanders hunt hooded seals among the outer islands, where the pack ice drifts up from the east coast on its way north. The age-old culture of the Inuit lives on in this annual hunting tradition.

Nanortalik has little productive trade. There are no factories and no large-scale fishing activities as sea ice prevents fishing for several months a year. Small-scale fishing, crab fishing, seal and seabird hunting and tourism provide most local revenue. Decades ago, a graphite mine operated some 20 km from the town, but it was abandoned in 1925.

== Flora and fauna ==
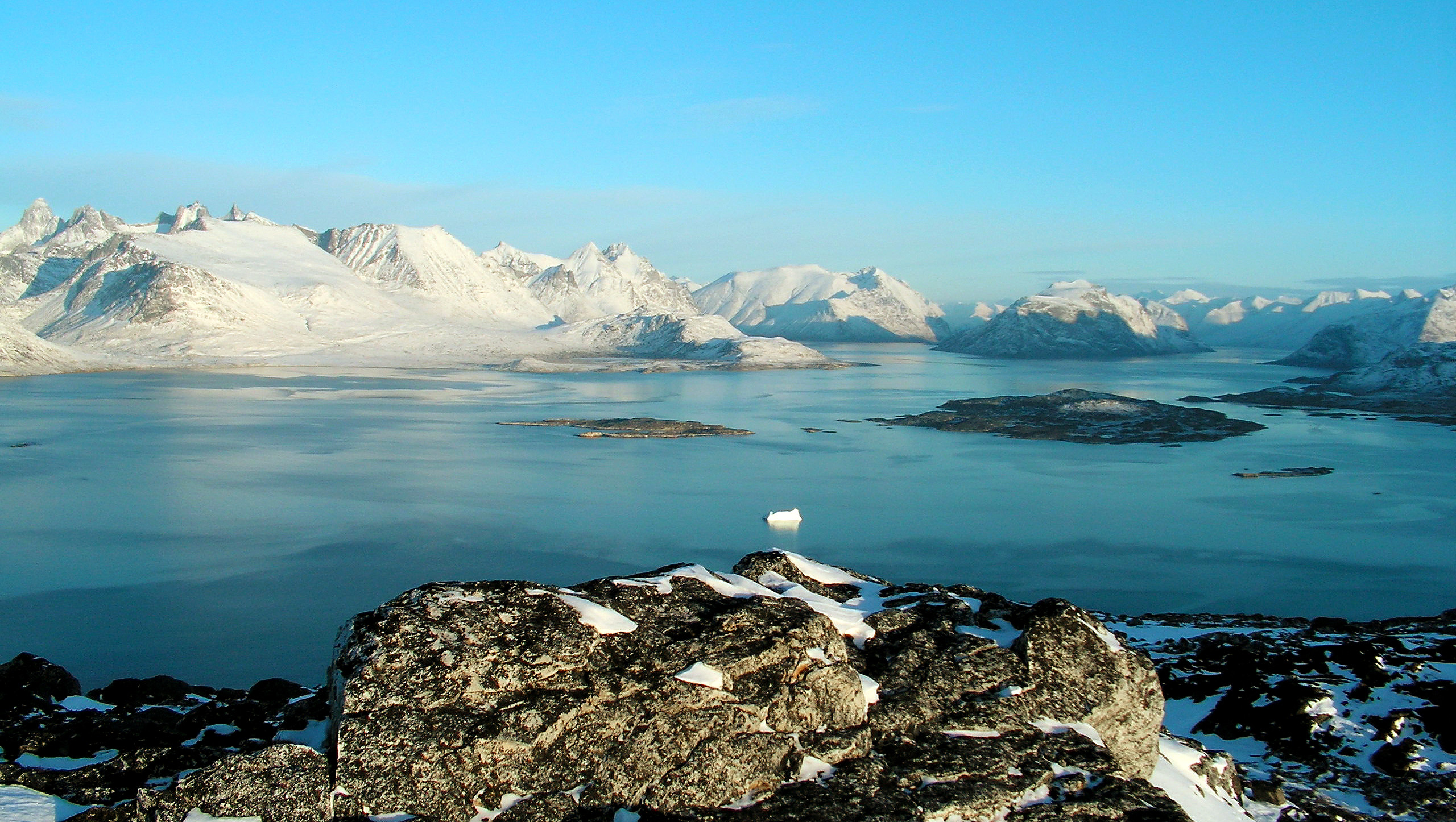
A typical December scene from Nanortalik, viewed from the top of Ravnefjeldet. In December, icebergs (see foreground) are scarce, but will in springtime dominate the fjords.

While Greenland is almost completely without trees, the Qinngua Valley some 40 km from Nanortalik town has the only forest in Greenland (at 60°17′38″N 44°29′45″W). Here, willow (Salix glauca) and birch (Betula pubescens) grow up to several meters. Most other places, trees grow to a maximum of about half a meter. The valley also has some 300 other plant species, and many lichens.

The wildlife of the Nanortalik Island is rather sparse due to native hunters. As a result, ravens, seagulls and snow buntings are some of the very few abundant larger bird species, and no mammal larger than a mouse is likely to be seen. However, the surrounding areas count numerous species.

In addition to seals, the pack ice also brings polar bears from the east coast – hence the name Nanortalik. Every year a number of bears are sighted in the area, but they are rarely a threat to people. During the spring and late summer, there are many whales in the waters around the town; minke whales are most common.

Bird life includes raven, ptarmigan, glaucous gull, Iceland gull, snow bunting, guillemot, eider, king eider, gyrfalcon, white-tailed eagle, redpoll, red-necked phalarope, various sandpipers, red-breasted merganser, red-throated diver, great northern diver, cormorant, long-tailed duck, puffin, northern wheatear, little auk, various ducks, and more rarely, snowy owls.

Despite the allusion to polar bears in its name, they are rare sights in Nanortalik, but occasionally come drifting in on sea ice from East Greenland from January to June.

=== Marine mammals ===
Seals are common in surrounding fjords. Most common is the ringed seal, followed by the hooded seal and harp seal.

From August until October minke whales are common near the opening of the Tasermiut Fjord. Occasionally, humpback whales and orcas are spotted.

== Population ==
With 1,072 inhabitants as of 2024, Nanortalik is the third-largest town in the Kujalleq municipality. The population has decreased over the last several years. Most towns and settlements in southern Greenland have had negative growth over the last two decades, with many settlements rapidly depopulating.

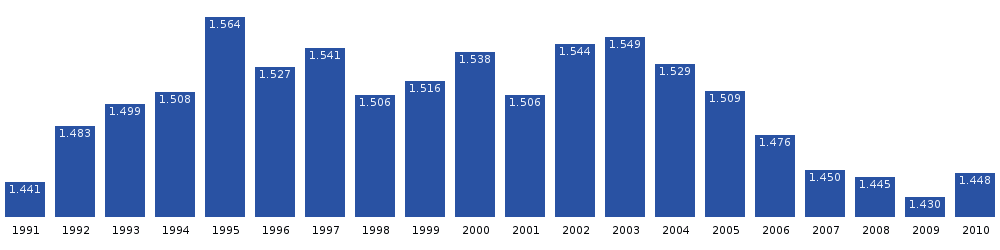
Nanortalik population growth dynamics, 1991-2010. Source: Statistics Greenland

=== Notable people ===
- Kristine Raahauge, Greenlandic municipal politician, activist, eskimologist and writer
- Henning Jakob Henrik Lund, Greenlandic lyricist, best known for writing "Nunarput, utoqqarsuanngoravit", the national anthem of Greenland

== Transport ==
Nanortalik Heliport operates year-round as a helicopter hub of Air Greenland, linking Nanortalik with all regional settlements and Narsarsuaq Airport, and hence indirectly with the rest of Greenland and with Europe.

== Points of interest ==
- Angissq LORAN-C transmitter
- Cape Farewell, Greenland, the southernmost point of Greenland
- Nanortalik Museum

== Twin Towns ==
- Kolding, Denmark
- Roskilde, Denmark
- Ísafjörður, Iceland
