= Time in the Danish Realm =

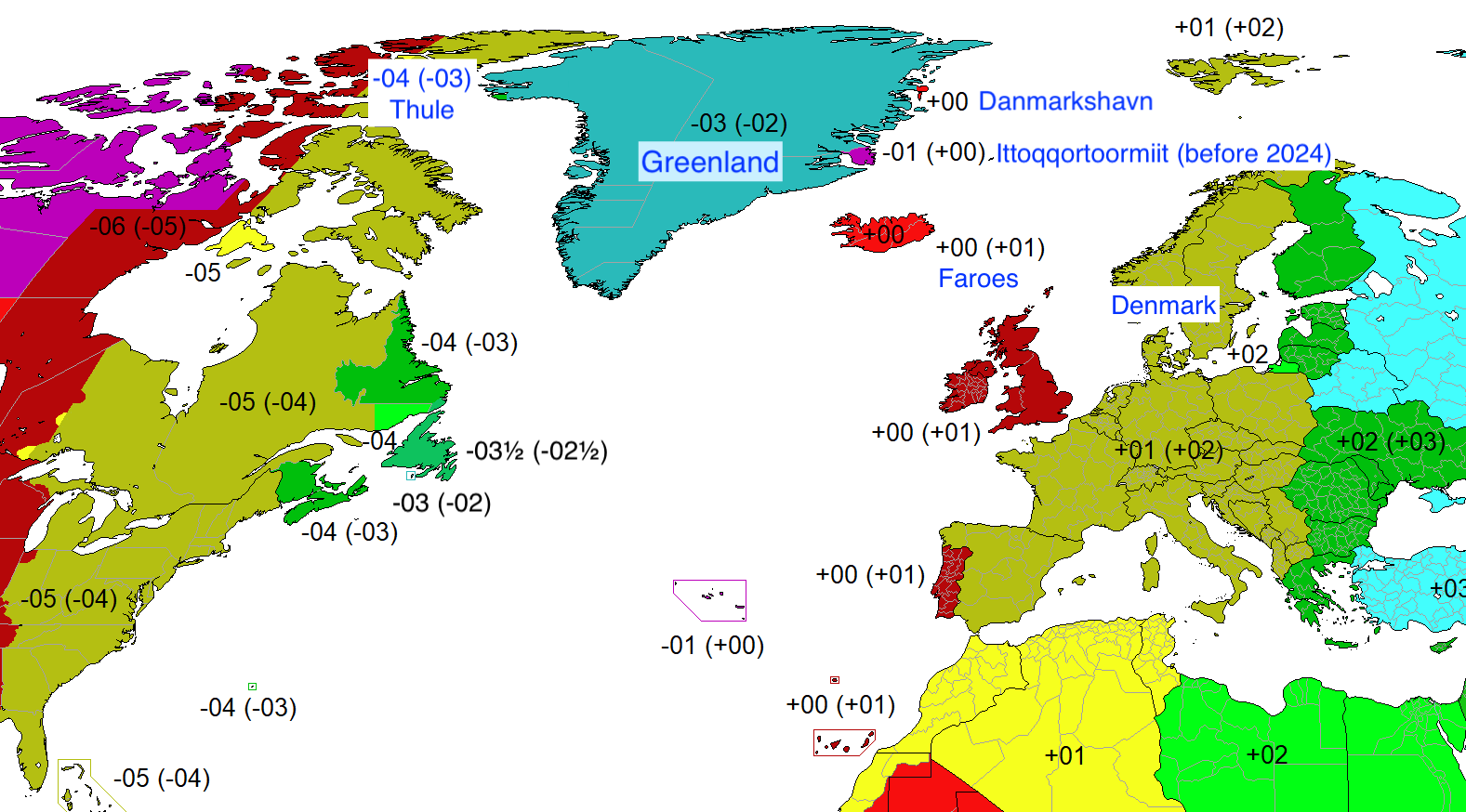
Time zones of the Danish realm and North Atlantic as of mid-2024

Time in Europe: Light Blue / Western European Time / Greenwich Mean Time (UTC); Blue / Western European Time / Greenwich Mean Time (UTC); Blue / Western European Summer Time / British Summer Time / Irish Standard Time (UTC+1); Red / Central European Time (UTC+1); Red / Central European Summer Time (UTC+2); Yellow / Eastern European Time / Kaliningrad Time (UTC+2); Ochre / Eastern European Time (UTC+2); Ochre / Eastern European Summer Time (UTC+3); Green / Moscow Time / Turkey Time (UTC+3); Turquoise / Armenia Time / Azerbaijan Time / Georgia Time / Samara Time (UTC+4); ▉▉▉▉ Pale hues: Standard time observed all year ▉▉▉ Dark hues: Daylight saving time

The Danish Realm, including its dependencies of the Faroe Islands and Greenland, and metropolitan Denmark, uses six time zones.

Area	Standard time	Daylight time		tz database
Denmark	UTC+01:00	UTC+02:00	EU transition dates	Europe/Copenhagen
Faroe Islands	UTC+00:00	UTC+01:00	EU transition dates	Atlantic/Faroe
Parts of Northeast Greenland National Park; Danmarkshavn; Station Nord	UTC+00:00	(no DST)		America/Danmarkshavn
Ittoqqortoormiit	UTC−02:00	UTC−01:00	EU transition dates	America/Scoresbysund
Western Greenland	UTC−02:00	UTC−01:00	EU transition dates	America/Godthab
Pituffik Space Base	UTC−04:00	UTC−03:00	U.S. transition dates	America/Thule

== Time zones ==
=== Central European Time ===
UTC+01:00 as standard time, and UTC+02:00 as daylight saving time, with transition dates according to the European Union rules.

- All of Denmark proper.
  - Including Copenhagen, Aarhus and Rønne (Bornholm)

The UTC+01:00 centerline (15°E) goes through Bornholm, approximately 2 kilometers from Gudhjem, in the far eastern Denmark, while Copenhagen at 12°34′E corresponds to UTC+0:50, and the west coast at 8°6′E corresponds to UTC+0:32.
An 1893 law set the de jure standard time of Denmark as the mean solar time 15°E of Greenwich, for all of Denmark, with an exception for the Faroe Islands, effective at 1 January 1894. This linked the standard time in Denmark to Earth's rotation, and clocks in Denmark were considered to be at noon, when the sun is directly above the 15° Eastern meridian. On 14 March 2023, the Folketing adopted a proposal to set the de jure standard time of Denmark as UTC+1, with exceptions made for Greenland and the Faroe Islands. The proposal became effective law on 26 March 2023 at 2:00, superseding the 1893 law.

=== Western European Time ===
UTC+00:00 as standard time, and UTC+01:00 as daylight saving time.

- The Faroe Islands

The island of Mykines is actually located at 7°36′W longitude and thus at UTC−00:31 (closer to UTC−01:00 than UTC), however Mykines uses the same time zone as the rest of the Faroe Islands.

=== Greenwich Mean Time ===
UTC+00:00 year around, no daylight saving time

- The northeast coast of Greenland. There are a few settlements, like the weather station Danmarkshavn, otherwise unpopulated.

The area uses same time as Iceland (WET), since it is generally supplied from Iceland.

=== West Greenland Time ===
UTC−02:00 as standard time, and UTC−01:00 as daylight saving time.

- All the west coast of Greenland
  - Including Qaanaaq, Ilulissat, Kangerlussuaq, Nuuk and Qaqortoq
- Tasiilaq, Kulusuk, Ittoqqortoormiit, Neerlerit Inaat and surrounding area on the east coast Prior to October 29, 2023, the area was on the East Greenland Time.
- Except Pituffik Space Base

=== Atlantic Time ===
UTC−04:00 as standard time, and UTC−03:00 as daylight saving time, with transition dates according to the United States rules.

- Pituffik Space Base

== Daylight saving time ==
All of Greenland uses Daylight Saving Time, except for the northeast coast. The transition dates are according to the European Union rules, except for the Pituffik Space Base, which uses United States transition dates and for which the following description does not apply.

DST starts at 01:00 UTC on the last Sunday in March and ends same time on the last Sunday in October each year in all affected areas.

That means that in Denmark proper, the transition is at 02:00 Local Standard Time (03:00 Daylight Saving Time) and in the Faroe Islands one hour earlier. In most of Greenland, the transition takes place at 23:00 Local Standard Time on the day before (00:00 Daylight Saving Time).

== History ==
The first time a common time was used in Denmark, was in 1890, when Copenhagen local time was used as railway time. This was GMT+0:50:20 from Greenwich. In 1890 this time was introduced as a standard time for Denmark. In 1893, Denmark adopted the "Act on the Determination of Time", to connect to the international time zones, using Greenwich plus one hour, which set the standard time in Denmark as noon when the sun is directly above 15°E, starting from 1 January 1894. This is the local time of eastern Bornholm, leaving 99.5% of the country west of the time meridian (15°E), which has triggered some sarcastic comments (changing from Copenhagen time to Gudhjem time). However all of the country is located east of Greenwich +00:30 (7.5°E).

Daylight saving time was used in the years 1916, 1940, 1945-1948 and is currently in use since 1980.

The Faroe Islands introduced Greenwich Mean Time in 1908, and Iceland (then a Danish area) introduced GMT-01:00 at the same time (changed to GMT, permanent daylight saving time, in 1968). West Greenland introduced GMT-03:00 in 1916. Daylight saving time was introduced in the Faroe Islands in 1981.

On 25 January 2023, Transport Minister, Thomas Danielsen made a proposal to overrule the 1893 law, with an act to set Danish standard time as UTC+1, with exceptions for Greenland and the Faroe Islands. On 14 March 2023, the Folketing adopted the proposal with unanimous consent, and the proposal came in effect as law on 26 March 2023, at 2:00. Greenland moved the time zone forward one hour simultaneously (on 25 March 2023 local time), after that using UTC−02:00 as the standard time.

== IANA time zone database ==
Data for Denmark directly from zone.tab of the IANA time zone database. Columns marked with * are the columns from zone.tab itself.

c.c.*	Coordinates*	TZ*	Comments*	UTC offset	UTC DST offset	Map
DE	+5230+01322	Europe/Berlin	most of Germany	+01:00	+02:00	
DK	+5540+01235	Europe/Copenhagen		+01:00	+02:00	Redirects to Europe/Berlin.
FO	+6201−00646	Atlantic/Faroe		+00:00	+01:00	
GL	+7646−01840	America/Danmarkshavn	National Park (east coast)	+00:00	+00:00	
GL	+7029−02158	America/Scoresbysund	Scoresbysund/Ittoqqortoormiit	−02:00	−01:00	
GL	+6411−05144	America/Nuuk	most of Greenland	−02:00	−01:00	
GL		America/Godthab		−02:00	−01:00	Redirects to America/Nuuk.
GL	+7634−06847	America/Thule	Thule/Pituffik	−04:00	−03:00	
