= Nancy Campbell =

U.K. writer and poet focusing on the Arctic

- Born: February 12, 1978 (age 48); Exeter, England
- Education: University of Oxford
- Occupations: Poet and essayist, printmaker
- Writing career
- Language: English
- Subjects: Landscape, Art Writing, Art Criticism
- Notable works: The Library of Ice, Disko Bay, Uneasy Pieces, Thunderstone
- Notable awards: TLS Ackerley Prize 2023, RGS Ness Award 2021, Terrain Non-Fiction Prize 2014, Birgit Skiöld Award 2013

Nancy Campbell is a British poet, non-fiction writer and publisher of artist's books. Her first collection of poetry, Disko Bay (2015), was shortlisted for the Forward Prize for Best First Collection. Other works include a book of prose poems Uneasy Pieces (2022), and non-fiction books Thunderstone (2022),The Library of Ice (2018) and Fifty Words for Snow (2020). She served as the UK’s Canal Laureate (2018–19) appointed by the Poetry Society and the Canal & River Trust. In 2021 she received the Royal Geographical Society Ness Award for environmental writing.

== Early life and education ==
Campbell was born in Exeter and grew up in the Scottish Borders and Northumberland. She studied English Literature at the University of Oxford from 1996-9 before training in letterpress printing and typefounding at Barbarian Press, and The New York Center for Book Arts. She subsequently worked for Book Works in London, and specialised in selling fine printing and writers' archives at the antiquarian book dealer Bertram Rota in Covent Garden.

== Residencies and fellowships ==
Campbell was appointed writer-in-residence at Upernavik Museum in Greenland in the winter of 2009-10.

Subsequent residencies in the Arctic and northern Europe, listed below, enabled her to develop her ideas on climate and culture.

Academic fellowships include a semester as visiting professor of literature at the Free University of Berlin, Germany, Germany, and the Otis Fellowship in Environmental Studies at Bates College, Maine, US, both in 2023.

=== Positions held ===
- 2010 Upernavik Museum, Greenland: Writer in Residence
- 2012 Doverodde Book Arts Festival, Denmark: Writer in Residence
- 2012 Síldarminjasafn (Herring Era Museum), Siglufjörður, Iceland: Writer in Residence
- 2013 Words Across Northumberland, UK: Writer in Residence
- 2013-14 Lady Margaret Hall, University of Oxford: Visual and Performing Artist in Residence
- 2015 Herhusið, Iceland: Writer in Residence
- 2015 Ilulissat Kunstmuseum, Greenland: Writer in Residence
- 2017 Jan Michalski Foundation for Writing and Literature, Switzerland: Environmental Writing Fellowship
- 2018-2019 Internationales Künstlerhaus Villa Concordia, Bamberg, Germany: Literature Fellowship
- 2022 Hawthornden Castle, Scotland: Fellowship
- 2023 Peter Szondi Institute, Free University of Berlin, Germany: Visiting Professor

== Other activities ==
In 2025, Campbell is one of three judges for the Creative Future Writers' Award.

== Published works ==
- How to Say 'I Love You' in Greenlandic, Bird Editions, 2011
- Doverrode: Twenty Days in Denmark, Bird Editions, 2012
- ITOQQIPPOQ, Bird Editions, 2014
- Vantar | Missing, Bird Editions, 2014, ISBN 9780992809102
- Disko Bay, Enitharmon Editions, 2015, ISBN 9781910392188 - shortlisted for the Forward Prize for Best First Collection.
- Death of a Foster Son, Bird Editions, 2016, ISBN 9780992809119
- The Polar Tombola: A Book of Banished Words, Bird Editions, 2017, ISBN 9780992809126
- The Library of Ice: Readings from a Cold Climate, Simon and Schuster, 2018, ISBN 9781471169311 - longlisted for the Rathbones Folio Prize.
- Navigations, Happenstance Press, 2020, ISBN 9781910131596
- Fifty Words for Snow, Elliott & Thompson Ltd, 2020, ISBN 978-1783964987
- Uneasy Pieces, Guillemot Press, 2022, ISBN 978-1913749330
- Thunderstone: Finding Shelter from the Storm, Elliott & Thompson Ltd, 2022, ISBN 9781783966998

== Art writing ==
- Bill Jacklin: Graphics, co-authored with Jill Lloyd, Royal Academy Publications, 2016, ISBN 978-1-910350-40-9

== Collaborations and artist's editions ==
- Dinner and a Rose: a homage to Patricia Highsmith - with Sarah Bodman, Bristol
- Songbook of Rare Feelings: courage, humility, remorse - with Ensemble VONK, The Netherlands
- Tikilluarit - with Roni Gross and Peter Schell, Z'roah Press, New York City
- The Night Hunter - with Roni Gross and Peter Schell, Z'roah Press, New York City
- Song for the Small Hours - Incline Press, Oldham, 2022
