= List of museums in Greenland =

This is a list of museums in Greenland.

== Museums in Greenland ==
- Greenland National Museum
- Aasiaat Museum
- Ilulissat Art Museum
- Nanortalik Museum
- Nuuk Art Museum
- Qaqortoq Museum
- Sisimiut Museum
- Upernavik Museum
- Ilulissat Kunstmuseum in Ilulissat
- Ittoqqortoormiit Museum in Ittoqqortoormiit
- Knud Rasmussens Museum in Ilulissat
- Maniitsoq Muuseum in Maniitsoq
- Narsaq Museum in Narsaq
- Narsarsuaq Museum in Narsarsuaq
- Paamiiut Museum in Paamiut
- Qaanaaq Museum in Qaanaaq
- Qasigiannguit Museum in Qasigiannguit
- Qeqertarsuaq Museum in Qeqertarsuaq
- Uummannaq Museum in Uummannaq

== See also ==
- List of museums
