= Bodman =

Bodman is a surname. Notable people with the surname include:

- Henry Bodman (1864–1927), Australian politician
- Johannes Wolfgang von Bodman (1651–1691), German Roman Catholic bishop
- Nicholas Bodman (1913–1997), American linguist
- Nikolaus Bodman (1903–1988), German nobleman
- Roger Bodman (born 1952), American politician
- Samuel Bodman (1938–2018), American politician
- Sarah Bodman, British artist and scholar known for her work with artist's books
- Wilf Bodman (born c.1933), former racing cyclist from Wales

== See also ==
- Bodman PLC, an American law firm
- Bodman-Ludwigshafen, a municipality on Lake Constance, Baden-Württemberg, Germany
