= Bible museum =

Bible museum may refer to any of the following museums:

- Bible Lands Museum in Jerusalem
- Bible Museum Münster in Münster, Germany
- Bible and Orient Museum in Fribourg, Switzerland
- Bijbels Museum in Amsterdam
- Ernst Glück Bible Museum in Alūksne, Latvia
- Museum of the Bible in Washington, DC
- Nordic Bible Museum in Oslo, Norway
- Shrine of the Book, Israel Museum, Jerusalem
