= Creative Future =

Creative Future(s) may refer to:

== Organisations ==
- Creative Future (British organisation), an organisation supporting emerging writers from underrepresented groups
- CreativeFuture, an American advocacy organization protecting intellectual property in the entertainment industry

== Programmes and initiatives ==
- Creative Future, a programme for youth run by the Hackney Empire theatre in London, UK
- Creative Futures (Ethiopia), a programme for young creatives initiated by the British Council in Ethiopia in 2016
- Creative Futures (Ford Foundation), a 2020 initiative inviting 40 creatives to submit essays on the future of art and journalism

== Other uses ==
- A Creative Future, a 2022 House of Lords select committee inquiry (also referred to as Creative Futures)
- Creative Future: Cymru Creadigol, a 2002 Welsh government strategy for the creative industries in Wales
- Creative Futures (BBC), a project to restructure the BBC beginning in 2005

== See also ==
- Creative Future Writers' Award, awards by the British organisation Creative Future
- Creative Futures Bursary Project, a scheme operated by British advertising industry magazine Creative Review
- Our Creative Future, an election manifesto issued by Creative UK
