= Kristine Raahauge =

Greenland politician (1949–2022)

Kristine Marie Raahauge
- Born: November 26, 1949; Ilulissat, Greenland
- Died: February 7, 2022 (aged 72); Kolby Kås, Samsø Island, Denmark
- Occupations: municipal politician, activist, Eskimologist and writer
- Notable work: Cultural Encounters at Cape Farewell: The East Greenlandic Immigrants and the German Moravian Mission in the 19th Century (2011)
- Title: Mayor of the Nanortalik municipality
- Term: 1993–1997, 2005–2009
- Political party: Siumut
- Children: 3
- Awards: Julius Bomholt Prize (2012)

Kristine Marie Raahauge (November 26, 1949 – February 7, 2022) was a Greenlandic municipal politician, activist, eskimologist and writer. She represented the Siumut party.

== Early life and family ==
Raahauge was born in 1949 into a seal-catching family in the remote village of Ilulissat, Greenland. She was the oldest of seven children.

When she was nine years old, Raahauge and her family moved to the town of Nanortalik. Her isolated home village is now depopulated.

On March 25, 1972, Raahauge married Paul Raahauge, a schoolteacher born in Denmark. They had three children Anja, Brit and Axel. In 1976, the family moved to Kolby Kås on Samsø Island, and they both worked at a boarding school where 60 Greenlandic children attended.

== Museum career ==
Raahauge and her husband moved to Nanortalik, where he worked at the local school. She became a member of the Greenland Museums Committee from 1991 to 1995. She was later employed as Director of the Nanortalik Museum until 1993.

== Political career ==
Raahauge was a member of the Siumut political party. In 1993, Raahauge was elected Mayor of the Nanortalik municipality. She served as mayor until 1997.

Raahauge ran for office in the 1995 parliamentary elections and was elected to the Inatsisartut for a term. During her term, she fought against centralisation and to preserve local self-government. She chose not to run again in the 1999 elections.

In 2004, after the resignation of Tage Frederiksen, Raahauge was re-elected mayor with the four votes from Siumut and two from Inuit Ataqatigiit (IA). She served until the 2009 administrative reform, where the number of municipalities in Greenland was reduced to four.

== Awards ==
In 2012, Raahauge was awarded the Julius Bomholt Prize from the Ministry of Culture for her book Cultural Encounters at Cape Farewell: The East Greenlandic Immigrants and the German Moravian Mission in the 19th Century, which she researched with Danish museum employees Einar Lund Jensen and Hans Christian Gulløv. The book has been reviewed in academic journals including the Journal of Moravian History, the International Bulletin of Mission Research and Polar Record.

== Death ==
Raahauge retired in 2014. She died in 2022 in her home at Kolby Kås on Samsø Island, where she and her husband had returned to. She was 72 years old at the time of her death. Her ashes were scattered over Samsø Bælt.
