= Rune Arnhoff =

Norwegian entrepreneur (born 1958)

- Born: January 5, 1958 (age 68)
- Occupations: Entrepreneur, businessman

Rune Arnhoff (born January 5, 1958) is a Norwegian entrepreneur, businessman, and Bible collector. He is known for starting construction industry supplier Relekta in 1977 and building the company over the following decades. In April 2015, the company was sold to the publicly traded Swedish company Indutrade. Under Arnhoff's leadership, the company won the award for "Employer of the Year" in the European Business Awards, competing with 32,000 other companies from across Europe. Arnhoff was the CEO of the Relekta group until February 29, 2016.

== Career ==
He has also established the Nordic Bible Museum, which opened its doors to the public on June 1, 2018. Arnhoff has the largest Bible collection in the Nordic countries and the Nordic Bible Museum exhibits a wide range of rare and unique Bibles from the collection.
