= Elizabeth Newbery =

Bookseller and publisher (c. 1745–1821)

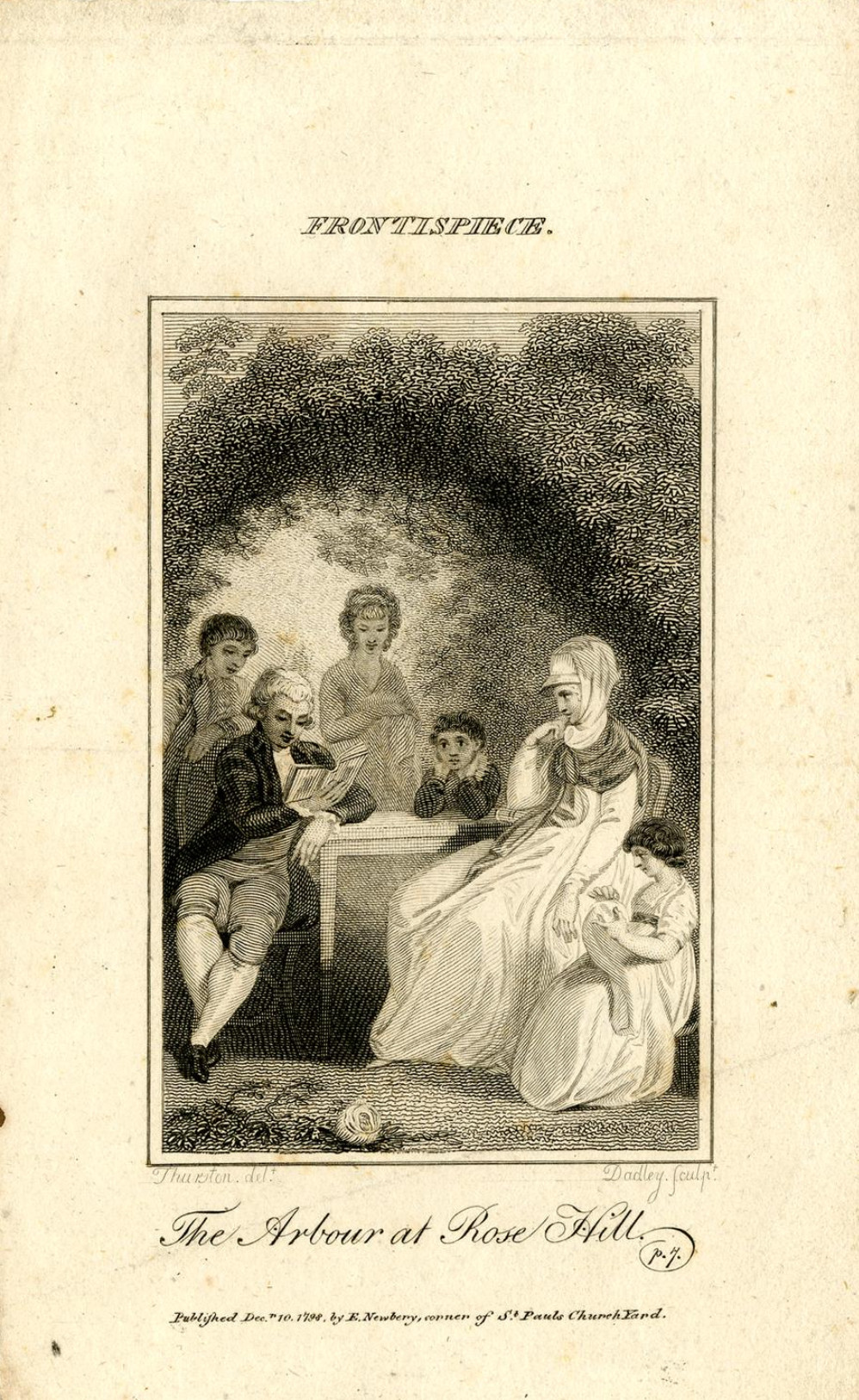
- The Rose at Arbour Hill published by Elizabeth Newbery corner of St Paul's churchyard in 1798
- Born: Elizabeth Bryant; 1745
- Died: 21 October 1821 (aged 75–76); Clapham
- Occupation: Printer
- Employer: self-employed
- Known for: publishing books for children
- Spouse: Francis Newbery

Elizabeth Newbery born Elizabeth Bryant (1745 – 21 October 1821) was a British bookseller and publisher, notably of children's book at the "corner of St Paul's churchyard" in London.

== Life ==
Newbery's early life is unclear. There are indications that her name was Elizabeth Bryant up to 24 April 1766 when she married Francis Newbery in the City of London. He died in January 1780 and she was his sole executor. Her husband had been in business with his cousin Francis Newbery (son of John) and Thomas Carnan who was his cousin's son. That partnership ended and her husband created his own successful printing business at 20 Ludgate Street. She was left the business and his shares. Francis owned a twelfth share in the lucrative Gentleman's Magazine.

The Ludgate Street business had a fire in 1786 and survived.

Some accounts have assumed that Elizabeth's role was minor but she ran the business for 22 years. At a time when children's book were becoming fashionable her business published 300 titles for juveniles and three quarters of them had her imprint.

The business had first published a children's bible in 1757. A pocket bible was published in 1772 and in 1780 Newbery printed a Thumb Bible that had pages that were an inch and a half by an inch and a quarter. The bible had 256 pages that abridged both the old and new testaments.

The engraver Thomas Bewick was employed by Newbery to illustrate Arnaud Berquin's Looking-Glass for the Mind in 1792 and John Huddlestone Wynne's 'Tales for Youth: In Thirty Poems' in 1794. Berquin's book was notable because it contained a subscribers list of over 110 individuals. This was unusual for a children's work. All of the subscribers were in the home counties.

She sold the printing business to the then manager John Harris in 1802.

Newbery died in Clapham in 1821. She was a rich woman and she left specific bequests. Her gifts to women were made through trusts to ensure that they and not their husbands had control.

== Publications ==
- (with John Wallis) The New Game of Human Life, 1790
