= Hromnice =

- Municipality
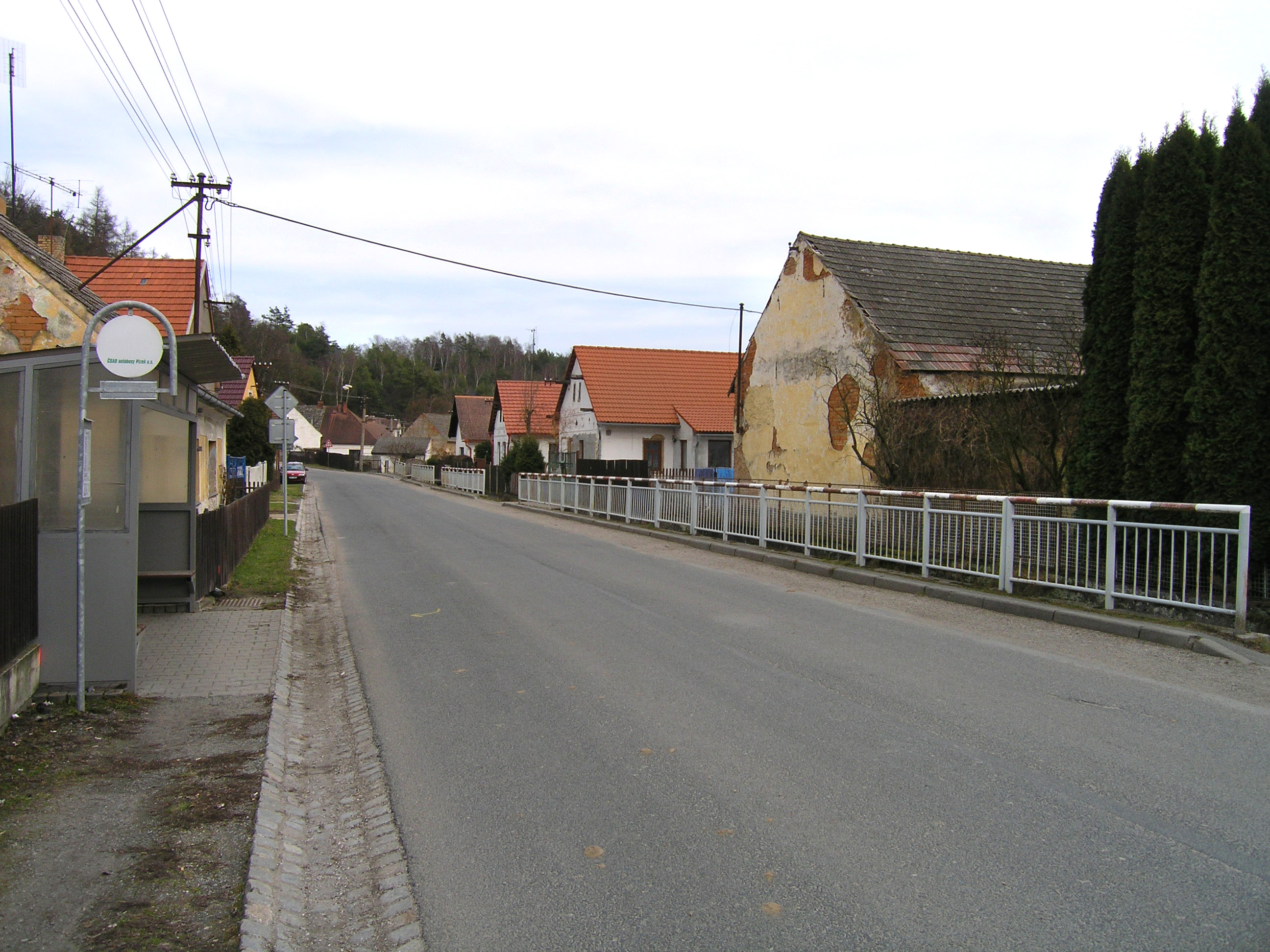
- Main street in Hromnice

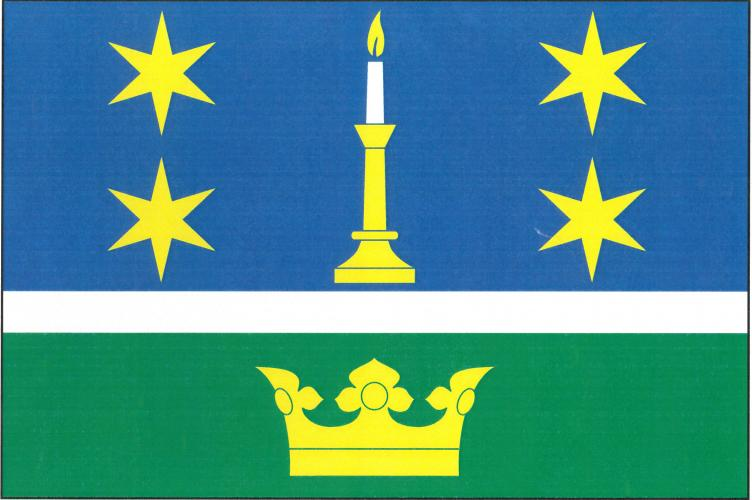
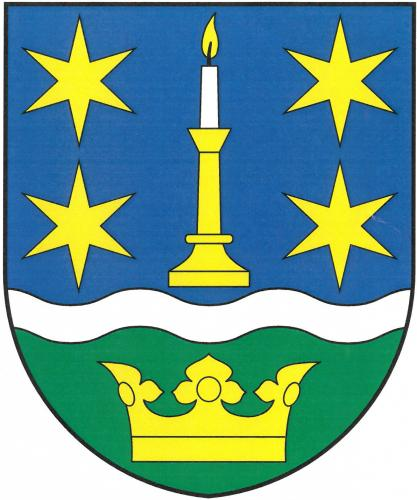
- Flag Coat of arms

- Location in the Czech Republic
- Coordinates: 49°50′57″N 13°26′29″E
- Country: Czech Republic
- Region: Plzeň
- District: Plzeň-North
- First mentioned: 1181

Area
  - Total: 36.23 km^{2} (13.99 sq mi)
- Elevation: 350 m (1,150 ft)

Population (2026-01-01)
  - Total: 1,349
  - Density: 37.23/km^{2} (96.44/sq mi)
- Time zone: UTC+1 (CET)
  - Summer (DST): UTC+2 (CEST)
- Postal code: 330 11
- Website: www.hromnice.cz

Hromnice is a municipality and village in Plzeň-North District in the Plzeň Region of the Czech Republic. It has about 1,300 inhabitants.

Hromnice lies approximately 13 kilometres (8 mi) north-east of Plzeň and 75 km (47 mi) west of Prague.

== Administrative division ==
Hromnice consists of six municipal parts (in brackets population according to the 2021 census):

- Hromnice (465)
- Chotiná (134)
- Kostelec (43)
- Nynice (76)
- Planá (93)
- Žichlice (420)

== Demographics ==
Historical population
| Year | Pop. | ±% |
|---|---|---|
| 1869 | 1,851 | — |
| 1880 | 2,153 | +16.3% |
| 1890 | 2,063 | −4.2% |
| 1900 | 2,057 | −0.3% |
| 1910 | 2,233 | +8.6% |
| 1921 | 2,118 | −5.2% |
| 1930 | 2,210 | +4.3% |
| 1950 | 1,564 | −29.2% |
| 1961 | 1,474 | −5.8% |
| 1970 | 1,311 | −11.1% |
| 1980 | 1,162 | −11.4% |
| 1991 | 1,028 | −11.5% |
| 2001 | 986 | −4.1% |
| 2011 | 1,087 | +10.2% |
| 2021 | 1,231 | +13.2% |
Source: Censuses

== Notable people ==
- Jan Sobota (1939–2012), fine bookbinder
