= Jan Sobota =

Czech-Swiss bookbinder (1939–2012)

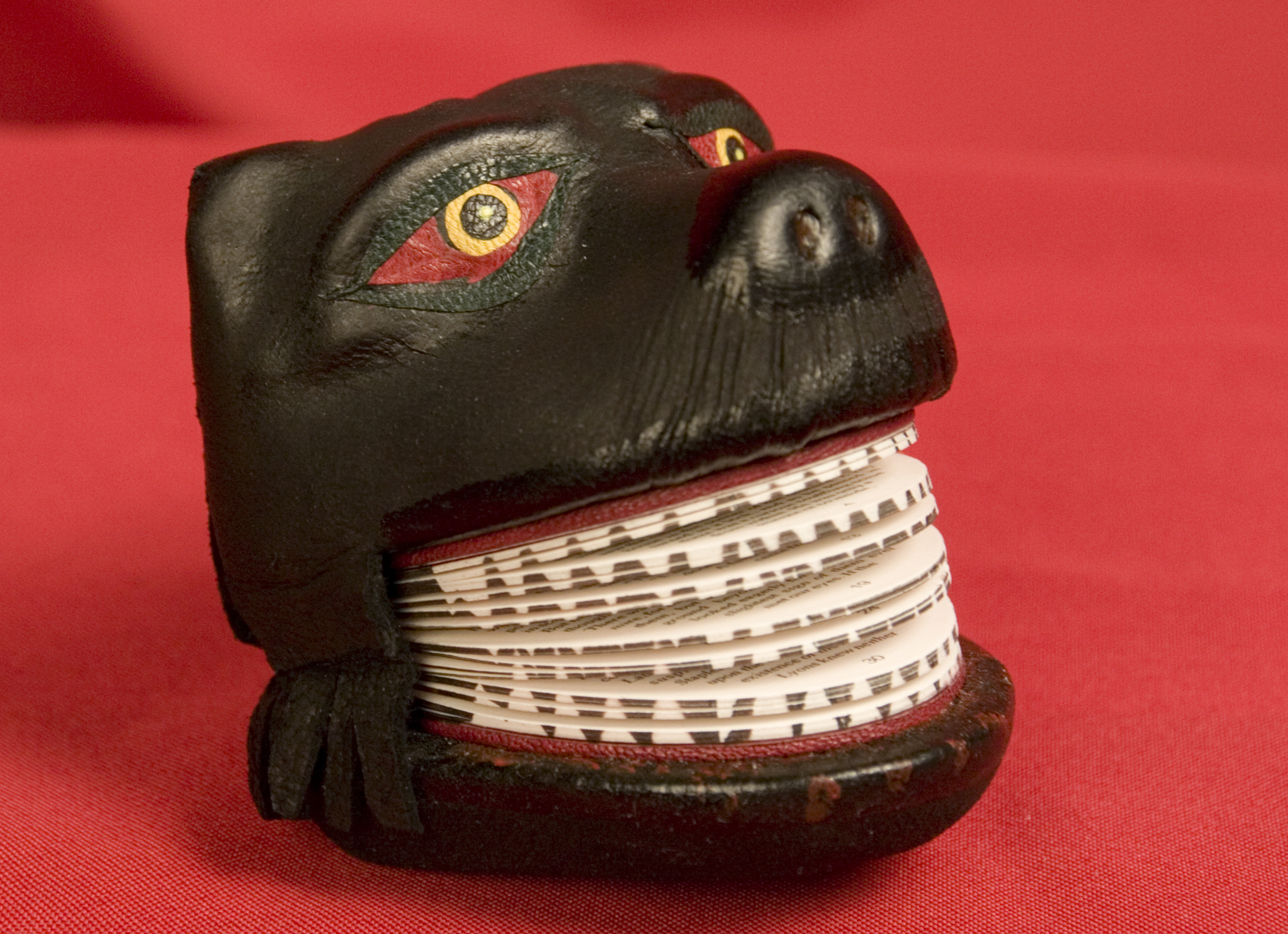
Hound of the Baskervilles by Jan and Jarmila Sobota

Jan Bohuslav Sobota (1 March 1939 – 2 May 2012) was a Czech-Swiss fine bookbinder. He is known for his often playful sculptural bindings that transform the book into a three-dimensional work of art.

== Career ==
Sobota was born on 1 March in Hromnice, Czechoslovakia. The son of a book collector, Sobota trained in Czechoslovakia as an apprentice in the Plzeň workshop of Karel Šilinger and graduated from the Academy of Applied Arts, Prague, in 1957. He completed his master's degree at the same institution in 1969, and in 1979, was declared "Meister der Einbandkunst" in Germany. The same year, he submitted the first ever sculptural book to the Czech triennale. Sobota organized the first international exhibition of book sculpture in 1982, "The Book as Artistic Object in an Interior," staged in Františkovy Lázně.

In 1982, Sobota and his family defected to Switzerland, where he worked privately and demonstrated bookbinding in Basler Papier Muhle. In 1984 the Sobota family moved to the US, sponsored by the Rowfant Club of Cleveland, a prestigious book collectors' club in Cleveland. Members of the international book community also sought to help him. Extensive Czech training in book conservation prepared him for positions as a book conservator at Case Western Reserve University and at the Bridwell Library at Southern Methodist University. With his wife Jarmila Sobota he established the Saturday's Book Arts Gallery, which moved with the couple. In 1997, the Sobotas moved back to the now Czech Republic, where they opened a gallery in Loket.

Sobota died on 2 May 2012 in Loket, at the age of 73.

== Legacy ==
Sobota is known for books of all sizes, particularly miniature books. Between 1969 and 2012, his work was displayed in 35 individual shows and 160 group exhibitions. He was posthumously awarded a Lifetime Achievement Award by the Guild of Bookworkers in 2012.
