= Miniature book =

Very small book

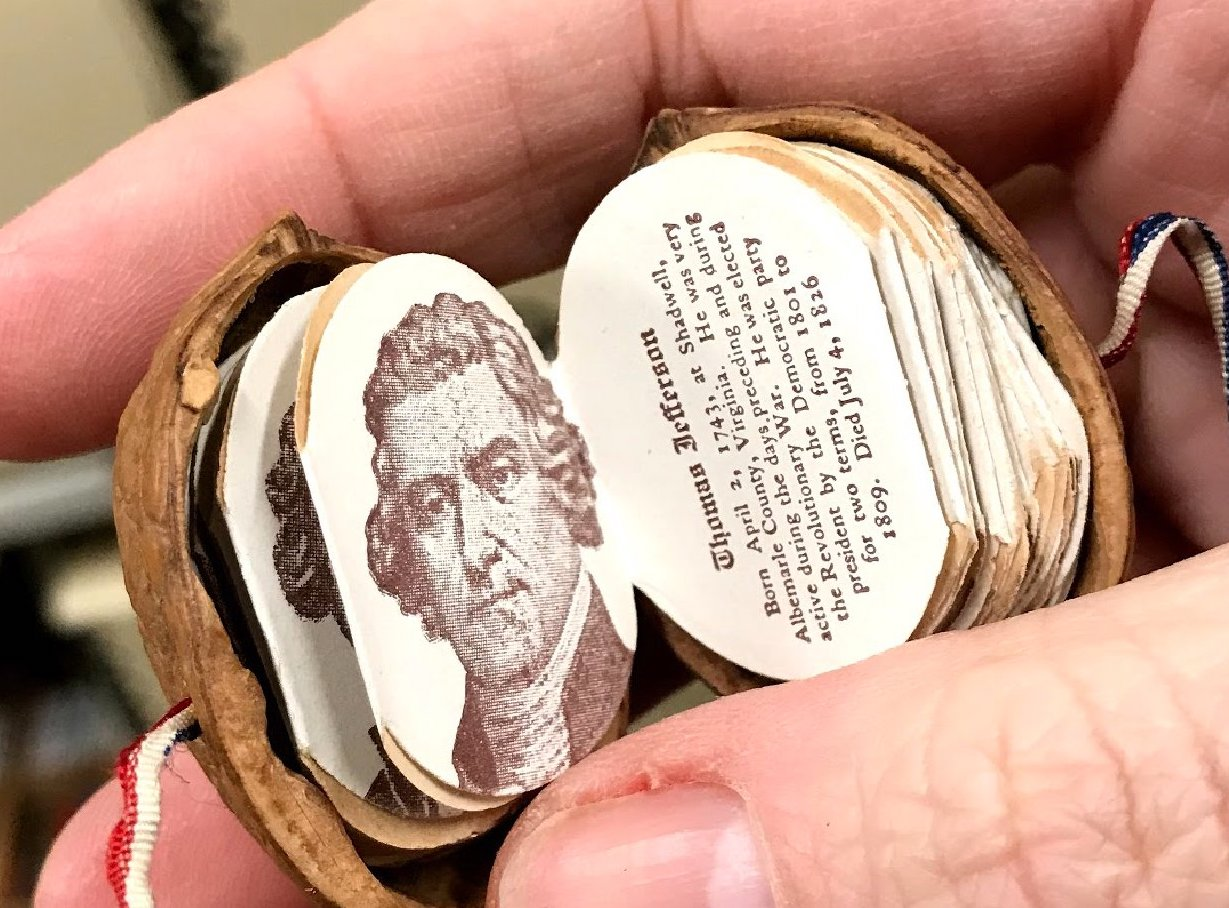
The United States History and Presidents in a Nutshell, c. 1904

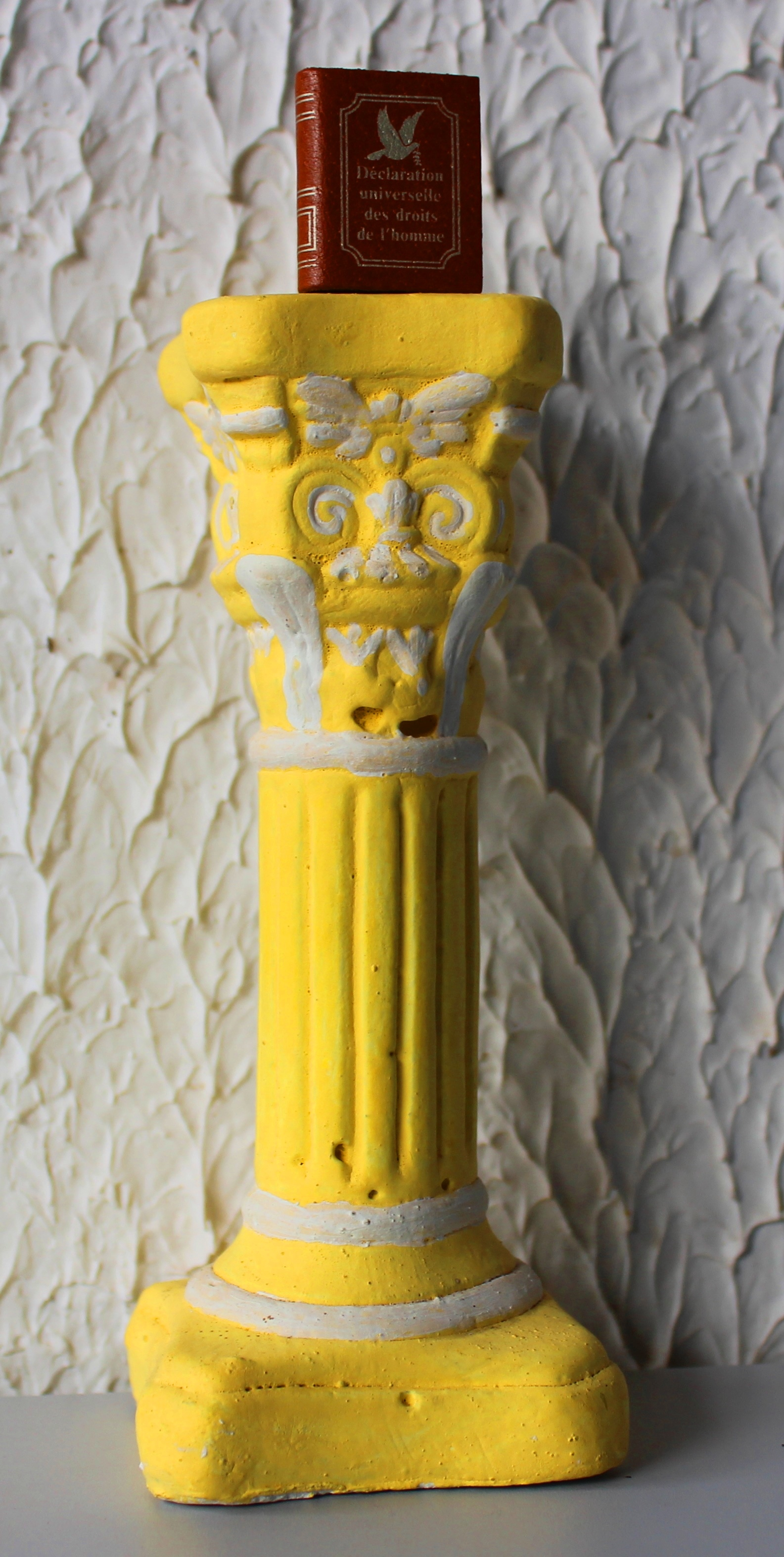
Universal Declaration of Human Rights

A miniature book is a very small book. Standards for what may be termed a miniature rather than just a small book have changed through time. Today, most collectors consider a book to be miniature only if it is 3 inches or smaller in height, width, and thickness, particularly in the United States. Many collectors consider nineteenth-century and earlier books of 4 inches to fit in the category of miniatures. Book from 3–4 inches in all dimensions are termed macrominiature books. Books less than 1 inch in all dimensions are called microminiature books. Books less than 1/4 inch in all dimensions are known as ultra-microminiature books.

== History ==
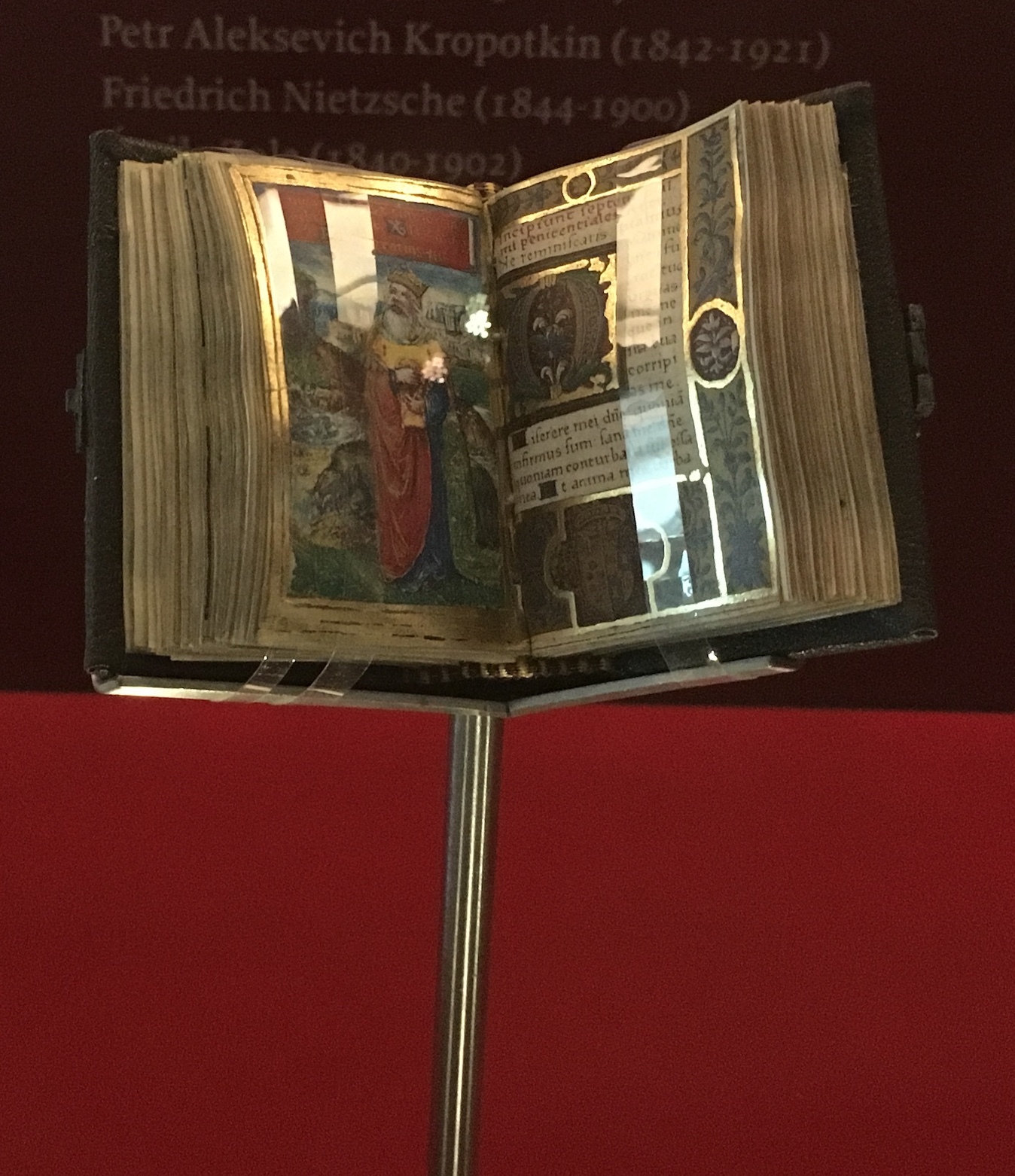
A 16th-century miniature book of hours. Lázaro Galdiano Museum, Madrid, Spain

Miniature books stretch back far in history; many collections contain cuneiform tablets stretching back thousands of years, and exquisite medieval Books of Hours. Printers began testing the limits of size not long after the technology of printing began, and around 200 miniature books were printed in the sixteenth century. Exquisite specimens from the 17th century abound. In the 19th century, technological innovations in printing enabled the creation of smaller and smaller type. Fine and popular editions alike grew in number throughout the 19th century in what was considered the golden age for miniature books. While some miniature books are objects of high craft, bound in fine Moroccan leather, with gilt decoration and excellent examples of woodcuts, etchings, and watermarks, others are cheap, disposable, sometimes highly functional items not expected to survive. Today, miniature books are produced both as fine works of craft and as commercial products found in chain bookstores.

Miniature books were produced for personal convenience. Miniature books could easily be carried in the pocket of a waistcoat or a woman's reticule. Victorian women used miniature etiquette books to subtly ascertain information on polite behavior in society. Along with etiquette books, Victorian women that had copies of The Little Flirt learned to attract men by using items already in their possession, such as, gloves, handkerchiefs, a fan and parasol. In 1922, miniature books regained popularity when 200 postage stamp sized books were created to be displayed in the miniature library of Queen Mary's miniature doll house. Princess Marie Louise, a relative of Queen Mary also requested that living authors contribute to the existing dollhouse library. Following in Queen Mary footsteps, many miniature book collectors begin collecting miniatures for their dollhouse libraries. A miniature book has even been to the Moon. In 1969, Apollo 11 astronaut Buzz Aldrin had a miniature book in his possession during his flight to the Moon. It was an autobiography of Robert Hutchings Goddard, who invented the first liquid-propellant rocket that make space flight possible.

Some popular types of miniature books from various periods include Bibles, Qur'ans, encyclopedias, dictionaries, bilingual dictionaries, short stories, verse, famous speeches, political propaganda, travel guides, almanacs, children's stories, and the miniaturization of well-known books such as The Compleat Angler, The Art of War, and Sherlock Holmes stories. The appeal of miniature books was holding the works of prominent writers, such as William Shakespeare in the person's hands.

== Notable miniatures ==
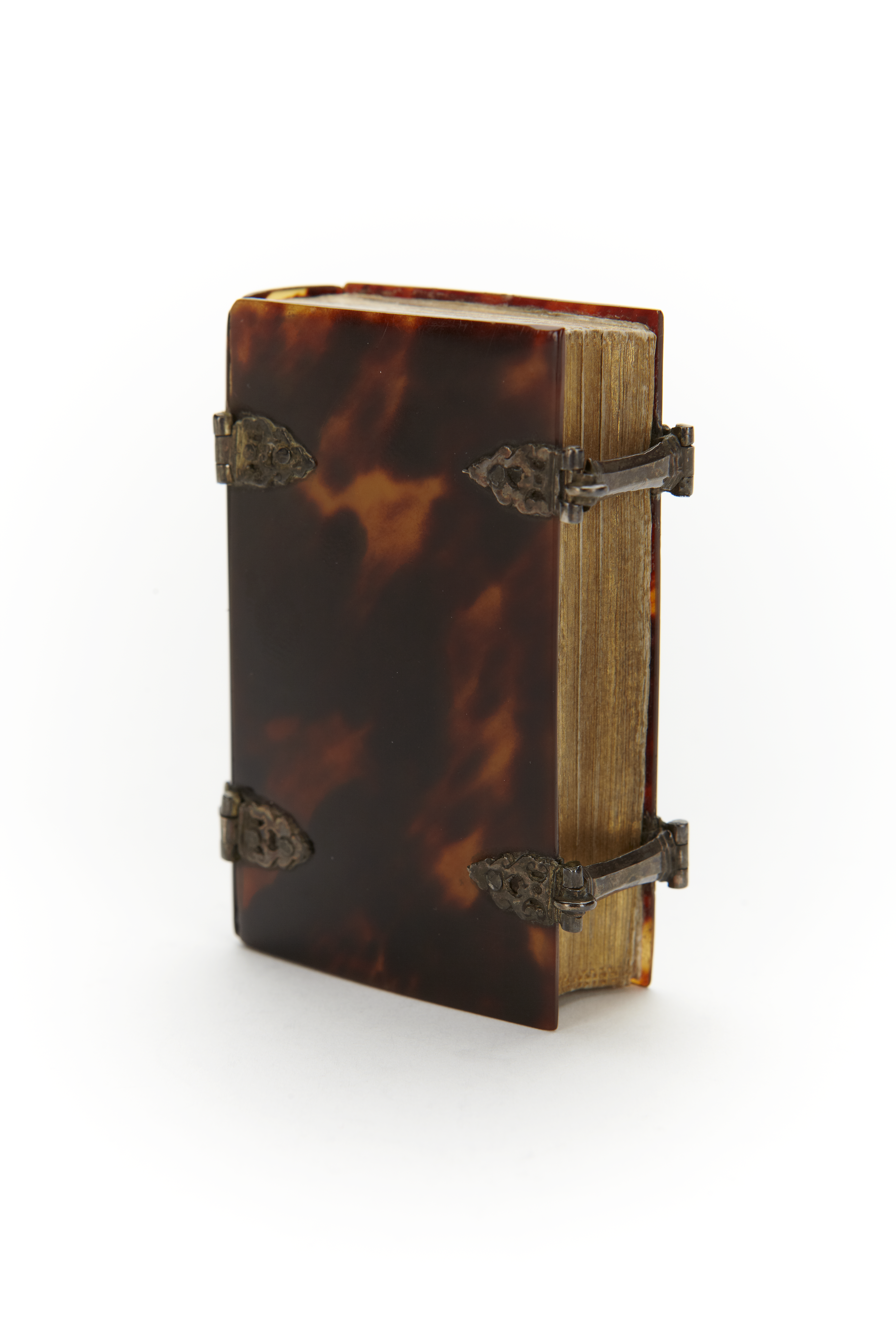
Ambrosius Lobwasser: Die Psalme Davids: Nach fransösischer Melodeij in Teutsch Reimen gebracht. Basel, 1659 (a miniature book bound in tortoiseshell)

Abraham Lincoln, Proclamation of Emancipation (Boston : John Murray Forbes, 1863). This miniature edition was the first of this text. It is estimated that a million copies were distributed to Union troops.

=== Miniature editions of works not originally published in miniature form ===
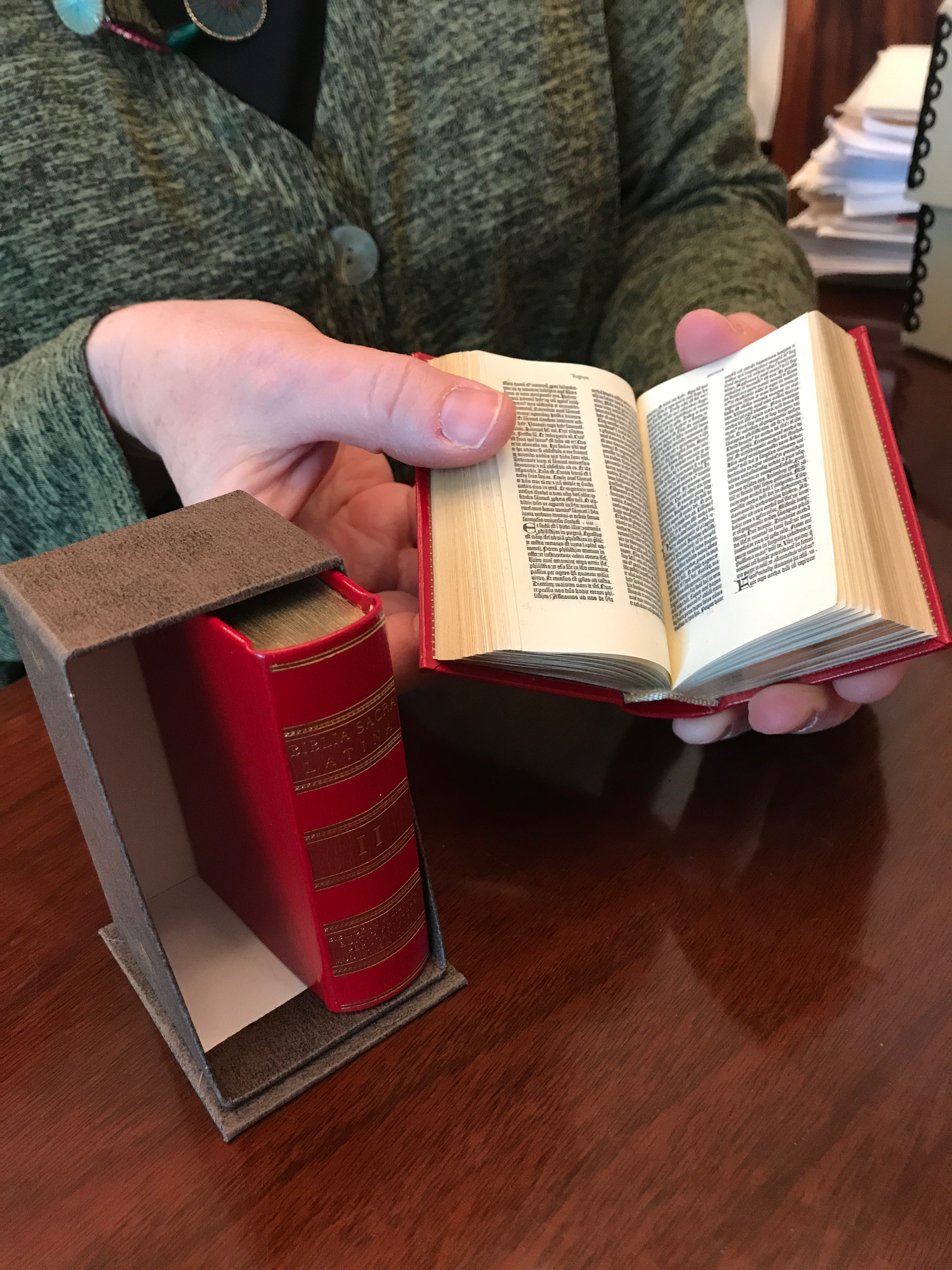
Miniature facsimile edition of the Gutenberg Bible (Leipzig: Minaturbukverlag, 2017)

- Diamond Classics - published in London by William Pickering, from 1819
- Liliput-Bibliothek - published in Leipzig by Schmidt & Günther from ca. 1909
- Bibliothèque miniature - published in Paris by Payot from ca. 1918
- Collection Bijou - published by Editions Nelson in Paris from ca. 1920
- Miniature Constitution of Ukraine
- Thumb Bibles

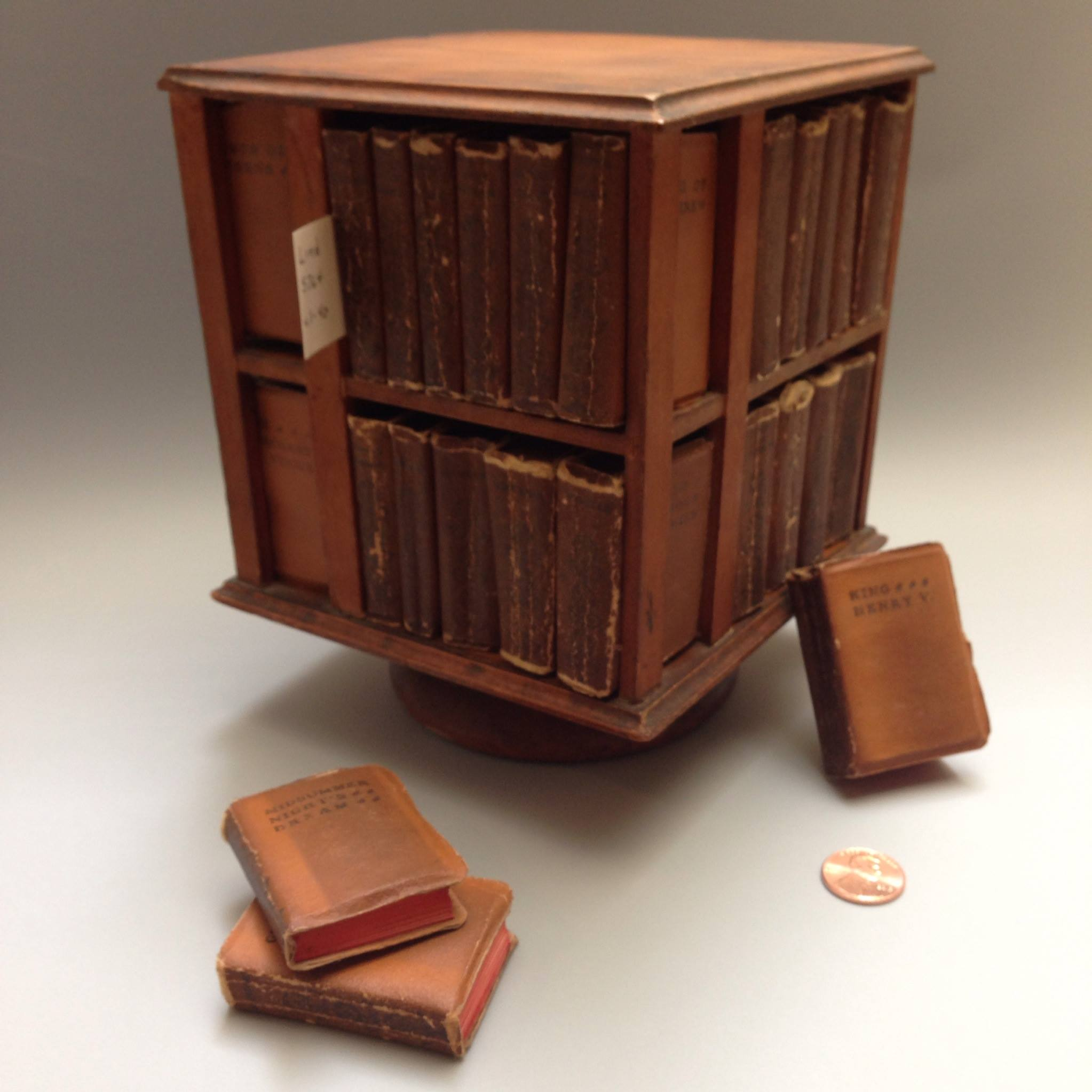
The Ellen Terry Shakespeare Glasgow: David Bryce and Son; New York; Frederick A. Stokes Co. [1904]. Remains the smallest edition of the complete works of Shakespeare. Albert and Shirley Small Special Collections Library. Photograph by Molly Schwartzburg.

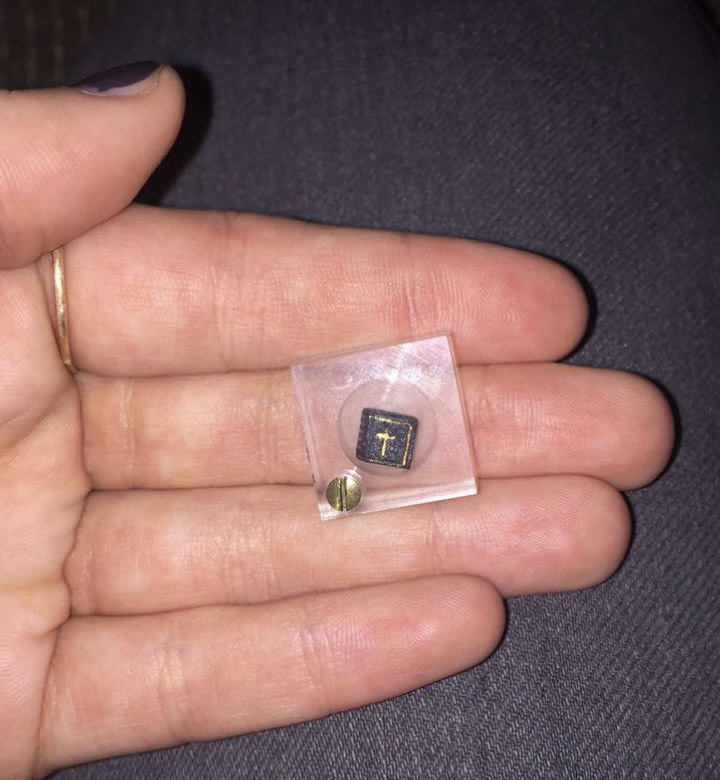
Popular miniature book, The Lord's prayer: [in 7 languages], by publisher Waldmann & Pfitzer in 1952. Advertised as "The World's Smallest Book" at 5 x 5 mm. Copy seen here in the Mills College Heller Rare Book Room, Fine Press Collection.

=== "Smallest book in the world" ===
Many books have claim to the title of smallest book in the world at the time of their publication. The title can apply to a variety of accomplishments: smallest overall size, smallest book with movable type, smallest printed book, smallest book legible to the naked eye, and so on.

750: Hyakumantō Darani or 'One Million Pagoda Dharani'' Also one of the earliest known printed texts, these 2-3/8" tall Buddhist charms were printed, rolled into a scroll, placed in miniature white pagodas, and distributed to Buddhist temples. A million were printed at the command of Japanese Empress Shōtoku.

1674: Bloem-Hofje (Amsterdam: Benedict Schmidt, 1674). For more than two centuries, this remained the smallest book printed with moveable type.

1878: Dante, Divina Commedia (Milan: Gnocchi, 1878). 500 pages. 5 cm × 3.5 cm. Typeset and printed by the Salmin Brothers of Padua.

1897: Galileo Galilei. Galileo a Madama Cristina di Lorena (Padua: dei Fratelli Salmin, 1897). 150 pages. This remains to this day the smallest book set from movable type.

1900: Edward Fitzgerald, trans. The Rubaiyat of Omar Khayyam (Cleveland: Charles H. Meigs, 1900).

1932: The Rose Garden of Omar Khayyam.

1985: Old King Cole (Paisley: Gleniffer Press, 1985). Height: 0.9 mm. For 20 years this was the "smallest book in the world printed using offset lithography".

2001: New Testament (King James version) Cambridge: M.I.T, (2001). 5 × 5 mm.

2002: Anton Chekhov, Chameleon (Omsk, Siberia: Anatoly Konenko, 1996) 0.9 mm × 0.9 mm.

2006: ABC books in Russian and Roman characters (Omsk, Siberia: Anatoly Konenko, 1996). 0.8 mm × 0.8 mm

2007: Teeny Ted from Turnip Town (category: world's smallest reproduction of a printed book. Single sheet, not codex format.) 0.07 × 0.10 mm

2016: Vladimir Aniskin, [Untitled] (Russia: Vladimir Aniskin, 2016). "The micro-book consists of several pages, each measuring only very tiny fractions of a millimeter: the precise size of the pages is 70 × 90 micrometers or 0.07 × 0.09 millimeters—too small to be read by the naked human eye. Made by gluing white paint to extremely thin film, the pages are hung from a tiny ring binder that allows them to be turned. The whole construction rests on a horizontal sliver of a poppy seed."

=== Charms, talismans, and amulets ===
In 2007, archaeologists found a miniature Bible (Glasgow: David Bryce & Son, 1901) tucked into a child's boot hidden in a chimney cavity in an English cottage in Ewerby, Lincolnshire. Shoes were placed in such locations as early as the fourteenth-century as anti-witchcraft devices known as "spirit traps".

== Publishing, printing, and binding in miniature ==
The creation of a miniature book requires exceptional skill in all aspects of book production, because elements such as bindings, pages, and type, illustrations, and subject matter all need to be approached with a new set of problems in mind. For instance, the pages of a miniature book do not fall open as do those of larger books, because the pages are not heavy enough. Bindings require exceptionally thin materials, and creating type that is readable and beautiful requires great skill. Many printers have created miniature books to test their own technical limits or to show off their skill. Many books have claimed the sought-after title of "smallest book in the world," which is now held by experiments in nanoprinting.

=== Publishers ===
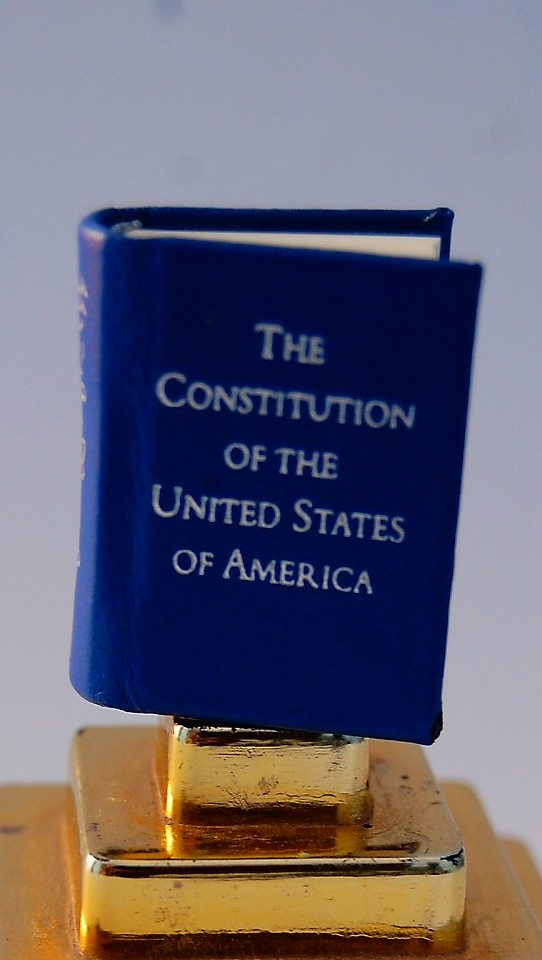
The Constitution of the United States, in miniature version

- Good Book Press, Santa Cruz, California
- Dawson's Book Shop, Los Angeles, California
- Gloria Stuart, the film actress, published numerous miniature books as collaborations with significant printers
- The Smallest Books in the World, Peru
- Achille St. Onge

==== Commercial publishers ====
- David Bryce and Son, one of the most prolific makers of miniature books. They published over 40 titles, including the smallest English dictionary in the world.
- HarperCollins, Collins Gem Books division.
- Oxford University Press published many miniature religious books and children's books in the late 19th and early 20th century.
- Running Press, known for miniature books marketed as impulse buys in bookstore checkout lines.
- Sanrio, known for tiny blank books in its Hello Kitty, Little Twin Stars, and other lines starting in the late 1960s and early 1970s.

=== Binders ===
- Sangorski & Sutcliffe
- Jan Sobota

=== Artists, designers, typesetters and illustrators ===
- Margaret Hicks

== Collections ==
=== Library collections ===
- The largest known collection of miniature books is the McGehee Miniature Book Collection of almost 18,000 items, at the Albert and Shirley Small Special Collections Library at the University of Virginia. The collection was donated by collector Caroline Yarnall McGehee Lindemann Brandt, a charter member of the Miniature Book Society.
- The second largest known collection is held by the Lilly Library at Indiana University Bloomington. Donated by collector Ruth E. Adomeit, it numbers more than 16,000 items.
- Size as yet unknown while it is being cataloged, the Julian Edison Collection of Miniature Books was donated to the Houghton Library at Harvard University in 2019. Estimates range from 15,000-20,000 volumes.
- In 2020, Jozsef Tari donated his collection of 5,700 miniature books to the Jókai Mór City Library of Pope in Hungary.
- The University of Iowa Special Collections and University Archives holds a collection of 4,000 miniatures donated by collector Charlotte M. Smith, which they feature on tumblr.
- The Library of Congress miniature book collection consists of 1,596 books that are ten centimeters or less in height. The Library of Congress offers digitized materials from the miniature collection, including many editions from the 19th century.
- Rutgers University Library holds some 1,500 volumes in the Alden Jacobs Collection.
- Washington University in St. Louis holds a significant collection, some on view in a permanent exhibition space, donated by Julian and Hope Edison.
- One of the most visited collections at the University of North Texas Library in Denton, Texas, is their miniature book collection that contains around 3,000 items. A few items in the collection were at one time considered the smallest in the world.
- The Jewish Public Library in Montreal hosts the Lilly Toth Miniature Book Collection, a collection of 1,119 books donated by Hungarian Holocaust Survivor Lilly Toth (1925–2021).

=== Museum collections ===
- Armenian Matenadaran contains a total of some 23,000 manuscripts and scrolls—including fragments.
- The Morgan Library & Museum houses more than 8,000 miniature books.
- Queen Mary's Dolls' House at Windsor Castle in Great Britain contains a miniature library of 200 books created expressly for the collection in the 1920s at a 1:12 scale. Along with reference volumes, a Bible and the Quran, the library includes works—some written expressly for the collection—by prominent authors of the day such as Arthur Conan Doyle, Thomas Hardy, and Vita Sackville-West. The books were bound by Sangorski & Sutcliffe, and contained miniature bookplates illustrated by E. H. Shepard.
- The Baku Museum of Miniature Books in Azerbaijan is the only museum dedicated only to miniature books.
- The Museum Meermanno in the Hague, Netherlands contains a significant miniature collection on permanent display.

=== Private collections ===
Prominent historical figures who collected miniature books include President Franklin D. Roosevelt and retailer Stanley Marcus.

== See also ==
- Miniature art
- The News Letter of the LXIVmos
- Pocket edition
