= John Wallis (publisher) =

English board game publisher, bookseller, seller and cartographer

John Wallis (died 1818) was an English board game publisher, bookseller, map/chart seller, print seller, music seller, and cartographer. With his sons John Wallis Jr. and Edward Wallis, he was one of the most prolific publishers of board games of the late 18th and early 19th centuries.

Wallis's company occupied a number of sites in London, England including:

- 16 Ludgate Street (under the name "Map Warehouse") from 1775.
- 13 Warwick Square (under the name "Instructive Toy Warehouse") from 1805.
- 42 Skinner Street, Snow Hill – this address was mainly used by Edward Wallis when working alone or when working with his father, in those cases publishing as "Wallis and Son" or "John & Edward Wallis".
- 188 The Strand – this address being used solely by John Wallis Jr.

== Publications ==
- (with Elizabeth Newbery) The New Game of Human Life, 1790
