= Nanortalik Museum =

Museum in Nanortalik, Kujalleq, Greenland

- Nanortalik Katersugaasiviat
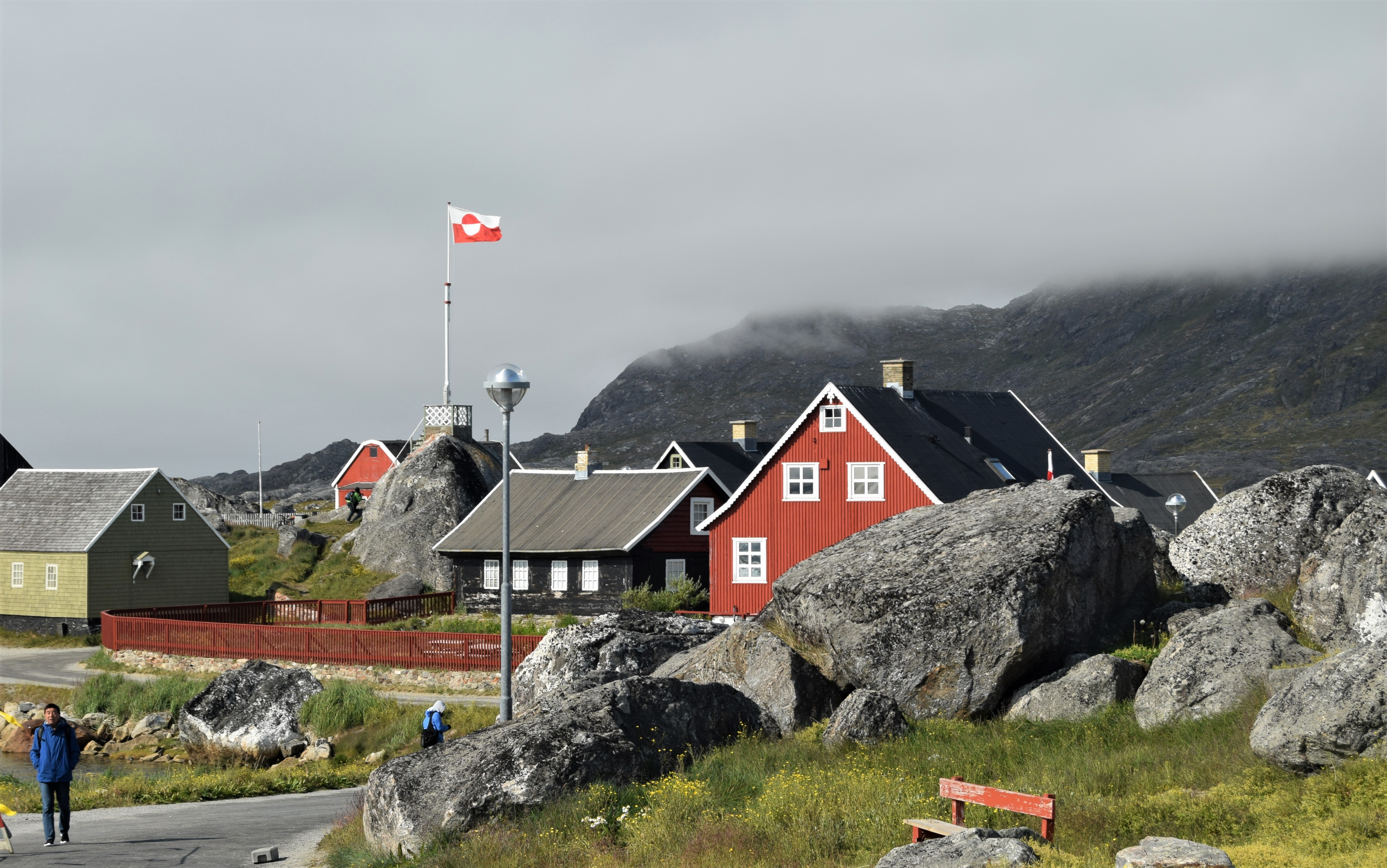
- Museum village
- Location: Nanortalik, Kujalleq, Greenland
- Coordinates: 60°08′12.7″N 45°14′47.2″W
- Type: Open-air museum
- Website: http://www.museum.gl/Nanortalik

The Nanortalik Museum (Greenlandic: Nanortalik Katersugaasiviat) is an outdoor museum in Nanortalik, Kujalleq Municipality, Greenland.

== Architecture ==
The museum consists of 9 historical buildings group together into the museum complex, as well as various artifacts at its outdoor area. The museum is the largest outdoor museum in Greenland.

== History ==
The museum was directed by Kristine Raahauge until 1993.

== See also ==
- List of museums in Greenland
