= Romalyn Ante =

Filipina-british poet

Romalyn Ante FRSL
- Ante at Poets & Players in 2025
- Born: Lipa, Philippines
- Website: www.romalynante.com

Romalyn Ante FRSL is a Filipina-British poet, novelist, and cognitive behavioral therapist. She has received a number of accolades for her work, including the Manchester Poetry Prize.

== Early life and education ==
Romalyn Ante was born in Lipa, Batangas during her hometown's fiesta of San Sebastian. Her grandfather was a manghihilot and shaman. In 2005 at age 16, Ante joined her mother, an NHS nurse, in Wolverhampton, England.

After completing secondary school, Ante studied nursing and specialised in renal dialysis as well as counselling and cognitive behavioural therapy, graduating in 2012. Ante began writing English-language poetry around 2014 and took an Arvon Foundation class in 2016.

== Career ==
Ante became co-founding editor of Harana Poetry and was appointed deputy editor of Ambit. Her debut pamphlet Rice & Rain (V Press) received the 2018 Saboteur Award for Best Poetry Pamphlet. She also won the 2017 Manchester Poetry Prize and the 2018 Poetry London Clore Prize.

In 2019, Ante signed her first book deal with Chatto & Windus (a Penguin Random House imprint), through which she published her debut collection titled Antiemetic for Homesickness in 2020. In the collection, the poet balances writing about her experiences working as an NHS nurse with nostalgia for her childhood in the Philippines. Antiemetic for Homesickness was shortlisted for the 2021 Jhalak Prize and longlisted for the Dylan Thomas Prize. It was named The Observer Poetry Book of the Month and one of the best poetry books of 2020 by Irish Times.

Ante spoke at the 2022 TEDxNHS event titled Reconnected and introduced a selection pamphlet titled Ten Poems About Angels. In 2023, Ante was made a Fellow of the Royal Society of Literature.

In 2024, Ante reunited with Chatto & Windus for her second poetry collection Agimat. The collection also touches on stories from working as a nurse during the COVID-19 pandemic, this time incorporating elements from Japanese occupation in the Philippines as well as the Filipino mythological character, Mebuyan.

In 2025, Ante received the Royal Society of Literature Literature Matters Award for the proposal of a new novel-in-progress Tanker Boys whilst awaiting the publication of her debut novel, The Left-Behind Child.

== Personal life ==
As of 2022, Ante is married. On the side since 2017, she has helped run a Filipino shop in Wolverhampton.

== Bibliography ==
=== Fiction ===
- The Left-Behind Child – novel (Chatto, forthcoming 2026)

=== Collections ===
- Antiemetic for Homesickness (2020)
- AGIMAT (2024)

=== Pamphlets ===
- Rice & Rain (2017)

=== Select contributions ===
- "Half-empty" in Primers Volume Three (2018)
- in The Good Journal #3 (2019)
- in State of Play: Poets of East & Southeast Asian Heritage in Conversation (2023)

=== Selections ===
- Ten Poems About Angels (2022)

== Accolades ==
Year	Award	Category	Title	Result	Ref
2017	Creative Future Writers' Awards	Platinum Poetry	"Way Back Home"	Won	
2017	Manchester Poetry Prize			Won	(Note: Jointly won with Laura Webb)
2018	Saboteur Awards	Best Poetry Pamphlet	Rice & Rain	Won	
2018	Poetry London Clore Prize	First Prize	"Names"	Won	
2021	Dylan Thomas Prize		Antiemetic for Homesickness	Longlisted	
2021	Jhalak Prize		Antiemetic for Homesickness	Shortlisted	
2024	Poetry Book Society	"Autumn Recommendation"	Agimat		
2025	Jhalak Prize	Poetry Prize	Agimat	Longlisted	
