= The News Letter of the LXIVmos =

Publication edited by book collector James Henderson

The News Letter of the LXIVmos was a near-monthly publication edited by book collector James D. Henderson (writing as "The Scrivener") that ran from 1927 to 1929.

== Origin ==
The twenty-one issues focused on miniature books, of which Henderson's collection was already considered to be "the finest ... in the world" when he displayed it at Harvard University as an undergraduate in 1933. The name comes from the book trade and is read "sixty-four-mos", meaning a sheet of paper folded 64 times to form a book with pages of three inches or smaller. Henderson regularly printed answers from his readers to the question "Why collect miniature books since they are too small to read?", with responses ranging from saving space, to pedagogy, to "Everyone should have a hobby."

== Issues and editions ==
The editions were printed in a number of different cities around the world, including a special issue published by the Black Sun Press in Paris. (Note: Minkoff, George Robert (1970), A Bibliography of the Black Sun Press, Great Neck, New York: G. R. Minkoff, p. 60, OCLC 87855 The run was printed on Arches paper and limited to 450 copies, with four additional copies reserved for The New York Public Library, La Bibliothèque Nationale, The Scrivener, and Les Editeurs.) Robert Massmann and Ruth Adomeit published an index to the periodical in 1962. A facsimile edition of the complete run was issued in 1968. (Note: The news-letter of the LXIVmos, Woodstock, VT: Lilliputter Press, 1968, OCLC 2938271. Facsimile edition of the complete publication run.) LXIVmos inspired the creation of the later Miniature Book News and is listed, along with several other works by Henderson, in the Miniature Book Society's Essential References for a Miniature Book Collector.
