= Ernest Dawson =

American bookseller, publisher and mountain climber (1882–1947)

- Born: December 1, 1882; San Antonio, Texas, United States
- Died: November 15, 1947; Los Angeles, California, United States
- Occupations: Antiquarian; Bookseller; Press publisher
- Children: Glen Dawson

Ernest Dawson (1 December 1882 – 15 November 1947) was an American antiquarian bookseller, small press publisher, mountain climber, and Sierra Club president.

Ernest Dawson, born in Texas, moved in 1885 with his parents and siblings to San Luis Obispo, California.

When Ernest Dawson arrived in Los Angeles from San Luis Obispo (he had worked at J.A. Goodrich’s bookstore there) in 1897, he found that the city supported both bookstores specializing in new books and relatively well-stocked second-hand bookshops downtown in a district centered roughly at Broadway and Second Street. ... Henry Ward, a dealer in second-hand paper-covered novels and dime thrillers who had arrived from London in 1891 and settled in Los Angeles in 1894, was a great hand at “ticketing” books and may have been the first bookseller in Los Angeles to install a rental library on his premises. Ward provided Ernest Dawson with his first job in 1897, and Dawson learned many of the merchandising methods he used from Ward.

In 1905 he founded Dawson's Book Shop, a bookstore located at 713 South Broadway in Los Angeles. In 1909 he married Sadie Alena Roberts (1883–1967). In 1912, Dawson's Book Shop published a catalogue (No. 15) with 211 titles. He sold the business in 1912 but repurchased it in 1917. In 1922 he moved the store to 627 South Grand Avenue in Los Angeles. In the 1930s his sons Glen (1912–2016) and Muir (1921–2005) began helping in the business. In the early 1940s the Press for Dawson's Book Shop published print runs of several books. When he died in 1947, his sons Glen and Muir took over the business.

Ernest Dawson was an active climber and expedition leader in the Sierra Nevada and in southern California. He was a Sierra Club director from 1922 to 1925 and from 1926 to 1937 (and also president from 1935 to 1937). In 1928 he and his 15-year-old son Glen, accompanied by two guides, climbed the Matterhorn.
