= Dawson's Book Shop =

Bookstore in Los Angeles, California

Dawson's Book Shop was a bookstore and small press that operated in Los Angeles beginning in 1905. Founded by Ernest Dawson (d. 1947), it was started as a new bookstore, but Dawson soon shifted his attention to rare books, and was known from that time on as a rare book dealer. The business was taken over after his death by his sons Glen Dawson and Muir Dawson. Dawson's specialized in rare books related to California and the West. Today, the shop operates online under the ownership of Michael Dawson.

== Miniature books ==
Starting in 1949, the shop began publishing books, and issued 370 volumes, including a significant number of miniature books on a wide variety of topics. The books often involved the work of printers Karen Dawson, Muir Dawson, and William Cheney; illustrator Tom Neal; and bookbinder Bela Blau. Books produced at the press were sometimes published under different imprints, including Seahorse Press and Dawson Books. Individual volumes were at times printed abroad by presses in Budapest, Hungary; Mexico; and China.
