= Achille St. Onge =

American publisher

Achille St. Onge (January 17, 1913–April 23, 1978) was a publisher of miniature books from Worcester, Massachusetts. St. Onge began publishing miniature books as a hobby in 1935, and by the time he stopped publishing in 1977, he had created 48 miniature books, which are prized by collectors.

St. Onge's publications are known for their uniformity of size and elegance and clarity of design. He oversaw every aspect of the books, and collaborated with many prominent printers, presses, type designers, and binders. Some of these include the Merrymount Press, binders Sangorski & Sutcliffe, printer and papermaker Daniel Berkeley Updike, and book designer and typographer Bruce Rogers. St. Onge published traditional, often revered texts, such as famous speeches by presidents, classic short stories and essays, sermons, eulogies, and brief biographies of famous historical figures.

A miniature book published by St. Onge was the only book taken on the Apollo 11 mission in 1969, and was thus the first book on the moon. It was a copy of Robert Hutchings Goddard: Father of the Space Age (1966). The book's colophon states, "One thousand nine hundred twenty six copies of this book were printed by Joh. Enschedé en Zonen, Haarlem, Holland, and bound by Proost en Brandt N.V., Amsterdam, Holland to commemorate the fortieth anniversary of the launching of the first liquid-propelled rocket at Auburn, Massachusetts, March 16, 1926." St. Onge gave the book to Buzz Aldrin, asking him to take it with him and leave it on the moon. Since he was not permitted to leave it behind, Buzz brought it back with him and gave it to Esther Goddard, Robert Goddard's wife. The book now resides at Clark University's Archives and Special Collections.

== Archives ==
The Achille St. Onge papers reside at Clark University.
