= David Bryce and Son =

Scottish publisher of miniature books

- Industry: Book publishing
- Founded: 1832
- Founder: David Bryce
- Defunct: 1913

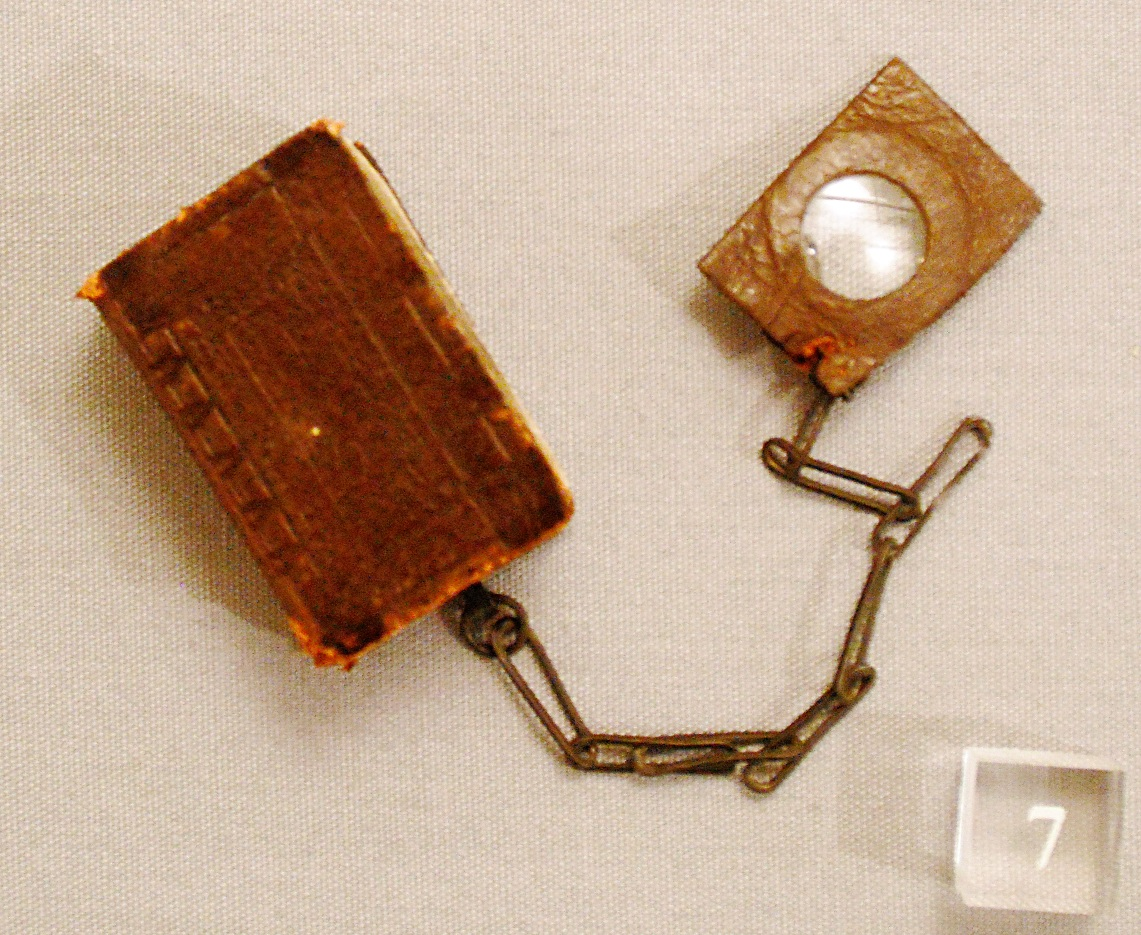
A "Bryce Bible" - a miniature WW1 bible used by British soldiers in the trenches. It comes with its own magnifying glass attached. On display in The Higgins museum and gallery in Bedford as part of a WW1 commemoration.

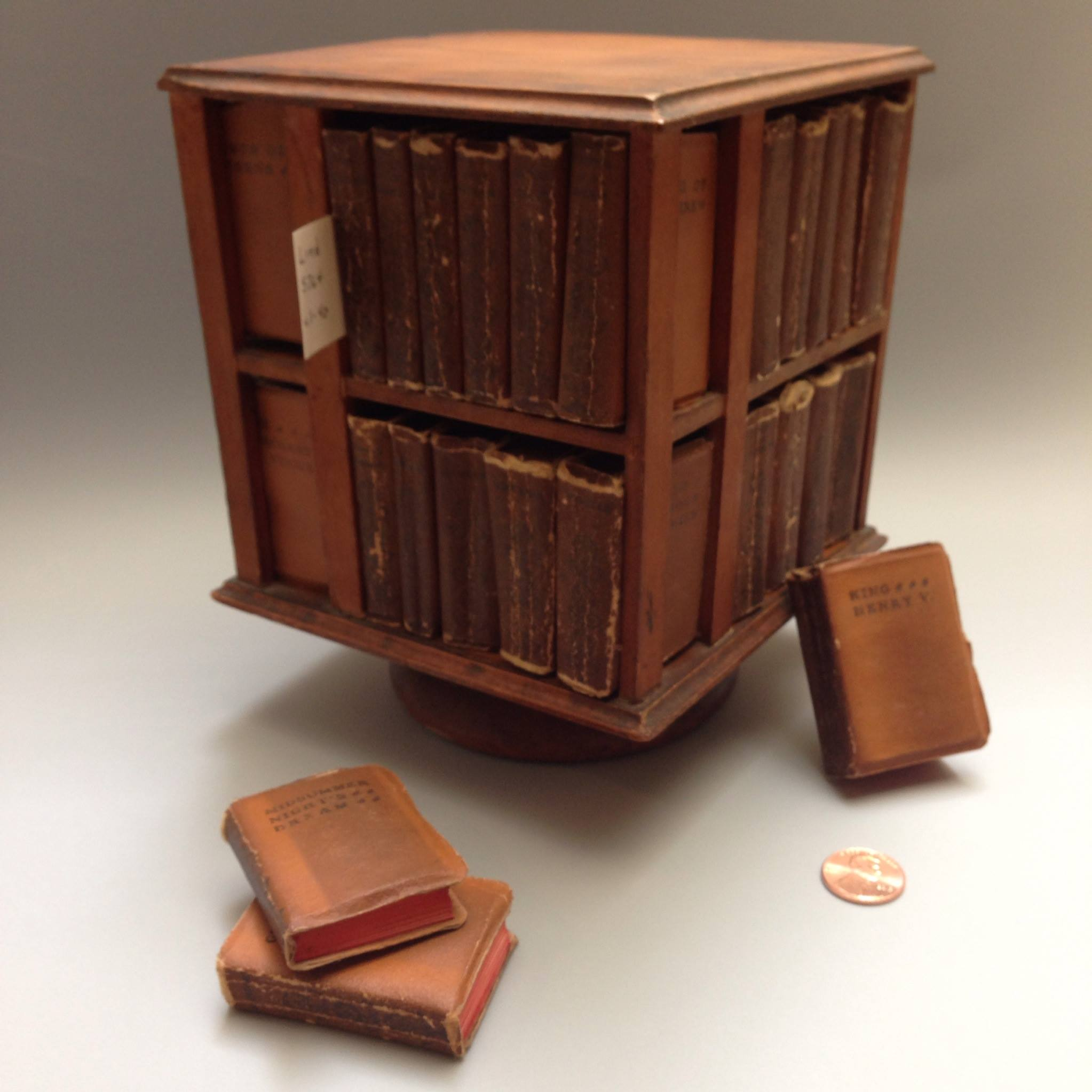
The Ellen Terry Shakespeare Glasgow: David Bryce and Son; New York; Frederick A. Stokes Co. [1904]. Remains the smallest edition of the complete works of Shakespeare. Albert and Shirley Small Special Collections Library.

David Bryce and Son was a Scottish publishing house, known as being one of the most prolific and successful makers of miniature books in the world. It was founded by David Bryce of Glasgow (1845-1923) in 1832. The company published over 40 titles, including the smallest English dictionary in the world, an edition of William Shakespeare's complete works, and a miniature Quran.

== History ==
David Bryce became involved in book publishing around 1876. He commented on the production of miniature books as follows:

Instead of developing works of a larger kind, I descended to the miniature, mite and midget size, producing a little dictionary, the smallest in the world, in a locket accompanied by a magnifying glass. I had many a scoff and jeer as to the absurdity of the production, nevertheless it at once appealed to Mr. Pearson of the notable weekly, who gave me a first order for 3,000 copies and its sales are now over 100,000. Other books followed successfully and latterly a complete Bible. As to the usefulness of such a book one of the commodores of the Castle Packet Lines told me it was the most useful book I had ever published. He constantly carries it in his pocket and reads it with ease with magnifying glass.

Few historical records document Bryce’s life and work; however, correspondence from his colleague Henry Frowde of Oxford University Press show that the two publishers collaborated on the production of miniature books for more than thirty years and participated in transnational networks of the book trade.

Recognizing the commercial potential of religious publications, Bryce employed contemporary printing technologies to mass‑produce pocket‑sized facsimiles of sacred texts from various world religions, such as the Quran and the Bhagavad Gita, for distribution to a global market.

Bryce remained in control of his publishing house until 1913, when financial difficulties led to its acquisition by Gowans & Gray Ltd., a company with which he had shared premises since at least 1911.

In his autobiographical book Seven Pillars of Wisdom, British Army Colonel T. E. Lawrence mentions Bryce's miniature Quran:

He told me later, in strict confidence, that thirteen years before he had bought an amulet Koran for one hundred and twenty pounds and had not since been wounded. Indeed, Death had avoided his face, and gone scurvily about killing brothers, sons and followers. The book was a Glasgow reproduction, costing eighteen pence; but Auda's deadliness did not let people laugh at his superstition.

== Technical advances ==
Bryce adopted contemporary advancements in photolithography, a process utilizing electroplates for photo reduction, to diminish larger volumes to exceptionally compact dimensions.

He maintained close affiliations with printing houses linked to the University of Glasgow and the University of Oxford, contributing to the clarity and legibility of the published texts.

His collaboration with Oxford University Press proved particularly advantageous, as the press had acquired the process for manufacturing ultra-thin opaque sheets known as "India paper" in 1875, facilitating the production of highly condensed textblocks.

== The Ellen Terry Shakespeare ==
David Bryce published several sets dedicated to Ellen Terry, an actress renowned for her portrayal of roles in Shakespeare plays and other classics during the Victorian and Edwardian eras. The most famous of these sets is a 40 volumes edition of Shakespeare's works, accompanied by a swivelling bookcase made of oak. The edition includes the plays, the sonnets, a biographical sketch and a glossary. It was published in 1904.

A 39-volume edition of the Ellen Terry Shakespeare is part of the miniature library of Queen Mary's Dolls' House.

== Published works ==
David Bryce and Son has published over 40 miniature books from the 1880's until the early 1910s. As most editions are undated, the exact years of publication are uncertain.

- A New Pocket-Dictionary of the English and German Languages (1896)
- Atlas of the world
- Chips from Dickens selected by Thomas Mason
- Diamond English Dictionary (1896)
- Elegy in a Country Churchyard and Other Poems, by Thomas Gray
- English Dictionary
- English Idyls and Other Poems, by Alfred Lord Tennyson
- Evangeline. A Tale of Arcadie, by Henry Wadsworth Longfellow
- Illustrated Miniature Bible
- In Memoriam, by Alfred Lord Tennyson
- Knowledge in a Nutshell
- Lady of the Lake, by Walter Scott
- Lays of Ancient Rome, by Thomas Macaulay
- Napoleon's Book of Fate (1905)
- Pearl Atlas of the World
- Poetical Works of Robert Burns
- Rubaiyat of Omar Khayyam
- Shakespeare’s Complete Works
- Story of Queen Mary
- Story of Rob Roy
- Story of Sir William Wallace
- The Book of Common Prayer
- The Finger Prayer Book
- The Holy Bible containing the Old and New Testaments (1896)
- The Illustrated Pocket Shakespeare
- The Lay of the Last Minstrel and Minor Poems, by Sir Walter Scott
- The Mite Koran
- The New Testament of our Lord and Saviour Jesus Christ (1895)
- The Pentland Rising, by Robert Louis Stevenson
- The Pocket Portrait Shakespeare
- The Qur'an
- The Smallest French and English Dictionary in the World (1896)
- The Story of Dumbarton Castle, by Henry Charles Shelley
- The Story of James Hogg, by J. Cuthbert Hadden

=== Midget Series ===
- Smallest English Dictionary
- Witty, Humorous, and Merry Thoughts
- Golden thoughts from great authors
- Old English, Scotch and Irish songs with music, by William Moodie
- French-English and Eng.-Fr. Dictionary
- Facsimile 1st Edition Burn's Poems, 1786
- The Koran
- New Testament
- German-English and Eng.-Ger. Dictionary
- English, French, German, and Italian Conversation Book
- Tiny Alphabet Book of Animals
- Tiny Alphabet Book of Birds

=== Finger Post Series ===
- A Kempis imitation of Christ
- Daily Food for Daily Life
- Wit and Humour - Prose
- Wit and Humour - Verse
- Ambulance Hints
- Old Scotch Songs, with Music
- More Old Scotch Songs, with Music

=== Thumb Series ===
- Thumb Autograph Book
- Thumb Birthday Book
- Thumb Book of Bible Promises
- Thumb Confession Book
- Thumb Diary and Proverb Book for Any Year
- Thumb English Dictionary
- Thumb Gazetteer of the World (1893)
- Thumb Ready Reckoner
