= The Smallest Books in the World =

Peruvian publishing house for mini books

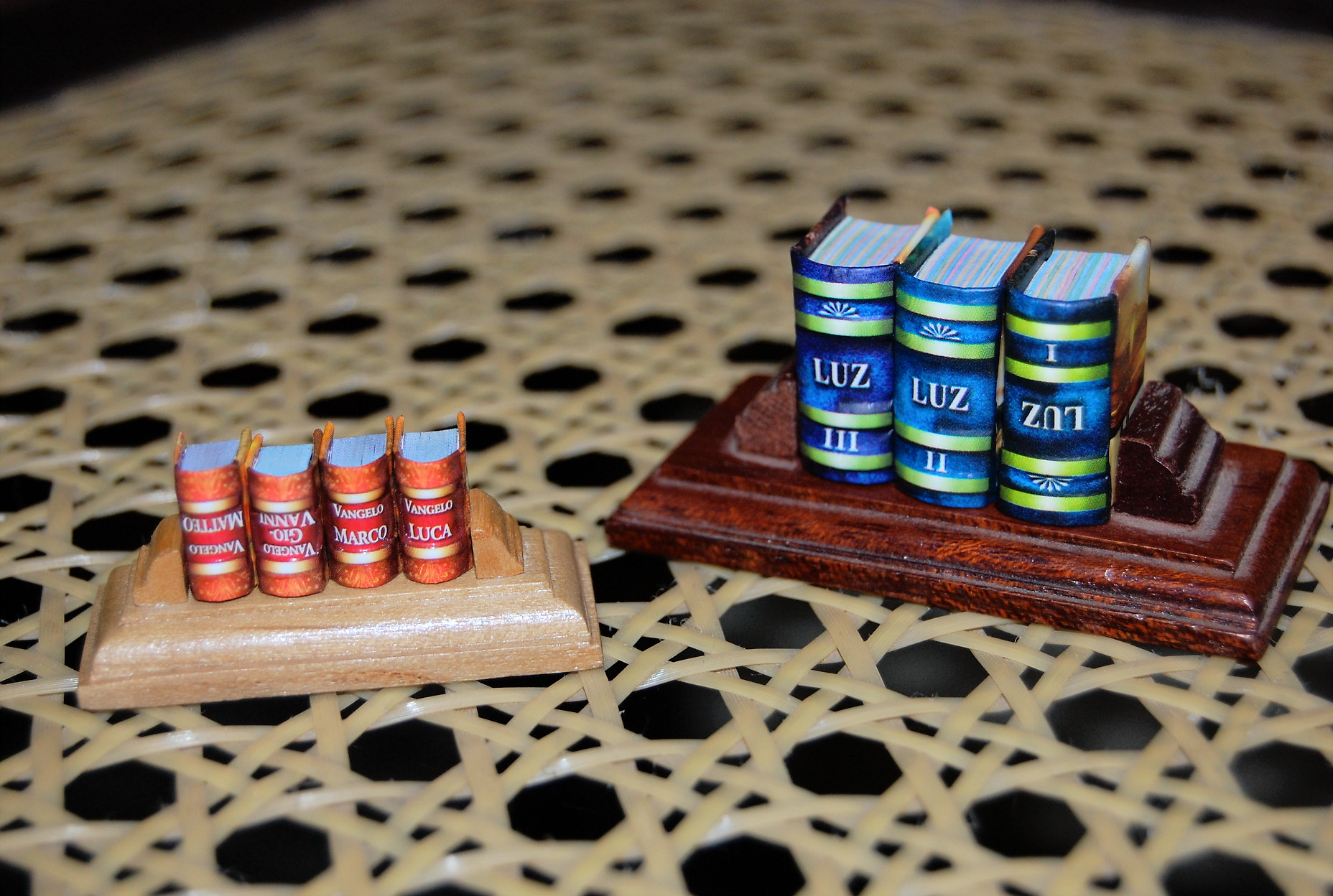
- Founded: 1970; 56 years ago
- Founder: Alberto Briceño
- Country of origin: Peru
- Headquarters location: Lima
- Publication types: Miniature books
- Official website: www.minibooks.com.pe

The Smallest Books in the World is a Latin American publishing house created in Peru by Alberto Briceño in 1970. Specialized in the handmade confection of mini books with dimensions of one square centimeter to the standardization of 5 x 6 x 2 centimeters. Initially it produced 120-page mini-books and then moved to books with 480 pages.

== Gallery ==
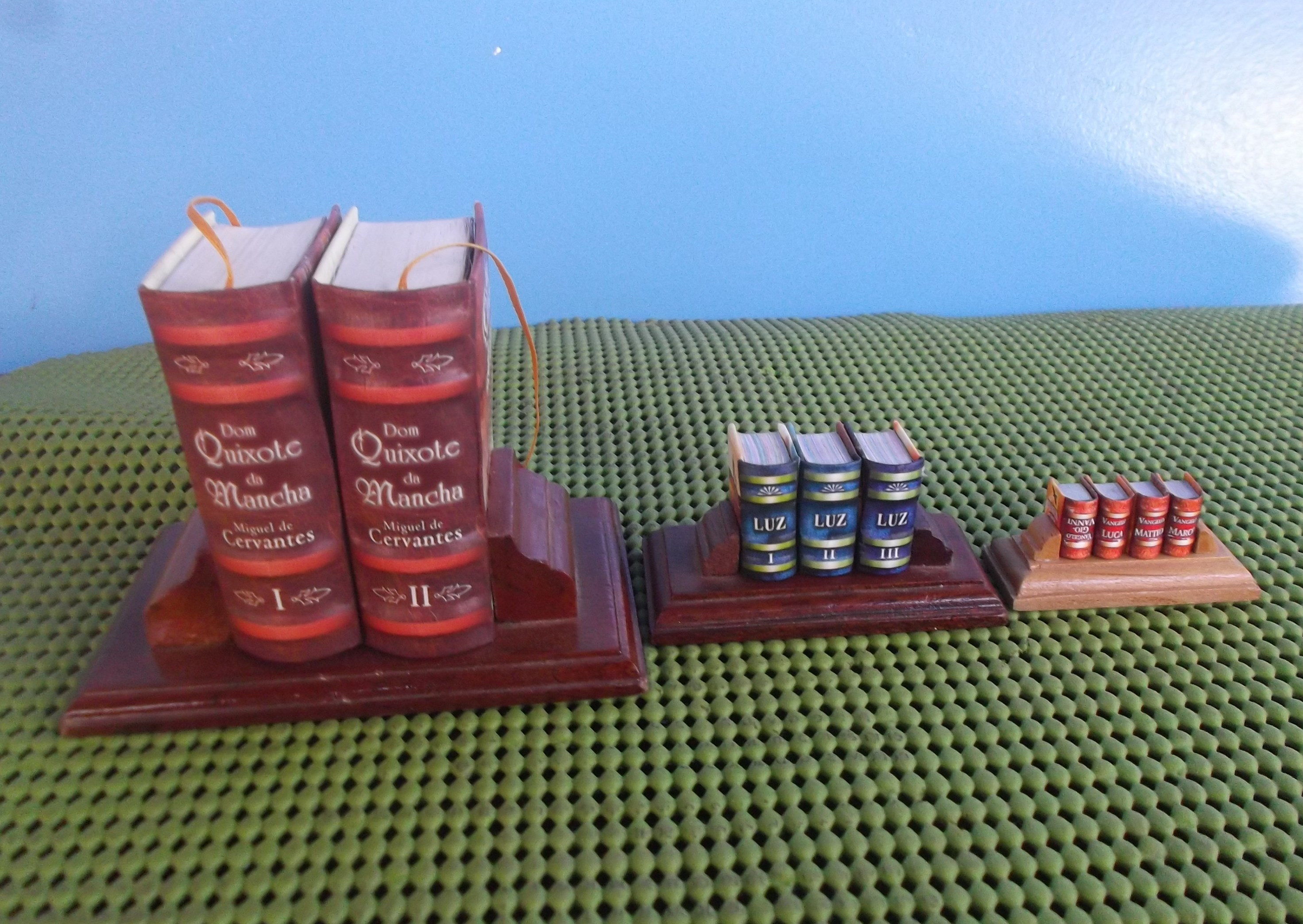
Miniatures

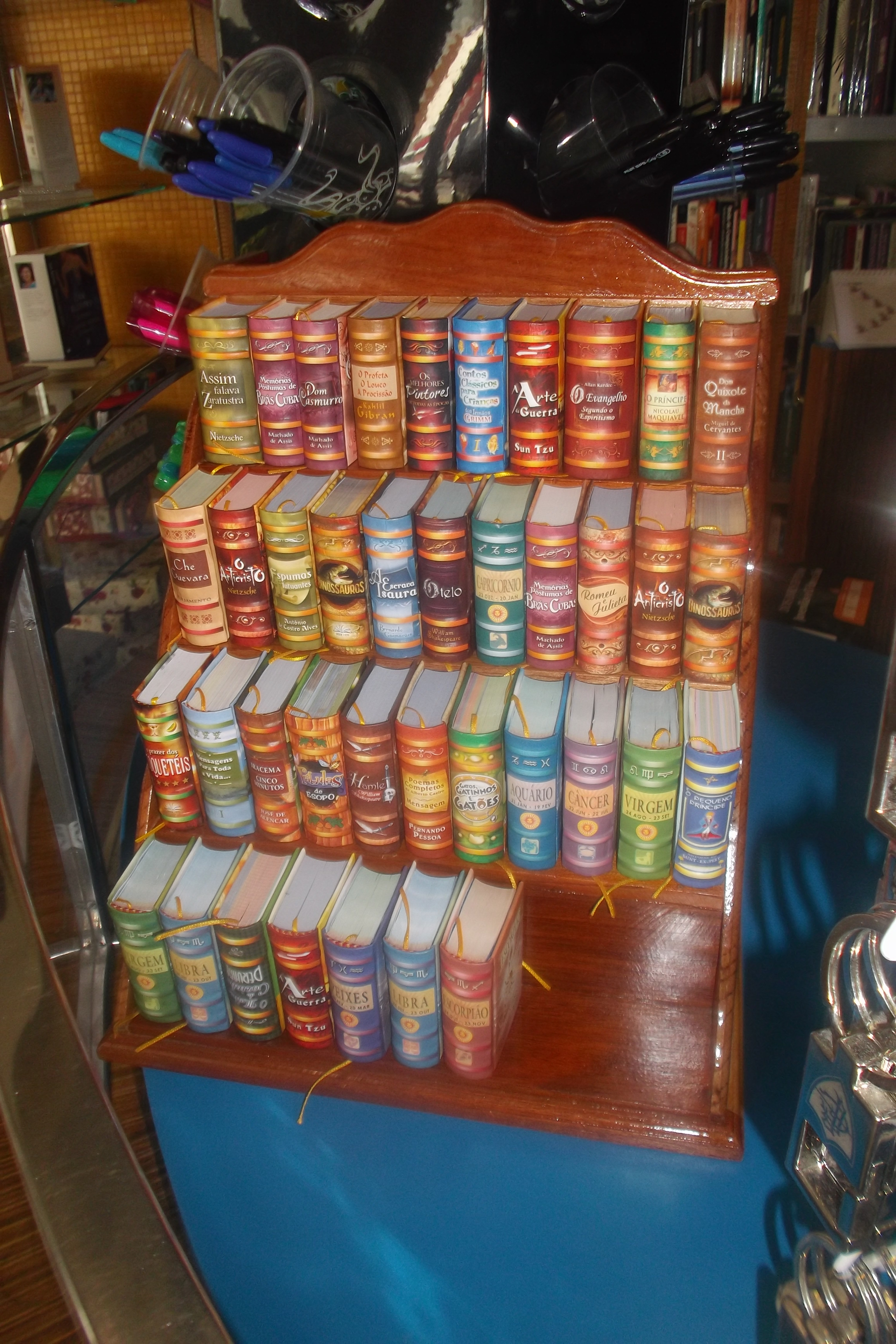
In exposition

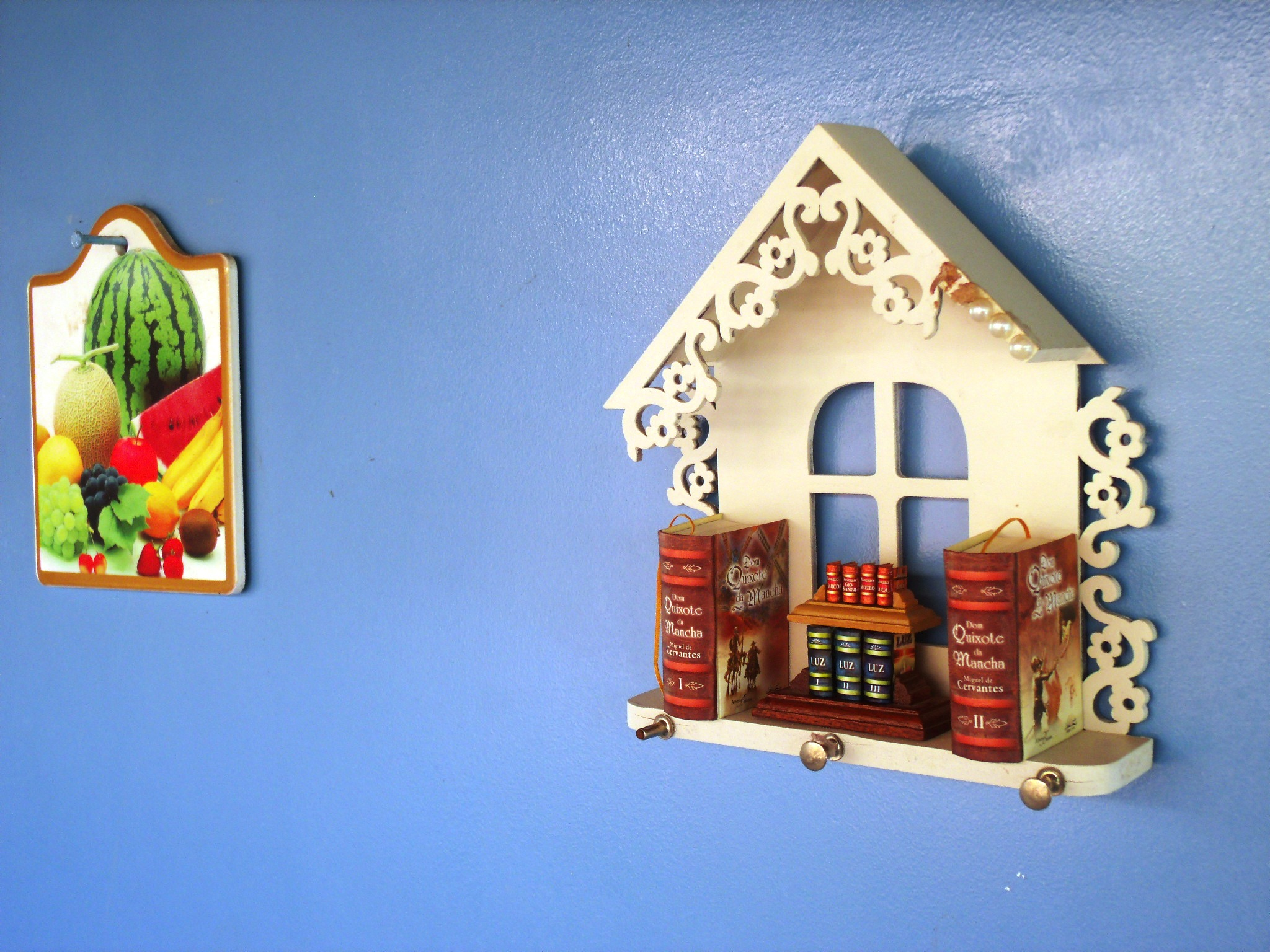
In decoration

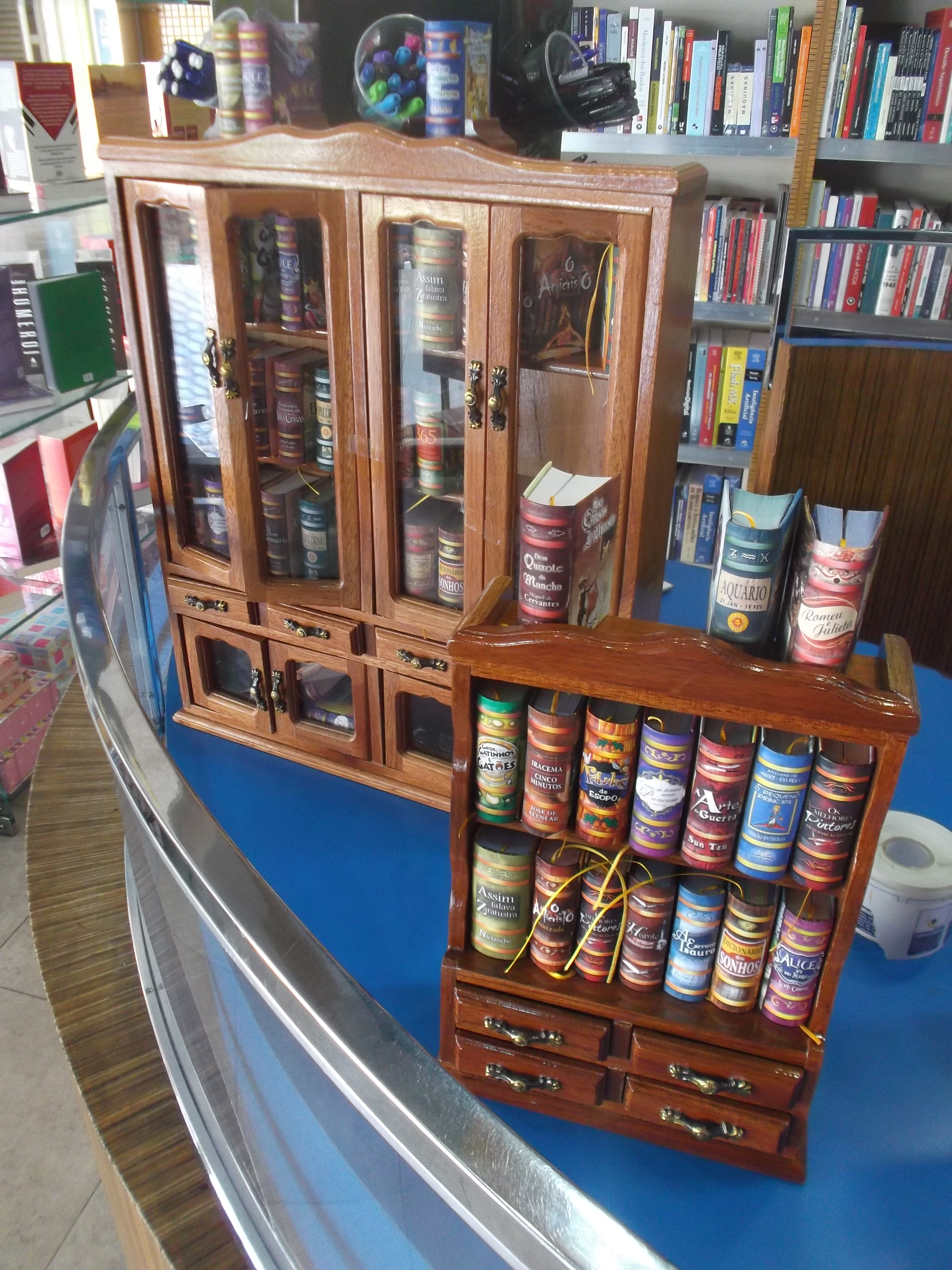
Mini libraries

== See also ==
- Miniature book
