= Aasiaat Museum =

Museum in Aasiaat, Qeqertalik, Greenland

- Aasiaat Katersugaasiviat
- Established: 3 December 1978 (original building); 2002 (current building)
- Location: Aasiaat, Qeqertalik, Greenland
- Coordinates: 68°42′30.5″N 52°52′15.2″W
- Type: museum
- Website: Official website

The Aasiaat Museum (Greenlandic: Aasiaat Katersugaasiviat) is a museum in Aasiaat, Qeqertalik Municipality, Greenland, based in the former colonial administrator's residence. The museum's displays are based on the cultural history of Aasiaat, and a variety of special art exhibitions.

== History ==
The establishment of the museum started in late 1960s when there were some discussions on transforming the house of former whaling captain, the oldest building in Aasiaat, into a museum. Delays meant that this building would not be complete before 1982, so it was agreed to use politician Frederik Lynge's house instead.

In April 1977, the museum committee was formed. The museum was finally opened on 3 December 1978 at location B-404, Lynge's former home, built in 1932. In summer 1986, a museum curator was hired and the museum became eligible to receive funding from the Naalakkersuisut. In 1998, the museum also built a traditional sod house (B-1360) in which they hold further exhibitions.

In 2002, the museum moved to its current location at B-124, former home of the colonial administrator of the area, built in 1860 and expanded in the 1920s. Both B-404 and B-124 are listed buildings.

== Exhibitions ==
The museum has a section of permanent exhibitions, as well as temporary contemporary art exhibitions, and travelling exhibitions. The permanent exhibitions show historical artifacts from Greenland, chronicling the lives of the Thule people and Inuit culture, containing a number of items from the Disko Island area.

The exhibitions include:

- Inuit hunting tools
- Two umiaqs, one made with sealskin and the other with canvas
- A Greenlandic dog sled
- Traditional costumes, showing men's and women's costumes

== See also ==
- List of museums in Greenland
