= Nordic Bible Museum =

Bible museum in Oslo, Norway

- Nordisk bibelmuseum
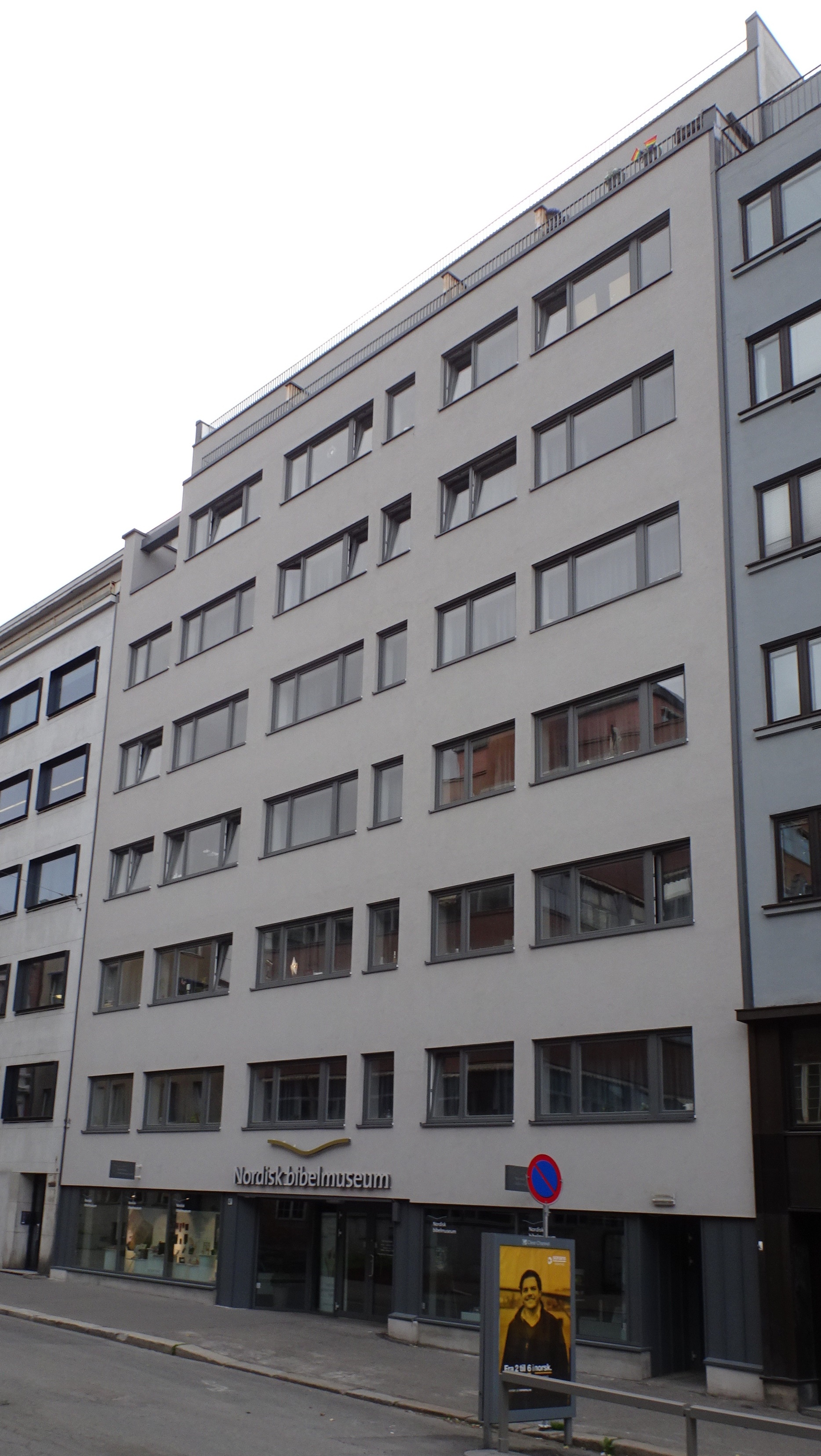
- Nordic Bible Museum at Nedre Slottsgate 4C, Oslo.
- Established: 31 May 2018
- Location: Oslo, Norway
- Coordinates: 59.9103°N 10.7410°E
- Type: Bible museum
- Collection size: Over 5,000 as of 2021
- Website: nobimu.no/en/home/

The Nordic Bible Museum (Norwegian: Nordisk bibelmuseum) (Nobimu), located in Oslo, Norway, is the first Bible museum in the Nordic countries.

== History and organization ==
The museum was started by Rune Arnhoff, a Bible collector holding the largest collection of Bibles in the Nordic countries.The collection has been built up over many years and grew significantly in 2016 when Arnhoff purchased a collection of 1,600 Bibles that had until then been loaned out by shipowner Jan Olaf Tønnevold to the Norwegian Bible Society. Nobimu is a foundation with its own board, and its purpose is to make the content of the Bible accessible and known. Around 40 volunteers handle the daily operations of the museum. At the opening, there were approximately 2,500 Bibles in the collection, and through donations and purchases, it has grown to over 6,000 Bibles.

The Nordic Bible Museum was inaugurated on 31 May 2018 by Member of Parliament Kristin Ørmen Johnsen.

Nobimu is located at Nedre Slottsgate 4C in Oslo's city center.

== Exhibitions ==
The exhibition at the museum holds the largest collection in the Nordic countries, with over 6,000 bibles as of 2021 and contains a varied selection of Nordic and non-Nordic Bibles. Some of the rarest are an edition of the Gustav Vasa Bible from 1541, the Christian III Bible from 1550 (the Reformation Bible), an original page from the Gutenberg Bible (the only one on display in Norway), a Latin Bible (Vulgate) from 1487, the first Sámi-language Bible published in 1811, an edition of the first Finnish Bible translation printed in Finland in 1685 and parchment manuscripts from approximately 1250.

There are also themed exhibitions on the King James Version – the most printed Bible – and a collection of miniature Bibles, the world's smallest printed Bible among them.

During the COVID-19 pandemic, the museum began working on digital exhibitions: parts of the collection were digitized so that visitors could view it from home. The museum also holds webinars on the history of the Bible. The Nordic region's first fully digital VR museum opened on May 3, which resulted in a nomination for the Best Art & Culture award at the VRINN Awards 2022

In November 2022, Nobimu launched a collection of three-dimensional NFT Bibles, likely making them the first in the world to offer such digital Bibles
