= Anatoly Konenko =

Russian painter

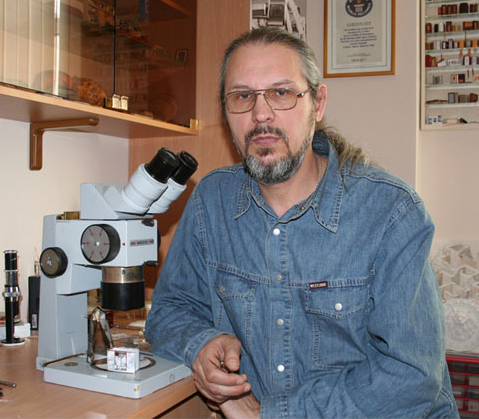
- Born: Anatoly Ivanovich Konenko; 23 February 1954; Orsk of Soviet Union
- Known for: Painting
- Notable work: Shod flea
- Movement: Microminiature

Anatoly Ivanovich Konenko (Russian: Анато́лий Ива́нович Коне́нко; born 23 February 1954) is a microminiature painter and sculptor from the Russian city of Omsk. In 1996 he was entered into the Guinness Book of World Records for creating the world's smallest book.

== Life ==
Konenko was born in the town of Orsk in the Orenburg region of Russia. His family later relocated to Kazakhstan. Konenko received a degree in technical architecture from The Omsk College of Civil Engineering. In 1982 he graduated from Omsk State Pedagogical University with a degree in graphic design. He has worked as a designer of eye-surgery instruments.

== Microminiatures ==
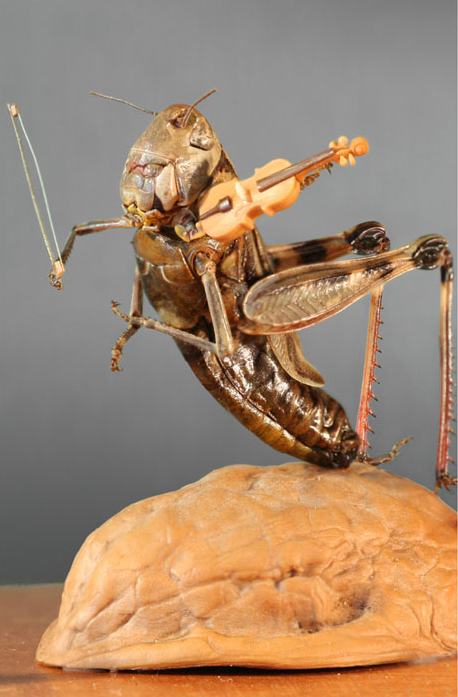
Grasshopper playing the violin.

Konenko began to create miniature works in 1981. Konenko's works often reference Russian fables and fairy tales; some of his most famous creations include "The Savvy Flea", "The Grasshopper Violinist" and "A Caravan of Camels in the Eye of the Needle". Since 2007, his son has worked with him.

Konenko works in a variety of media, using human hair, poppy seeds, and rice as surfaces. Some of his works include living animals. In 2011, he created a miniature aquarium to house a living tiny fish, complete with a net. It contained just two teaspoons of water, two fish, and some algae. He can shoe a flea.

== Miniature books ==
Konenko has published more than 200 miniature books. His edition of Chekhov's Chameleon, issued in 1996 in Omsk, is printed on paper and includes 30 pages, 3 color illustrations, and a portrait of Chekhov, and measures 0,9 x 0,9 mm. It was published in an edition of 100 and is bound in gold, silver, and leather. Anatoly Konenko has been listed in Guinness Book of Records for creating the book. In 2010 Konenko issued a collection of miniature book volumes of Pushkin, Koltsov, Evtushenko.

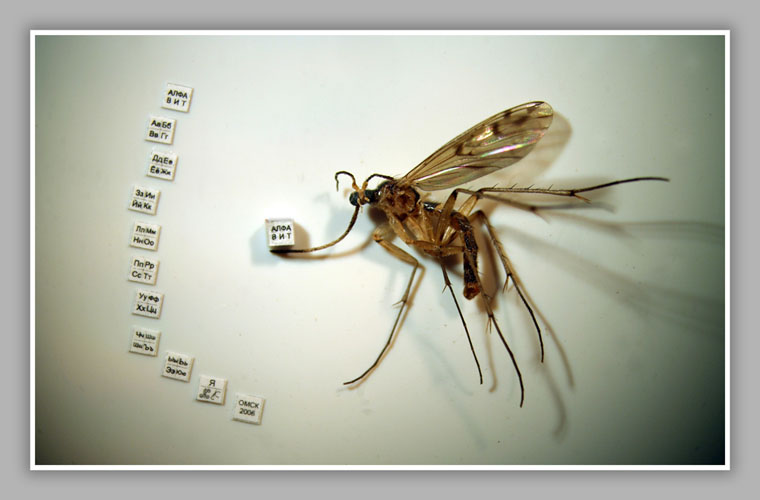
Supermicrobook. Size 0,8 x 0,8 mm.
