= Sarah Bodman =

British book artist and scholar

Sarah Bodman is a British artist and scholar known for her work with artist's books.

== Education ==
Bodman has the following degrees: Doctor of Philosophy UWE, Bristol, 2018; Master's of Philosophy, UWE, Bristol, 1995; BA in Fine Arts with honors, Falmouth School of Art, 1991.

== Career ==
Bodman is a professor at University of the West England, Bristol where she is Artists’ Books / Programme Leader MA Multidisciplinary Printmaking Centre for Print Research.

Bodman is the editor of Artist’s Book Yearbook, Book Arts Newsletter, and The Blue Notebook journal. She is also a researcher at WITTA (Writing In / To / Through Art).

Bodman has published extensively on the subject of book arts. Her artist's books are held in various public collections and have been funded in several anthropologies

Bodman was one of the initial hosts for the books arts and bookmark aspects of the al Mutanabbi Street project.

== Reception ==
Bodman's work as a book artist is widely recognized and well received. Curator Eileen Wallace writes, "At once startling and captivating, the work of Sarah Bodman features subject matter that at first glance seems innocuous. . . She excels at synthesizing historical and contemporary texts with traditional and modern bookmaking techniques, creating distinctly identifiable work that prompts readers to think about subject from various angles."

Bodman's books are featured in Masters Book Arts: major works by leading artists, curated by Eileen Wallace, ‘turn the page’ anthology, edited by Jules Allen, and 1000 Artists’ Books: Exploring the Book as Art, Sandra Salamoney with Peter & Donna Thomas.

== Publications ==
- Artists’ Books Creative Production and Marketing, Impact Press UWE Bristol, 3rd edition 2010, ISBN 978-1-906501-05-1
- Creating Artists’ Books A & C Black, London, December 2007, ISBN 978-0-7136-6509-3
- A Manifesto for the Book, co-authored with Tom Sowden, 2010, ISBN 978-1-906501-04-4
- Editor: Artist's Book Yearbook 2024-2025, Impact Press, UWE Bristol, Jan 2024, ISBN 978-1-906501-22-8
- Editor: Artist's Book Yearbook 2022-2023, Impact Press, UWE Bristol, Jan 2022, ISBN 978-1-906501-22-8
- Editor: The Blue Notebook: journal for artists’ books, 64pp, biannual, Impact Press, est. October 2006, ISSN 1751-1712
- Editor: Book Arts Newsletter, 4-6 weekly, edited newsletter, Impact Press, est. 2002, ISSN 1754-9086
- Artists’ books news column for ARLIS UK and Ireland news-sheet (2006 - 2015)
- ARLISmatters (2016 – 2018)
- Artists’ Books series for a-n (2015- 2019)
- ‘Imagined Worlds Abound’, in turn the page anthology - publication Feb 2024
- Book Review: ‘Women in Print I and Women in Print 2’, Journal of the Printing Historical Society, Third Series, Number 4, December 2023, ISSN 0079-5321, pp 339–340
- ‘Pandora’s Hieroglyphic Primer’, in RE:Making - A Documentation of Work by Angela Lorenz, edited by Judith Tolnick Champa with Jae Jennifer Rossman, the jenny-press, New Haven, CT, USA, ISBN 978-0-578-26961-0, August 2023, pp152, 173
- ‘Emanation for the Fox Sisters' for - Field Report, Journal of Field Study International, report on activities 2022, editor David Dellafiora, May 2023
- KART 125, David Dellafiora - curator, published by genU & Field Study International, Australia, April 2023
- KART 122, David Dellafiora - curator, published by genU & Field Study International, Australia, October 2022
- ‘Write here’ for - Field Report, Journal of Field Study International, report on activities 2021, editor David Dellafiora, June 2022
- Postcards for Perec, Compiled and edited by Linda Parr, Impact Press, Bristol, February 2022, ISBN 978-1-906501-21-1, pp 17, 23, 26, 30, 34, 40, 42, 45, 55, 60
- ‘Why Publish?’ for - Field Report 2020, Journal of Field Study International, report on activities 2020, editor David Dellafiora, June 2021
- ‘Spending time within books’ in Refresh the Book: On the Hybrid Nature of the Book in the Age of Electronic Publishing. Editors: K. Bazarnik, V. Hildebrand-Schat & C. B Schulz. Koninklijke Brill NV, the Netherlands, ISBN 978-90-04-44084-5, April 2021, pp 221–245
- Artwork featured in Right here, right now - Observations, Speculations & Hallucinations, edited by Danny Aldred, Book-Lab, ISBN 978-1-716-80539-4, September 2020, pp138–139
- ‘Susan Hiller’ for Salon for a Speculative Future, edited by Monika Oechsler with Sharon Kivland, Ma Bibliothèque, ISBN 978-1-910055-72-4, June 2020, pp28–29
- ‘On reading the ongoing, environmentally-focused works encompassing Termómetos Project from Mexican artist Ireri Topete’, Printmaking Today, Vol 32, Issue 127, Autumn 2023, pp22–23
- 'WORLD BOOK NIGHT UNITED ARTISTS, Stories of and strategies for experimental, collaborative publishing', Axon: Creative Explorations, Vol 13 No 1, Text | Page | Art, July 2023, pp2–21
- 'Depths of fields - Chrystal Cherniwchan & Craig Tattersall's print and sound collaborations', Printmaking Today, Vol 32, Issue 126, Summer 2023, pp22–23
- 'In Search of Symmetry: Sarah Bodman speaks with artist Tricia Treacy as she prepares for an exhibition of her new work Scaffolding at the Center for Book Arts, New York', Printmaking Today, Vol 31, Issue 125, Spring 2023, pp22–23
- 'Worlds within Words - the hand printed chapbooks of Graeme Hobbs', Printmaking Today, Vol 31, Issue 124, Winter 2022, pp22–23
- 'Connecting the Dots: Sarah Bodman links collaborative book projects by Mary V Marsh with her own printed poem created long distance during the pandemic', Printmaking Today, Vol 31, Issue 123, Autumn 2022, pp22–23
- 'Two Sides to Every Story - letterpress printed bookworks by Andrew Morrison', Printmaking Today, Vol 31, Issue 122, Summer 2022, pp22–23
- ‘Looking into the Light: Randi Annie Strand’s light-refracting series Prism and the reading of her books as performance’, Printmaking Today, Vol 31, Issue 121, Spring 2022, pp22–23
- ‘25 and counting: San Francisco Center for the Book celebrates its past and future in artists’ books’, Printmaking Today, Vol 30, Issue 120, Winter 2021, pp22–23
- ‘Past and Future Tense, The Faded Future Archive by Ioannis Anastasiou and Majka Dokudowicz’, Printmaking Today, Vol 30, Issue 119, Autumn 2021, pp22–23
- ‘His Dark Materials, artists’ books by Ian Andrews exploring Dark Matter’, Printmaking Today, Vol 30, Issue 118, Summer 2021, pp22–23
- ‘Nature Trails, botanical bookworks by Radha Pandey’, Printmaking Today, Vol 30, Issue 117, Spring 2021, pp22–23

== Bibliography ==
- ‘turn the page’ anthology, edited by Jules Allen
- 1000 Artists’ Books: Exploring the Book as Art, Sandra Salamoney with Peter & Donna Thomas, Quarry Books, Beverly, MA, USA
- Masters Book Arts: major works by leading artists, curated by Eileen Wallace, Lark Books, New York.

== Collections ==
- Tate Britain
- the British Library
- the V & A Museum
- All Saints Library and Winchester School of Art, UK
- Joan Flasch Artist's Book Collection, Yale Center for British Art
- MoMA New York
- Brooklyn Museum of Art
- Mills College
- Rhode Island School of Design, USA
- Jack Ginsberg collection, Johannesburg, South Africa
- Rikhardinkatu Library, Helsinki, Finland
- Artists’ Books Archive, Milan
- Bibliotheca Alexandria, Egypt
- Moscow Artist's Book Archive
- KKV Grafik Artist's Book Arkiv, Sweden
- The Art Gallery of New South Wales, Sydney
- Institute of the Arts, Canberra, Australia

== Solo exhibitions ==
- Sarah Bodman - I Made This For You, 15th AMACI - Giornata del Contemporaneo. Curated by Antonio Freiles, Galleria d’Arte Moderna e Contemporanea L. Barbera, Messina, Italy, 12/10/2019 - 15/11/2019. Publication: Lago Cremisi Permanente, 2019
- Read To Me - A psychometric collaboration with objects. Visual Studies Workshop, Rochester, NY, USA, 09/09/18 - 27/10/18
  - Winchester School of Art, UK 15/11/18 - 20/12/18
  - Collins Memorial Library, Puget Sound USA, 12/03/19–12/05/19
  - Bower Ashton Library, UWE Bristol (The Story of 'Read to Me' exhibition) 01/07/19 - 31/08/19
  - John M. Flaxman Library, School of the Art Institute of Chicago, 26/08/19 - 27/09/19
- Lady Vengeance - Artists’ Books by Sarah Bodman, 23 Sandy Gallery, Portland, Oregon, USA March 6–28, 2009
- Lady Vengeance - Artists’ Books by Sarah Bodman at the Collins Memorial Library, University of Puget Sound, Tacoma, Washington, USA. 4 May - 1 June 2009

== Awards ==
- The Marsh Test artist's book publishing award, Visual Studies Workshop, Rochester, New York, 2002
