= Peter and Donna Thomas =

American book artists

Donna and Peter Thomas
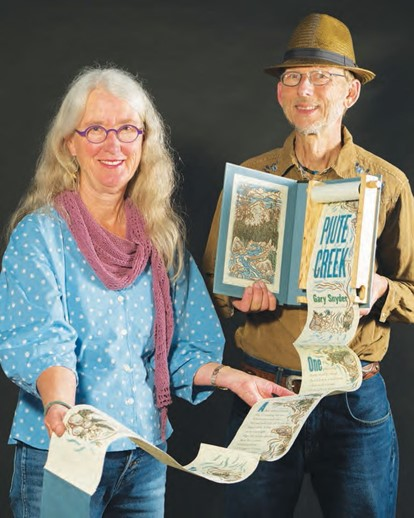
- Donna and Peter and Donna Thomas holding Gary Snyder’s Piute Creek [A160], 2019. Photography by Greg Graalfs.
- Known for: Papermakers, Book Artists, Authors, Educators
- Awards: Norman Forgue Award, Distinguished Book Award, Judges Distinction for Innovation in the Helen DeGolyer Triennial for American Bookbinding

Peter and Donna Thomas are American papermakers, book artists, and authors. They travel across the United States in their self-constructed gypsy wagon, educating others about the book arts and teaching workshops in communities throughout the country. They are co-authors of three commercially published books and have created over 100 limited edition, handcrafted books. Their work has been shown at universities, libraries, galleries, and museums around the world.

== Early lives ==
Peter R. Thomas was born January 5, 1954, in Los Angeles, California, United States. He studied the book arts with William Everson at Lime Kiln Press and graduated from University of California, Santa Cruz with a BA degree in Aesthetic Studies in 1978. Donna (Millar) Thomas was born March 31, 1957, in San Francisco, California. She graduated from the School of Expressive Arts at Sonoma State University in 1979.

Peter and Donna met in the fall of 1973. Peter was on a gap year from college and staying with family friends who were Donna’s neighbors. At the time Peter was working as an actor at the Renaissance Pleasure Faire in Novato, California, where he hoped to participate as an artisan. It was then that he made his first handbound book and his first sheets of handmade paper. He started showing his work at the Faire in the spring of 1974, and taught visitors how to make both paper and books by hand. Donna partnered with Peter at the Faire in the fall of 1975. She taught papermaking and bound books with him. The two formed a business arrangement in 1977.

Peter and Donna married in 1979 and have two daughters, Tanya and Suzanne, born in 1983 and 1984, respectively.

== Career ==
From 1974 to 1989 Peter and Donna Thomas made and sold books and paper at the Living History Center's Renaissance Pleasure Faire of Southern California. In 1977 Peter and Donna Thomas established a private press in 1976 and have worked individually and collaboratively on creating books, making paper, letterpress printing and book binding. Their books have been shown in the United States and abroad and purchased for collections. In 1977 Peter and Donna Thomas founded the Good Book Press and in 1978 they printed their first book. It was their aim to create books in the tradition of the great private presses: limited editions, made of the finest materials and produced to the highest standards of quality. They spent the next ten years producing "fine press" books in both full size and miniature format, making the paper, printing, and binding the books themselves.

In the late 1980s Peter and Donna began working in new formats made possible by access to personal computer technology, exploring non-traditional book structures and shaped book objects, as both limited editions and one-of-a-kind books. In 1988 they reorganized under the imprint Peter and Donna Thomas: Santa Cruz. In 1992 they printed Good Books, a bibliography of their work, listing over fifty titles representing many authors and a wide range of subjects. They lectured and taught workshops internationally and published articles on papermaking and other aspects of the book arts.

Beginning in the 1990s, they focused their energy on documenting the history and techniques of hand papermaking as a contribution to the renaissance of the craft—through lectures, video productions about the ergonomics and techniques of traditional vat mill hand papermakers in Europe and a traveling exhibition based around A Collection of Paper Samples Handmade in the USA (1993). This book features individual papermakers’ statements about the papers they make, each printed letterpress on a sample of that person's paper. Paper from Plants followed in 1999.

They co-authored More Making Books by Hand (2004), The Muir Ramble Route (2010), and 1000 Artists' Books (2012).

In 2005 the Thomases published The History of Papermaking in the Philippines. It began with Peter attending a one-day papermaking workshop in Santa Cruz, California taught by Nida Dumsang from the Philippines. Upon learning that there was no written history of papermaking in the Philippines, the idea of writing the first history of Filipino papermaking was born. He first visited the Philippines in February 1990 and gathered information over the following ten years. The book includes discussions of the pre-historic precursors to paper, including Philippine bark cloth. It contains a survey of the first printed books made in the Philippines and the paper they were printed on. It ends with a chronological history of both commercial and hand paper making in the Philippines up to 2000.

In 2012 they placed their collection of books and other materials on the subject of papermaking in the library at the University of Iowa.

== The Good Book Press ==
The Good Book Press was a fine press book publisher, founded in 1977 by Peter and Donna Thomas. The proprietors produced the books by hand. Peter Thomas (aka Peter Papermaker) made the paper and Donna Thomas illustrated the books predominantly with linoleum cuts. The Thomases handset the type, letterpress printed the books, and bound the books by hand. Many of their works were sold at the California Renaissance Fair.

The Good Book Press specialized in miniature books, often fairy tales or fables. Many were original texts by Peter Thomas. The Good Book Press's final work was their 1987 edition of poet William Everson’s eulogy for the death of Robinson Jeffers, titled “The Poet is Dead.”

The introduction of personal computers revolutionized production of fine press books. Artists from different mediums began to explore the books as art. In 1988, declaring that they were no longer publishers, but rather artists working in the medium of the book, Peter and Donna dropped the Good Book Press imprint and began creating their books under their new imprint: Peter and Donna Thomas: Santa Cruz.

== Conceptual artwork ==
In 2009 Peter and Donna Thomas began a conceptual art project. They created a traveling artists’ book that was structurally based on a British Reading "gypsy" wagon or vardo, and functioned as a home, a physical artwork and as a metaphoric embodiment of their ideas about the changing nature of the physical book in the digital age.

In 2010–2013, the Thomases took their sculptural artists' book on two cross country trips. As “Wandering Book Artists” they presented their traveling artists' book to both academic and community based audiences. While traveling, Peter Thomas began to theorize a typology for all physical artists' books. He classified all physical artists' books by structure, dividing them into four distinct categories: codex, folded, single-sheet, sculptural. Within this typology, the wagon was a sculptural artists’ book that contained the other three book types.

Their work has been exhibited and collected at universities, libraries, galleries, and museums throughout the world, including National Museum of Women in the Arts, New York Public Library, Scripps College, University of Virginia, Smith College, Yale University, Rutgers University, University of California, San Diego, University of California, Santa Cruz, University of Arizona, University of Wisconsin, San Francisco Center for the Book, Victoria and Albert Museum, University of Pennsylvania, Brown University, Columbia University, Harvard University, Art Institute of Chicago, The Huntington Library, J. Paul Getty Museum, and Koninklijke Bibliotheek.

== Education and advocacy ==
In 2004 Quarry Books published their More Making Books by Hand, providing instructions for constructing 12 different binding structures pioneered or developed by the Thomases developed. In 2010 Poetic Matrix Press published their Muir Ramble Route, a guide book for walking from San Francisco, California to Yosemite National Park following the route of John Muir's first trip to Yosemite taken in 1868. In 2012 Quarry published their 1,000 Artists' Books: Exploring the Book as Art, which they co-authored with Sandra Solomay, grouping the images into the four structural categories Peter had earlier defined.

== Awards and recognition ==
In 1997 their binding was given special mention for innovative design in the Helen DeGolyer Triennial Exhibition. A Collection of Paper Samples Handmade in the USA was featured by the Guild of Bookworkers as the set book for a national traveling show titled Paper Bound during 1997–1998. In 1997 the Miniature Book Society presented them with the Norman Forgue Award for promoting miniature books. In 1998 and 1999, one of their books was chosen for the Distinguished Book Award. In 2001 their binding of James Joyce's Ulysses was awarded the Judges Distinction for Innovation in the Helen DeGolyer Triennial for American Bookbinding. In 2001, the Santa Cruz Museum of Art and History featured their work in a show titled "Art Undercover," and in 2010 in a show titled "It’s in the Pulp: The Art of Papermaking in Santa Cruz".

== Bibliography ==
- The History of Papermaking in the Philippines 1576-1999 (2005)
- More Making Books By Hand: Exploring Miniature Books, Alternative Structures, and Found Objects (2004)
- The Muir Ramble Route (2010)
- 1,000 Artists' Books: Exploring the Book as Art (2012)
- Hetch Hetchy Flora - a collection of wildflowers painted on May 22, 2013. (2013)
