= Creative Future (British organisation) =

British charitable organisation supporting emerging writers

Creative Future is a British charitable organisation that supports artists and writers from Underrepresented groups in the community. It is chiefly known for its annual Creative Future Writers' Awards (CFWA).

== History ==
Creative Future was founded in 2007.

== Description ==
The organisation is a British charitable organisation based in Brighton, West Sussex.

It aims to counter inequality by providing support to people whose access to the arts is hindered by poor mental health, disability, socioeconomic background, gender identity, as members of racial minorities that experience inequity, and others who have been historically underrepresented in the arts.

== Creative Future Writers' Award ==
The Creative Future Writers' Awards (CFWA), established in 2013, is a programme to celebrate and help to develop the talents of unpublished and underrepresented writers. The programme is not only the only free-to-enter national writing competition for all eligible writers writers in the UK, but also includes workshops held online and around the country. Professional development for winners includes writing courses, literary memberships, manuscript assessments, and coaching.

Each year Creative Future awards the Creative Future Writers' Award. Award winners receive £20,000 in cash and various writing development prizes from literary partners, along with long-term support. Their work is also published in an anthology published on the day of the ceremony.

The awards ceremony is usually held as part of London Literature Festival at the Southbank Centre.

As of 2024, the categories for the awards were Creative Non-Fiction, Fiction, and Poetry, and 12 winners in each were awarded with Platinum, Gold, Silver, and Bronze awards. One writer in each category was Highly Commended. In 2024, there was an increase of 19% in the number of entries compared to 2023, and a 53% increase on five years earlier. Prize partners included the Faber Academy, Poetry School, Curtis Brown Creative, and The Literary Consultancy.

In 2025, the number of winners has increased to 15.

=== Past events ===
In 2021, the cash award was worth £10,000, awarded to each of 12 winners, selected from over 1,200 entries. Novelist Dorothy Koomson was chief judge of the awards.

In 2024, the theme of the award was "Reveal". Judges were New Zealand poet Nina Mingya Powles, British poet and editor Wayne Holloway-Smith, and others appointed by various prize partners.

In 2025, the event will be held on 25 October. Poet Nancy Campbell, Nigerian British writer Irenosen Okojie, and London-based journalist Kieran Yates are the judges for the award. The theme is "Wild".

=== Past winners ===
Past winners have included:

- 2017: Romalyn Ante, Platinum award for poetry
- 2021: Tom Newlands, Next Up Award
