= Ilulissat Art Museum =

Museum in Ilulissat, Avannaata, Greenland

- Ilulissat Kunstmuseum
- Established: 1995
- Location: Ilulissat, Avannaata, Greenland
- Coordinates: 69°13′11.2″N 51°05′42.5″W
- Type: art museum
- Architect: Boysen Møller

The Ilulissat Art Museum (Danish: Ilulissat Kunstmuseum) is an art museum in Ilulissat, Avannaata Municipality, Greenland.

== History ==
The museum building was originally built in 1923 by architect Helge Møller. It served as the residence of the colony manager; 5 colony managers and 5 commercial principals have lived in the house. Later on, the house was acquired by the municipal colony and turned into the museum which was opened in 1995.

== Exhibitions ==
The ground floor exhibits permanent exhibitions with about 50 paintings by Emanuel A. Petersen. The upper floor exhibits contemporary exhibitions by different visual artists. The museum also hosts an artist in residence program.

== See also ==
- List of museums in Greenland
