= Thumb Bible =

Miniature version of the Bible

A Thumb Bible is a type of miniature book. A usually paraphrased or abridged version of the Bible, it is a devotional volume whose name refers to its size. Many thumb Bibles were intended for children and were decorated with pictures. The first Thumb Bibles were published in the early seventeenth century, with several hundred different editions being printed in subsequent centuries.

== History ==
The first known Thumb Bible was written by John Weever in verse form. Entitled An Agnus Dei, it appeared in London in 1601. It measured 3.3 by 2.7 cm (1.3 by 1.1 in) and contained 128 pages of six lines. In 1614, John Taylor published his Verbum Sempiternum, which also summarised the Bible in verse form. These were designed to provide instruction to children who were not old enough to read the Bible itself. The first Thumb Bible in prose was published in London in 1727, under the title Biblia or a Practical Summary of ye Old & New Testaments. This contained 300 pages and measured 3.6 by 2.4 cm (1.4 by 0.9 in).

In 1780 Elizabeth Newbery who specialised in books for children printed a thumb bible. The bible had 256 pages that abridged both the old and new testaments.

The term 'Thumb Bible' was first coined by Longman and Co. of London in the mid-nineteenth century, when they used it on the title page of an edition in 1849. Thumb Bibles continued to be printed in the eighteenth and nineteenth centuries. Approximately 300 different editions survive. As well as being published in English, versions were printed in French, German and Dutch.

== Notable Thumb Bibles ==
- An Agnus Dei (John Weever, 1601)
- Verbum Sempiternum (John Taylor, 1614)
- Novum Testamentum Graecum (Jean Jannon, 1628/1629)
- Biblia or a Practical Summary of ye Old & New Testaments (1727)
- The Bible in Miniature, or a Concise History of the Old and New Testaments (1780)
- Bible du Petit Poucet (1800)
