= Upernavik Museum =

Museum in Greenland

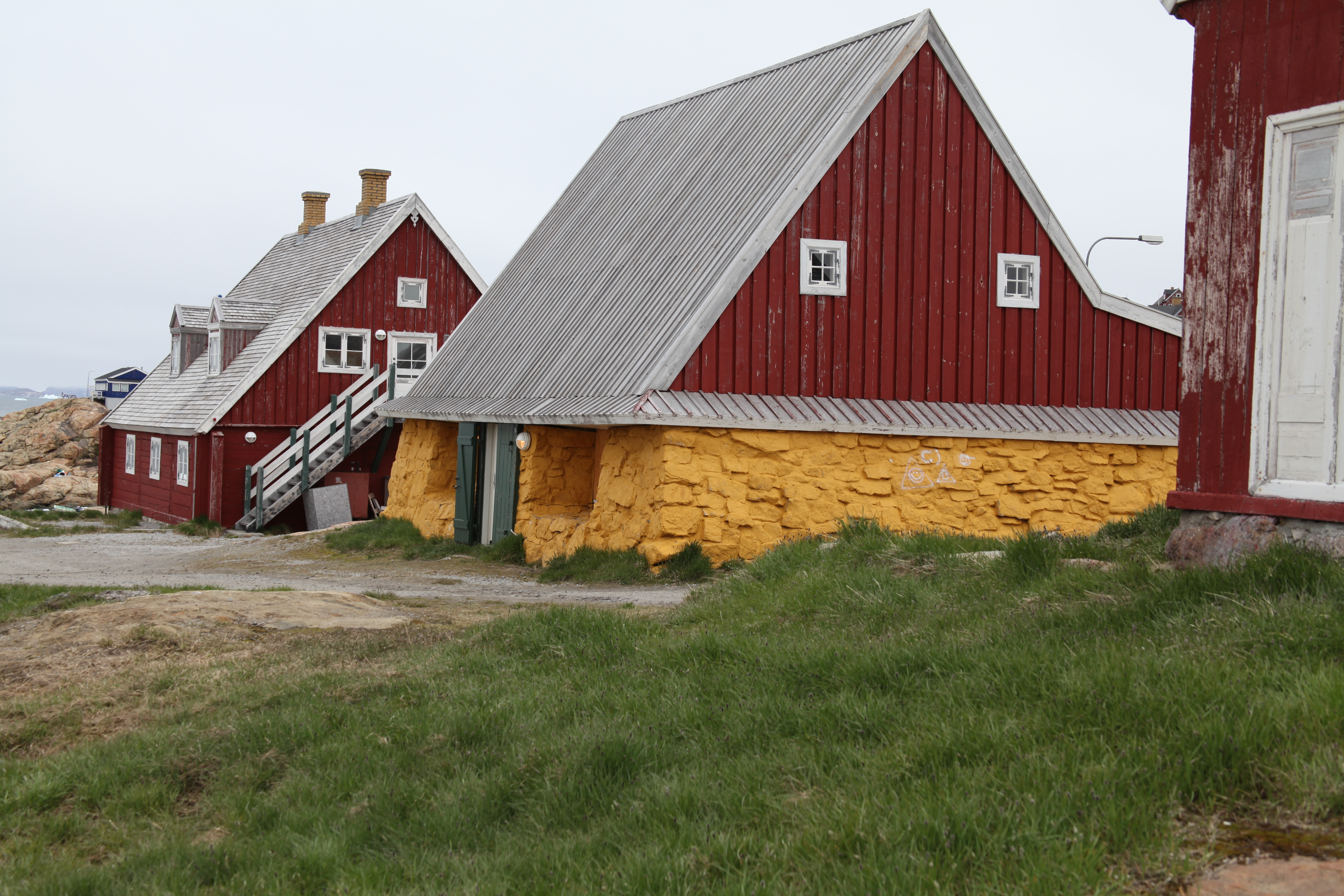
- Location: Greenland
- Coordinates: 72°47′N 56°09′W
- Website: www.upernavik.museum.gl
- Location of Upernavik Museum

Upernavik Museum is a museum in Upernavik, a town in northwestern Greenland. It is the oldest museum in Greenland, holding an extensive collection of local art. It has its own Museum Board that selects the artists, after recommendation from the curator of the museum.
