= List of cliffs by continent =

The following is an incomplete list of cliffs of the world.

== Asia ==
=== Above sea ===
- Ra's Sajir, Oman, 900 m (3,000 ft) above the Arabian Sea
- Tōjinbō, Sakai, Fukui prefecture, Japan 25 m above Sea of Japan
- Qingshui Cliff, Xiulin Township, Hualien County, Taiwan averaging 800 m above Pacific Ocean. The tallest peak, Qingshui Mountain, rises 2,408 m directly from the Pacific Ocean.
- Theoprosopon, between Chekka and Selaata in north Lebanon jutting into the Mediterranean.

=== Above land ===
- Nanga Parbat, Rupal Face, Azad Kashmir, Pakistan, 4,600 m
- Gyala Peri, southeast face, Mêdog County, Tibet, China, 4,600 m
- Ultar Sar southwest face, Karakoram, Gilgit–Baltistan, Pakistan, 3,000 m
- Qingshui Cliff, Xiulin Township, Hualien County, Taiwan averaging 800 m above Pacific Ocean. The tallest peak, Qingshui Mountain, rises 2,408 m directly from the Pacific Ocean.
- Trango Towers: East Face Great Trango Tower, Baltoro Muztagh, Gilgit–Baltistan, Pakistan, 1,340 m (near vertical headwall), 2,100 m (very steep overall drop from East Summit to Dunge Glacier). Northwest Face drops approximately 2,200 m to the Trango Glacier below, but with a taller slab topped out with a shorter overhanging headwall of approximately 1,000 m. The Southwest "Azeem" Ridge forms the group's tallest steep rise of roughly 2,286 m from the Trango Glacier to the Southwest summit.
- Uli Biaho Towers, Baltoro Glacier, Gilgit–Baltistan, Pakistan
- Baintha Brakk (The Ogre), Panmah Muztagh, Gilgit–Baltistan, Pakistan, 2,000 m
- The Latok Group, Panmah Muztagh, Gilgit–Baltistan, Pakistan, 1,800 m
- Spantik northwest face, Karakoram, Gilgit–Baltistan, Pakistan, 2,000 m
- Shispare Sar southwest face, Karakoram, Gilgit–Baltistan, Pakistan, 3,200 m
- Hunza Peak south face, Karakoram, Gilgit–Baltistan, Pakistan, 1,700 m
- Lhotse south face, Mahalangur Himal, Nepal, 3,200 m
- Lhotse northeast face, Mahalangur Himal, Nepal, 2,900 m
- K2 west face, Karakoram, Gilgit–Baltistan, Pakistan, 2,900 m
- Meru Peak, Uttarakhand, India, 1,200 m.
- Ramon Crater, Israel, 400 m
- Various cliffs in the Ak-Su Valley of Kyrgyzstan are high and steep.
- World's End, Horton Plains, Nuwara Eliya, Sri Lanka. It has a sheer drop of about 1,200 m.
- Various cliffs in Zhangjiajie National Forest Park, Hunan Province, China. The cliffs can get to around 300 m.

== Europe ==
=== Above sea ===
- Hornelen, Norway, 860 m above Skatestraumen
- Los Gigantes, Tenerife, Spain, 800m above Atlantic Ocean
- Cape Enniberg, Faroe Islands, 750 m above North Atlantic
- Croaghaun, Achill Island, Ireland, 688 m above Atlantic Ocean
- Hvanndalabjarg, Ólafsfjörður, Iceland, 630 m above Atlantic Ocean
- Vixía Herbeira, Northern Galicia, Spain, 621 m above Atlantic Ocean
- Preikestolen, Norway, 604 m above Lysefjorden
- Slieve League, Ireland, 601 m above Atlantic Ocean
- Monte Solaro, Capri, Italy, 589 m above the Mediterranean Sea
- Cabo Girão, Madeira, Portugal, 589 m above North Atlantic
- Jaizkibel, Spain, 547 m above the Bay of Biscay
- Beinisvørð, Faroe Islands, 470 m above North Atlantic
- Conachair, St Kilda, Scotland 427 m above Atlantic Ocean, highest sea cliff in the UK
- Cap Canaille, France, 394 m above Mediterranean sea is the highest sea cliff in France
- The Kame, Foula, Shetland, 376 m above the North Atlantic, second highest sea cliff in the UK
- St John's Head, Hoy, Orkney, 335m above the North Atlantic, highest purely vertical sea cliff in the UK
- Hangman cliffs, Devon 318 m above Bristol Channel is the highest sea cliff in England
- Benwee Head Cliffs, Erris, County Mayo, Ireland, 304 m above Atlantic Ocean
- Dingli Cliffs, Malta, 250 m above Mediterranean sea
- High Cliff, between Boscastle and St Gennys, 223 m above Celtic Sea
- Cliffs of Moher, Ireland, 217 m above Atlantic Ocean
- Beachy Head, England, 162 m above the English Channel
- Møns Klint, Denmark, 143 m above Baltic Sea
- Le Tréport, France, 110 m above the English Channel
- White cliffs of Dover, England, 100 m above the Strait of Dover
- Étretat, France, 84 m above the English Channel
- Kaliakra cliffs, Bulgaria, more than 70 m above the Black Sea
- Ontika Limestone cliff, Estonia, 55 m above Baltic Sea.
- Snake Island, Ukraine, 41 m above the Black Sea

=== Above land ===
- The six great north faces of the Alps (Eiger 1,500 m, Matterhorn 1,350 m, Grandes Jorasses 1,100 m, Petit Dru 1,000 m, and Piz Badile 850 m, Cima Grande di Lavaredo 450 m)
- Troll Wall, Norway 1,100 m above base
- Mięguszowiecki Szczyt north face rises to 1,043 m above Morskie Oko lake level, High Tatras, Poland
- Kjerag, Norway 984 m.
- Giewont (north face), Tatra Mountains, Poland, 852 m above Polana Strążyska glade
- Mont Granier, in the French Chartreuse Mountains, 700 m
- Vihren peak north face, Pirin Mountain, Bulgaria 460 m to the (Golemiya Kazan)
- Dvuglav, Rila Mountain, Bulgaria 460 m (south face)
- Vratsata, Vrachanski Balkan Nature Park, Bulgaria 400 m
- Belogradchik Rocks, Bulgaria - up to 200 m high sandstone towers

== North America ==
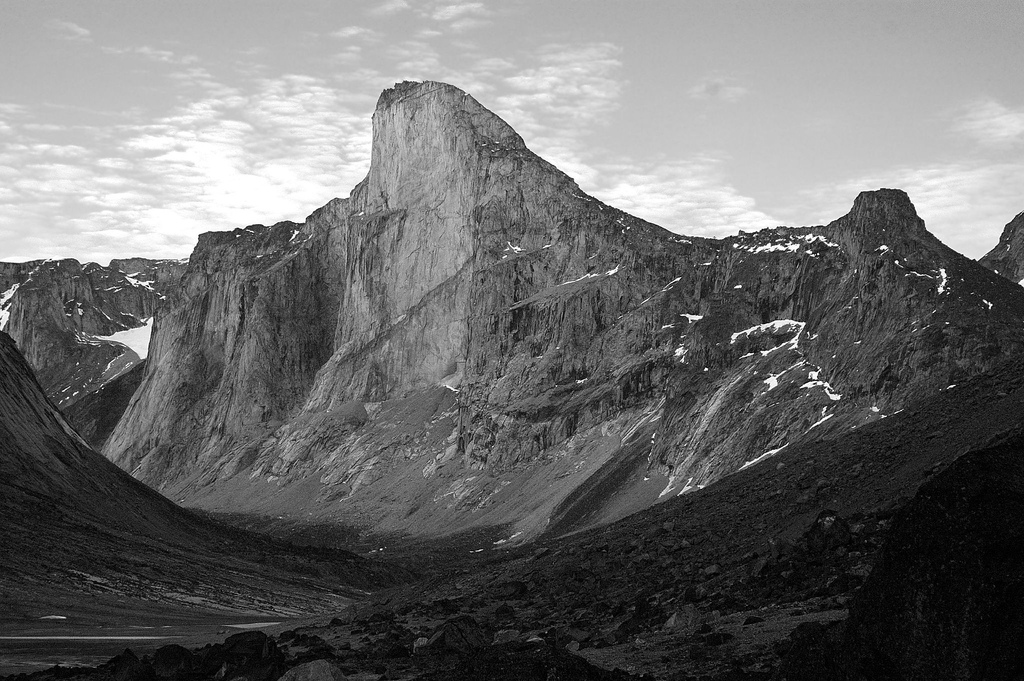
Mount Thor, Baffin Island, Nunavut, Canada, commonly regarded as the highest vertical drop on Earth

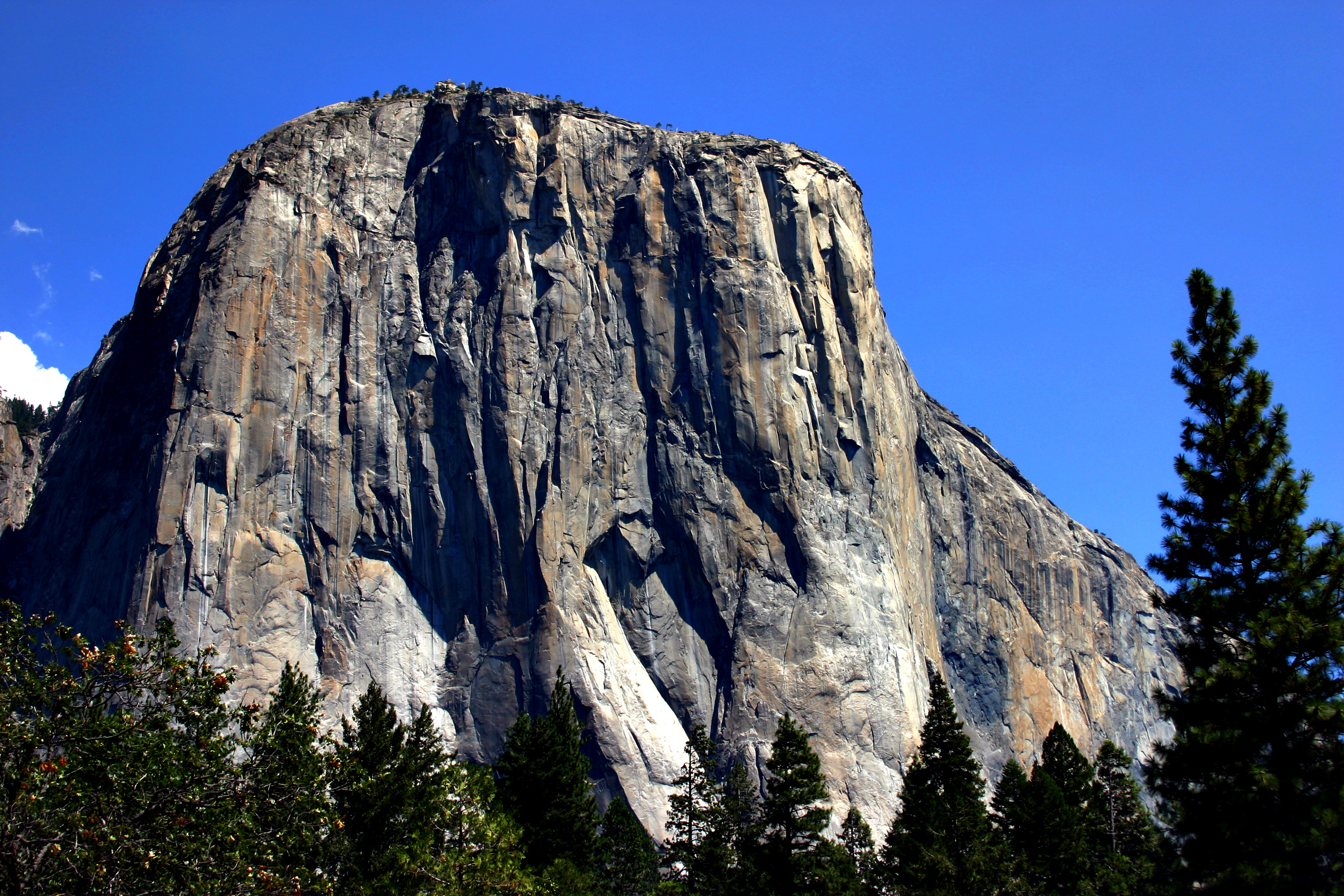
Southwest face of El Capitan from Yosemite Valley

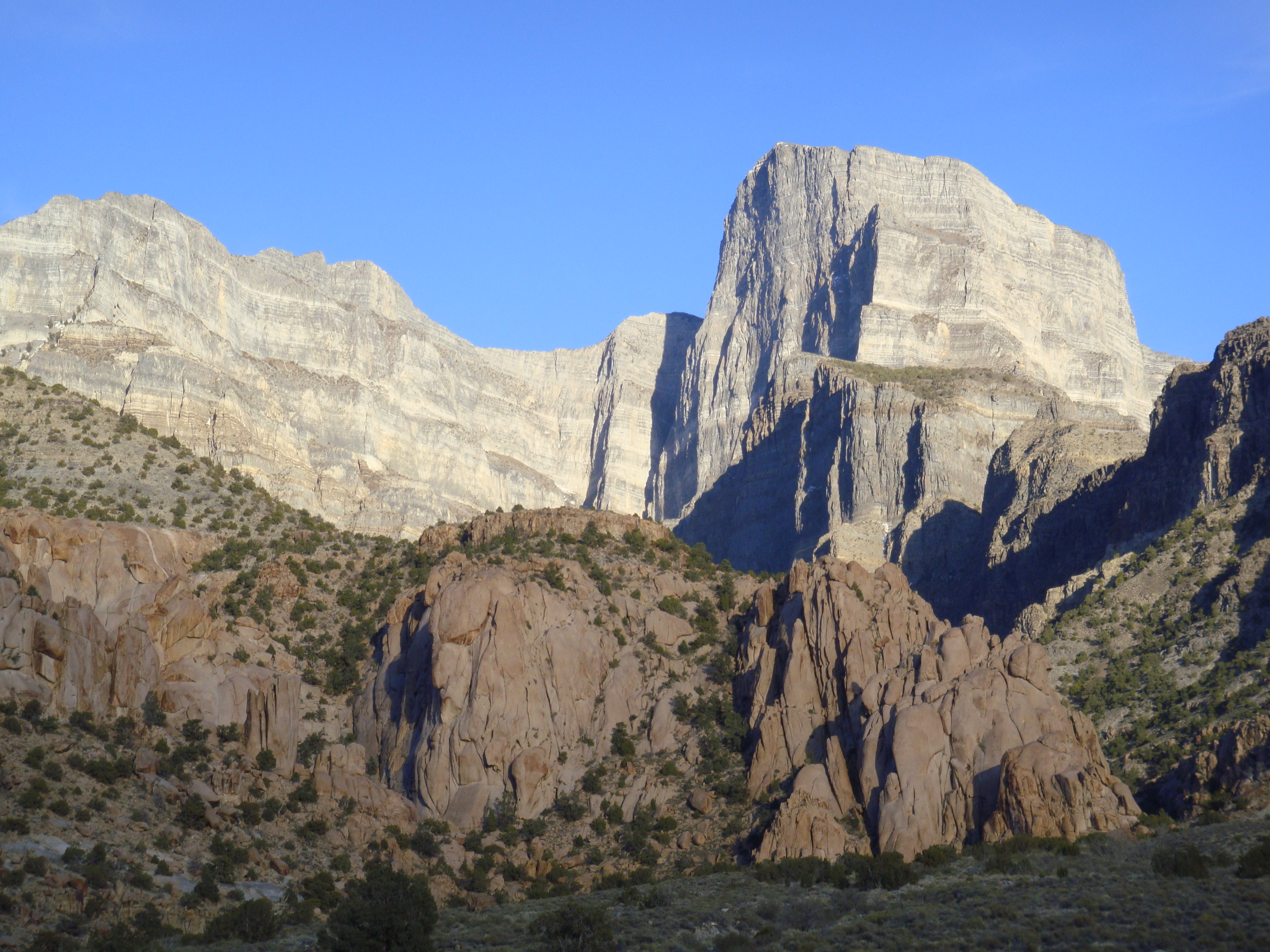
The face of Notch Peak at sunset

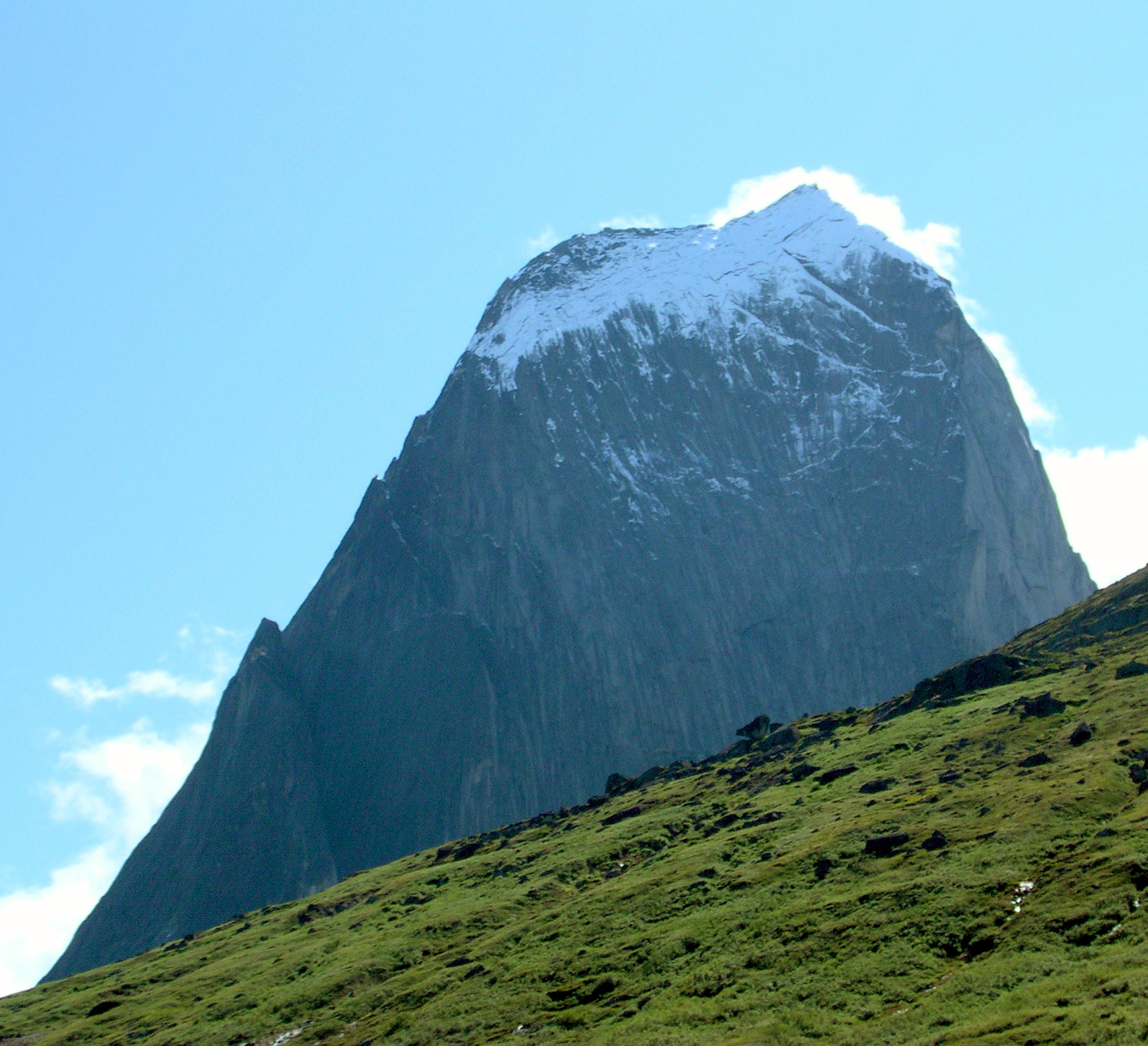
Ketil's west face in Tasermiut, Greenland

Several big granite faces in the Arctic region vie for the title of 'highest vertical drop on Earth', but reliable measurements are not always available. The possible contenders include (measurements are approximate):

- Mount Thor, Baffin Island, Canada; 1,370 metres (4,490 ft) total; the top 480 metres (1,570 ft) are overhanging. This is commonly regarded as being the largest vertical drop on Earth at 1,250 metres (4,100 ft).
- The sheer north face of Polar Sun Spire, Baffin Island, rises 4,300 ft above the flat frozen fjord, although the lower portion of the face breaks from the vertical wall with a series of ledges and buttresses.
- Ketil's and its neighbor Ulamertorsuaq's west faces in Tasermiut, Greenland have been reported as over 1,000 m high. Another relevant cliff in Greenland is Agdlerussakasit's Thumbnail.

Other notable cliffs include:

- Mount Asgard, Baffin Island, Canada; vertical drop of about 1,200 m (4,000 ft).
- El Capitan, Yosemite Valley, California, United States; 900 m (3,000 ft)
- Toroweap (a.k.a. Tuweep), Grand Canyon, Arizona, United States; 900 m (3,000 ft)
- Painted Wall in Black Canyon of the Gunnison National Park, Colorado, United States; 685 m (2,250 ft)
- Northwest Face of Half Dome, near El Capitan, California, United States; 1,444 m (4,737 ft) total, vertical portion about 610 m (2,000 ft)
- The west face of Notch Peak in the House Range of southwestern Utah, U.S.; a carbonate rock pure vertical drop of about 670 m (2,200 ft), with 4,450 feet (1,356 m) from the top of the cliff to valley floor (bottom of the canyon below the notch)
- East face of the West Temple in Zion National Park, Utah, United States believed to be the tallest sandstone cliff in the world, 670 m
- All faces of Devils Tower, Wyoming, United States, 195 m
- Faces of Shiprock, New Mexico, United States, 400 m
- Cap Éternité of Saguenay River, Quebec, Canada, 347 m
- The North Face of North Twin Peak, Rocky Mountains, Alberta, Canada, 1,200 m
- Raftsmen's Acropolis, a rock face of the Montagne des Érables, Quebec, Canada, 800 m
- Rockwall, Kootenay National Park, British Columbia, Canada, 30 km of mostly unbroken cliffs up to 900 m
- All walls of the Stawamus Chief, Squamish, British Columbia, Canada, up to 500 m
- Calvert Cliffs along the Chesapeake Bay in Maryland, U.S. 25 m
- Mount Siyeh, Glacier National Park (U.S.) north face, 1,270 m (4,170 ft)
- Longs Peak Diamond, Rocky Mountain National Park, Colorado, United States, 400 m
- Royal Gorge cliffs, Colorado, United States, 350 m
- Doublet Peak, southwest face, Wind River Range, Wyoming, United States, 370 m
- Big Sandy Mountain, east face buttress, Wind River Range, Wyoming, US, 550 m
- Temple Peak, east face, Wind River Range, Wyoming, US,400 m
- East Temple Peak, north face, Wind River Range, Wyoming, US, 450 m
- Uncompahgre Peak, northeast face, San Juan Range, Colorado, US, 275 m (550 m rise above surrounding plateau)
- Grand Teton, north face Teton Range, Wyoming, US 760 m (2,490 ft)
- Ättestupan Cliff, northern side of Kaiser Franz Joseph Fjord, Greenland 1,300 m (4,300 ft)

== South America ==
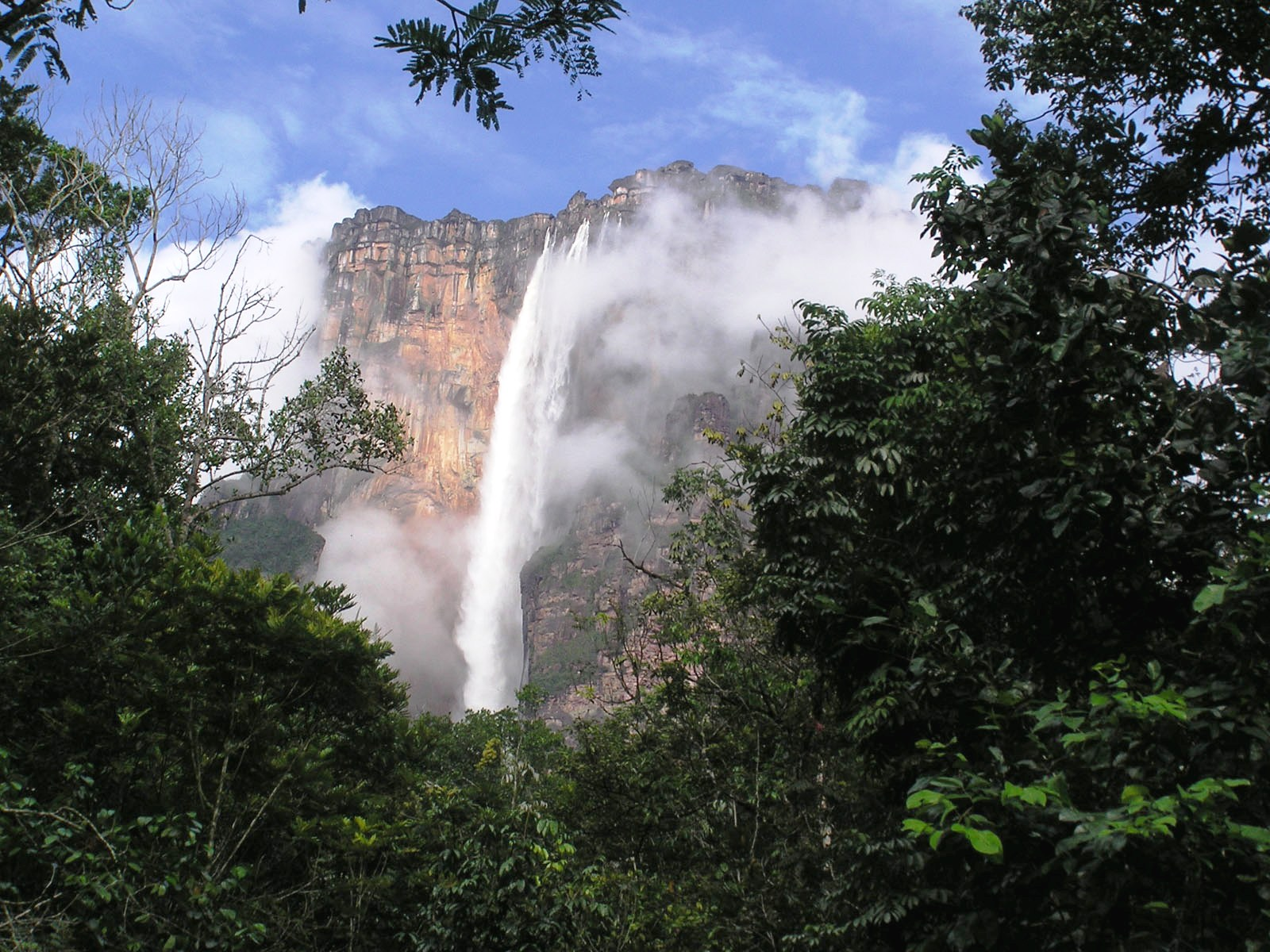
Salto Angel from Isla Ratón, Venezuela.

- Pared Sur Cerro Aconcagua. Las Heras, Mendoza, Argentina, 2,700 m
- Scratched Stone (Pedra Riscada), São José do Divino/MG, Minas Gerais, Brazil, 1,480 m
- All faces of Auyan Tepui, along with all other Tepuis, Venezuela, Brazil, and Guyana, Auyan Tepui is about 1,000 m (location of Angel Falls) (the falls are 979 m, the highest in the world)
- Pared de Gocta, Peru, 771 m
- Pedra Azul, Pedra Azul State Park, Espírito Santo, Brazil, 540 m
- Pão de Açúcar/Sugar Loaf, Rio de Janeiro, Brazil, 395 m
- All faces of Cerro Torre, Patagonia, Chile-Argentina
- All faces of Cerro Chalten (Fitz Roy), Patagonia, Argentina-Chile, 1200 m
- Faces of the Torres del Paine group, Patagonia, Chile, up to 900 m

== Africa ==
=== Above sea ===
- Faneque, Gran Canaria, Spain, 1,027 m above Atlantic Ocean
- Karbonkelberg, Cape Town, Western Cape, South Africa, 653 m (2,142 ft) above Hout Bay, Atlantic Ocean
- Los Gigantes, Tenerife, Canary Islands, Spain, 637 m (2,090 ft) above Atlantic Ocean
- Chapman's Peak, Western Cape, South Africa, 596 m (1,955 ft) above Atlantic Ocean
- Anaga's Cliffs, Tenerife, Canary Islands, Spain, 592 m (1,942 ft) above Atlantic Ocean
- Cabo Girão, Madeira, Portugal, 589 m above Atlantic Ocean
- Cape Hangklip, Western Cape, South Africa, 453.1 m (1,487 ft) above False Bay, Atlantic Ocean
- Cape Point, Western Cape, South Africa, 249 m (817 ft) above Atlantic Ocean

=== Above land ===
- Drakensberg Amphitheatre, South Africa 1,200 m (3,900 ft) above base, 5 km (3.1 mi) long. The Tugela Falls, the world's second tallest waterfall, falls 948 m (3,110 ft) over the edge of the cliff face.
- Mount Meru, Tanzania Caldera Cliffs, 1,500 m (4,900 ft)
- Tsaranoro, Madagascar, 700 m (2,300 ft) above base
- Karambony, Madagascar, 380 m (1,250 ft) above base.
- Innumerable peaks in the Drakensberg mountains of South Africa are considered cliff formations. The Drakensberg Range is regarded, together with Ethiopia's Simien Mountains, as one of the two finest erosional mountain ranges on Earth. Because of their near-unique geological formation, the range has an extraordinarily high percentage of cliff faces making up its length, particularly along the highest portion of the range. This portion of the range is virtually uninterrupted cliff faces, ranging from 600 m (2,000 ft) to 1,200 m (3,900 ft) in height for almost 250 km (160 mi). Of all, the "Drakensberg Amphitheatre" (mentioned above) is most well known. Other notable cliffs include the Trojan Wall, Cleft Peak, Injisuthi Triplets, Cathedral Peak, Monk's Cowl, Mnweni Buttress, etc. The cliff faces of the Blyde River Canyon, still part of the Drakensberg, may be over 800 m (2,600 ft), with the main face of the Swadini Buttress approximately 1,000 m (3,300 ft) tall.

== Oceania ==
=== Above sea ===
- Mitre Peak, New Zealand, 1,683 m above Milford Sound

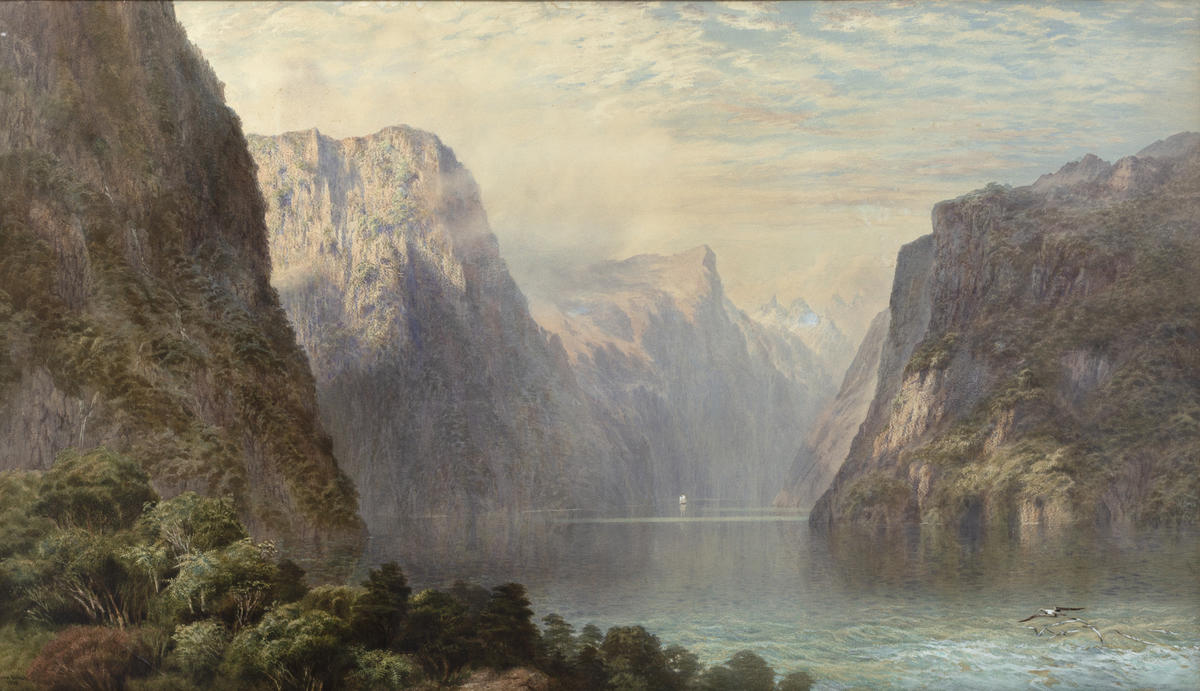
Milford Sound's cliffs

- The Lion, New Zealand, 1,302 m above Milford Sound (drops from approx 1,280 m to sea level in a very short distance)
- The Elephant, New Zealand, has cliffs falling approx 1,180m into Milford Sound, and a 900 m drop in less than 300 m horizontally
- Kalaupapa, Hawaii, 1,010 m above Pacific Ocean
- Great Australian Bight
- Zuytdorp Cliffs in Western Australia
- Ball's Pyramid, a sea stack 562 m high and only 200 m across at its base
- The Twelve Apostles (Victoria). A series of sea stacks in Australia, ranging from approximately 50 to 70 m above the Bass Strait
- Tasman National Park, Tasmania, has 300 m dolerite sea cliffs dropping directly to the ocean in columnar form
- Lovers Leap, Highcliff, and The Chasm, on Otago Peninsula, New Zealand, all 200 to 300 m above the Pacific Ocean

=== Above land ===
- Mount Banks in the Blue Mountains National Park, New South Wales, Australia: west of its saddle there is a 490 m fall within 100 m horizontally.
