= Stordalen Havn =

Sheltered natural harbour in Greenland

- Location in Greenland
- Location: Arctic
- Coordinates: 60°09′N 44°27′W
- Ocean/sea sources: North Atlantic Ocean
- Basin countries: Greenland
- Max. length: 1.6 km (0.99 mi)
- Max. width: 0.8 km (0.50 mi)

Stordalen Havn is a small, sheltered natural harbour at the northern end of Torsukattak Fjord in the district of Nanortalik, in Greenland.

Nearby Alleruusakasiit and Angiartarfik mountains have a good reputation among alpinists.

== Geography ==
Stordalen Havn is located at the bend in the Torssukatak Fjord, near the settlement of Tasiussaq. It is surrounded by mountains, the highest of which are Agdlerussakasit (1743 m) to the south of the river, and Angiartarfik (1824 m) to the north.

Since there are shoaling problems at low tide, anchorage is best made a short distance from the shore. Access can sometimes be impeded by ice floes in late spring, summer and autumn, but the sea is mostly clear.

The remains of a Greenland Norse building are located on the southern side of the Itivdlerssuaq river, not far from the shore.

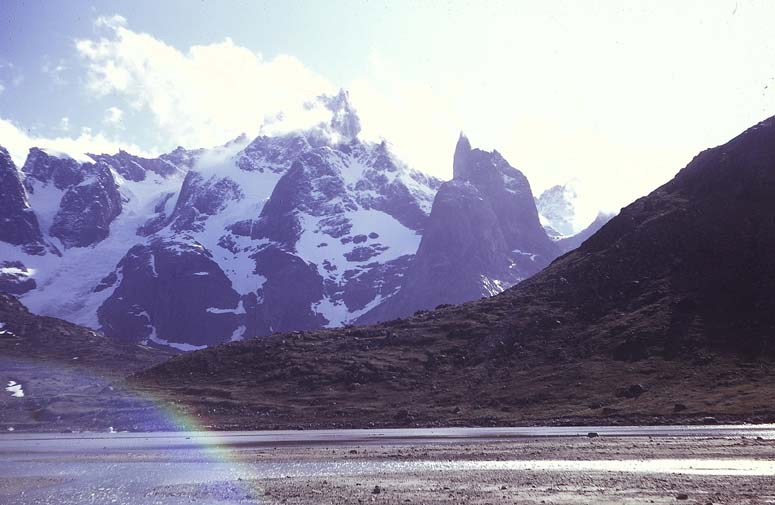
Stordalens Havn with Agdlerussakasit on the skyline

== Trekking, kayaking and climbing ==
It can be accessed by chartered boat, or by very experienced kayakers, or overland on foot from Tasiussaq. It attracts climbers, kayakers, and trekkers.

First ascents have now been made of most mountains in the area, starting with 44 first ascents by the University of St Andrews Expedition in 1975. Some of the mountains have challenging rock faces, including the famous "Thumbnail" of Maujit Qaqarssuasia, to the west of Torssukatak Fjord. There is huge potential for new climbing routes, and ascents by different ridges. In recent years, from 2000 onwards, Stordalen Havn has been visited by parties of trekkers, often accessing the area from Tasermiut Fjord. The small settlement of Aappilattoq to the east is extremely difficult to access on foot, but easily accessed by kayak.

There is a trekking route to the north of Stordalen Havn over to Ivssortussut valley (difficult ground on the north side of the col) and Kangerdluk fjord, from where a further mountain pass leads to Lake Taserssuaq and Tasermiut Fjord.

The trek west from Stordalens Havn up 'the big valley' called Itivdlerssuaq leads by an easy walking route to the settlement at Tasiussaq.

Access down Torssukatak Fjord to the south is only possible by kayak because of huge sea cliffs.

Copious supplies of fish such as arctic char can often be obtained from Stordalen Havn to supplement food stocks.
