= Angiartarfik =

Mountain in Greenland

- Angîârtarfik
- Location within Greenland

Highest point
- Elevation: 1,824 m (5,984 ft)
- Coordinates: 60°11′2″N 44°29′43″W

Geography
- Location: Kujalleq, Greenland

Angiartarfik, former spelling Angîârtarfik, is a mountain in the Kujalleq municipality, southern Greenland.

== Geography ==
Angiartarfik is a mountain with multiple rocky peaks, the highest of which reaches 1,824 m. This largely unglaciated mountain rises above Stordalen Havn, about 2 km west of the shore of Torsukattak Fjord.

In the same manner as neighbouring Alleruusakasiit, located across the valley to the south, Angiartarfik is a renowned mountain among alpinists, especially its east face.

== See also ==
- Big wall climbing
- List of mountains in Greenland
