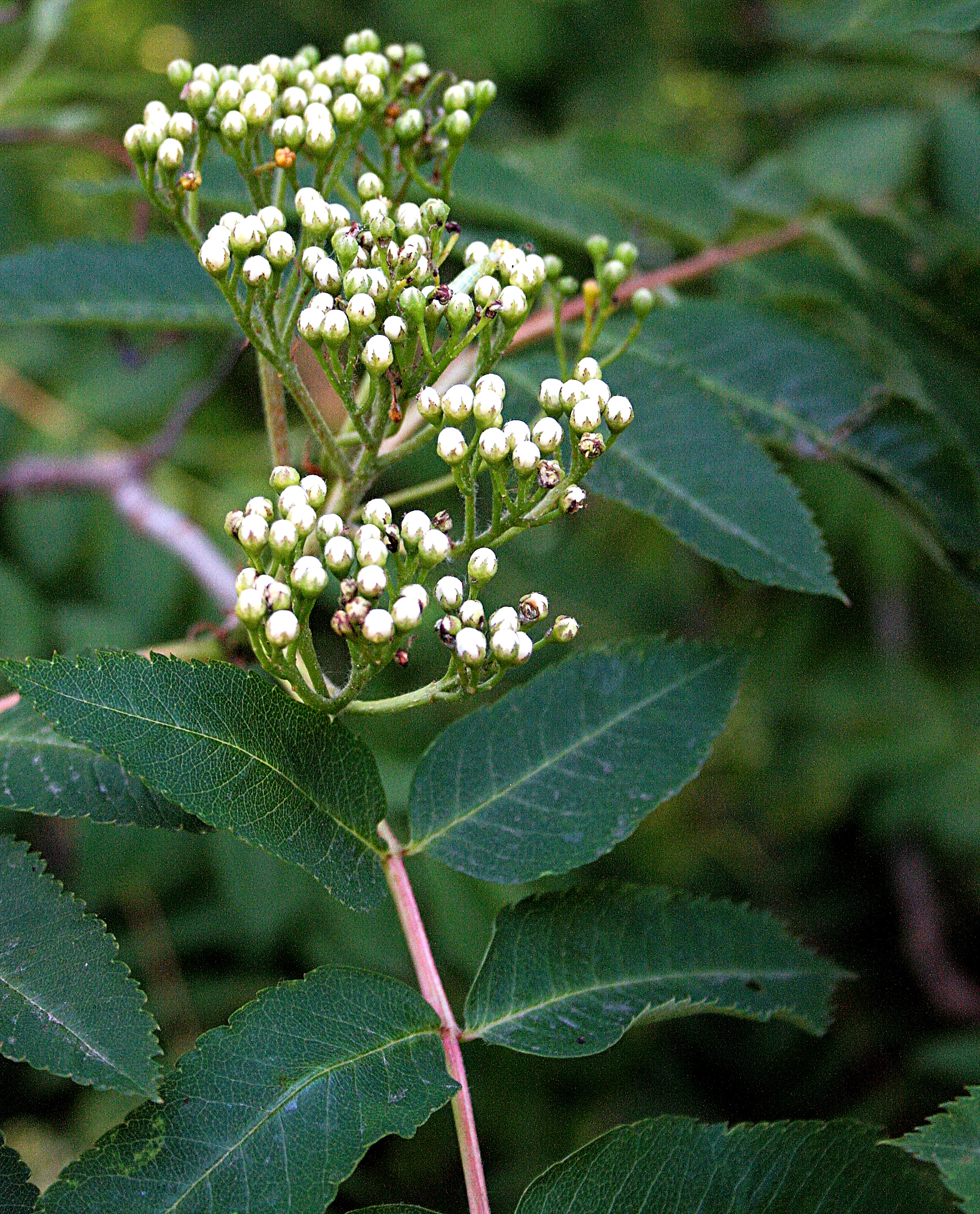
- At the Akureyri Botanical Gardens

Conservation status
- Secure (NatureServe)

Scientific classification
- Kingdom: Plantae
- Clade: Embryophytes
- Clade: Tracheophytes
- Clade: Spermatophytes
- Clade: Angiosperms
- Clade: Eudicots
- Clade: Rosids
- Order: Rosales
- Family: Rosaceae
- Genus: Sorbus
- Species: S. decora

Binomial name
- Sorbus decora (Sarg.) C.K.Schneid.
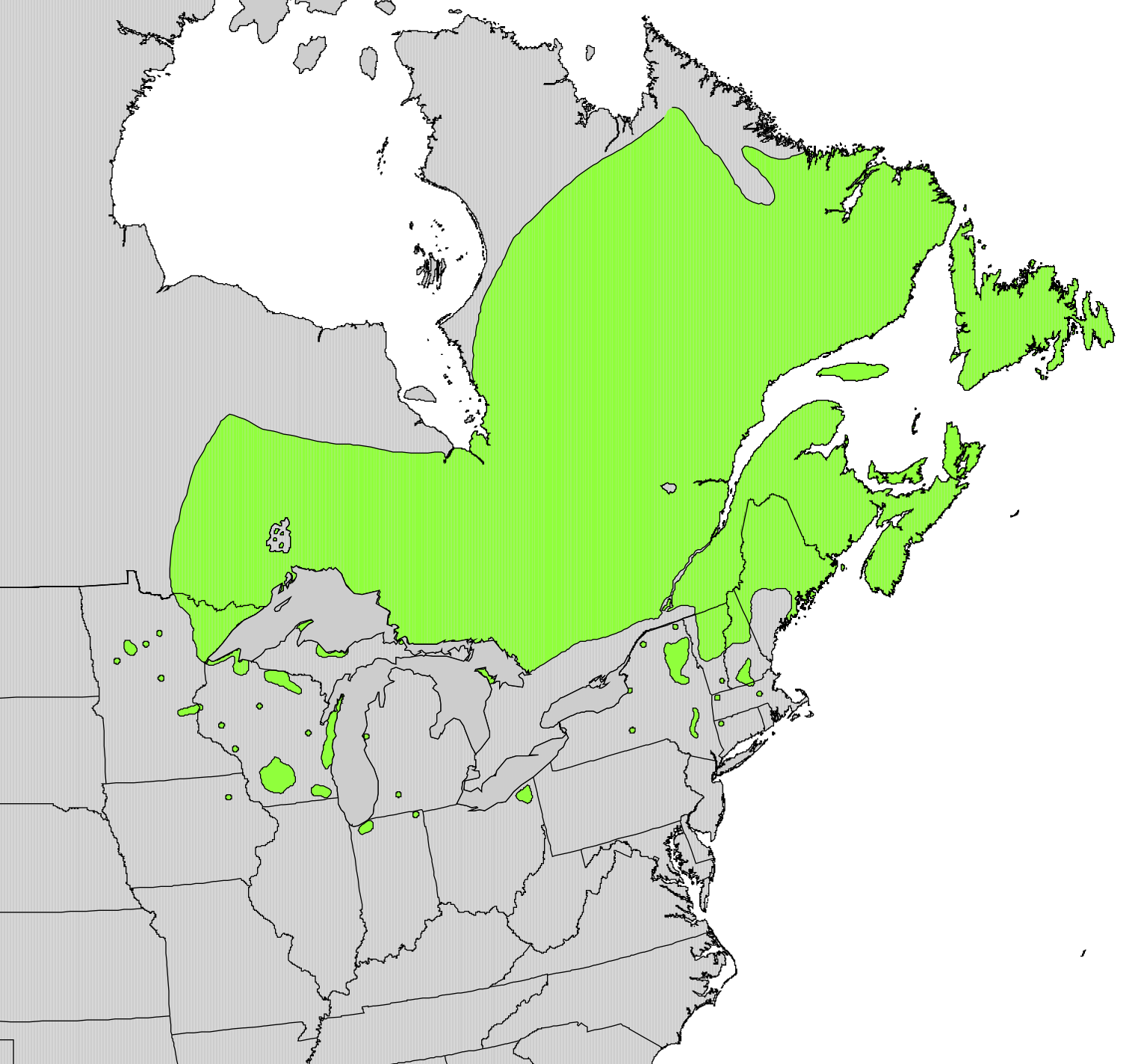
- Natural range includes southern tip of Greenland (not shown)

Synonyms
- List: Pyrus americana var. decora Sarg.; Pyrus decora (Sarg.) Hyland; Sorbus americana var. decora (Sarg.) Sarg.; Aucuparia subvestita (Greene) Nieuwl.; Pyrus decora var. groenlandica (C.K.Schneid.) Fernald; Pyrus dumosa (Greene) Fernald; Pyrus groenlandica (C.K.Schneid.) K.R.Robertson; Pyrus sambucifolia S.Watson & J.M.Coult.; Pyrus sitchensis B.L.Rob. & Fernald in; Pyrus subvestita (Greene) Farw.; Sorbus americana Pursh; Sorbus americana var. groenlandica C.K.Schneid.; Sorbus americana var. sitchensis (M.Roem.) Sudw.; Sorbus decora var. groenlandica (C.K.Schneid.) G.N.Jones; Sorbus dumosa House; Sorbus groenlandica (C.K.Schneid.) Á.Löve & D.Löve; Sorbus sambucifolia Dippel; Sorbus scopulina Hough; Sorbus subvestita Greene

= Sorbus decora =

Species of shrub

Sorbus decora, commonly known as the northern mountain ash, showy mountain-ash, Greenland mountain-ash, and dogberry, is a species of deciduous shrub or very small tree native to northeastern North America.

== Description ==
Sorbus decora grows 4–10 metres (13–33 ft) tall. Its leaves are odd-pinnately compound, with 11–17 leaflets. Each leaflet is 5–10 cm (2–4 in) long and 1–2.5 cm (3/8–1 in) wide. All parts are hairless to slightly hairy. Flowers are borne in 125- to more than 400-flowered panicles 6–25 cm (2 1/4–9 3/4 in) across. Each flower is 5–7.5 mm (1/4–1/4 in) across and has five white petals 2.5–3.5 mm (3/32–1/8 in) long, 14–20 stamens, and carpels with 3–4 styles. The fruits (pomes) are bright red to orange-red and 4–7 mm (5/32–9/32 in) across.

== Distribution and habitat ==
Sorbus decora occurs throughout the Laurentian Mixed Forest Province, the New England-Acadian forest region, the eastern Canadian boreal forests and Greenland. It cannot be found north of 62°15′N, which confines it the southern tip of Greenland, generally deeper up the western fjords, such as the Qinngua Valley.

== Similar species ==
Sorbus decora is very similar to the closely related American mountain-ash (Sorbus americana). Like the American mountain-ash, the showy mountain-ash has odd-pinnately compound leaves and often large clusters of flowers and fruits. Showy mountain-ash can be distinguished by its shiny, sticky buds, and its slightly larger flowers and fruit. It is said to bloom a week earlier.

== Uses ==
It is often cultivated as an ornamental plant for its cold-hardiness, its attractive flowers, and its large clusters of small red berry-like pomes.

The fruits are an important source of food for wildlife, particularly birds in the winter and early spring.
