= Tiningnertok =

Mountain in Southern Greenland

- Apostelen Tommelfinger
- Location within Greenland

Highest point
- Elevation: 2,291.48 m (7,518.0 ft)
- Coordinates: 60°35′54″N 43°49′13″W

Geography
- Location: Kujalleq, Greenland

Climbing
- First ascent: 1976

Tiningnertok (Danish: Apostelen Tommelfinger, meaning 'Thumb of the Apostle') is a mountain in King Frederick VI Coast, Kujalleq municipality, southern Greenland.

This mountain is popular among mountaineers, especially its Northeast Face, but it is of difficult access for it lies in an isolated area where climatic conditions are often rough. Its granite walls are similar to Ketil's.

== Geography ==
Tiningnertok is a massive 2,291.48 m (7,518.0 ft) ultra-prominent mountain with multiple peaks at the top. It rises steeply from the shore east of small Tininnertooq Bay on the northern side of the middle section of Lindenow Fjord (Kangerlussuatsiaq), west of the mouth of the Nørrearm branch of the fjord. Akuliarusersuaq is another massive peak rising barely 3 km to the southeast at 60°34′13″N 43°44′4″W to a height of 1,534.67 m (5,035.0 ft).

== History ==
The history of mountaineering in Southeast Greenland began quite recently. In 1971 members of the French Club Alpin of Paris reached the base of the Apostelen Tommelfinger by helicopter, but had to desist following a number of accidents and other problems. Two years later, in 1973, an Italian group of mountaineers also experienced failure while trying to climb this remote peak. Finally the 1976 expedition led by Frenchman Sylvain Jouty succeeded in climbing Tiningnertok.

== See also ==
- Big wall climbing
- List of mountains in Greenland
