= Napasorsuaq =

Mountain in southern Greenland

- Kirkespiret
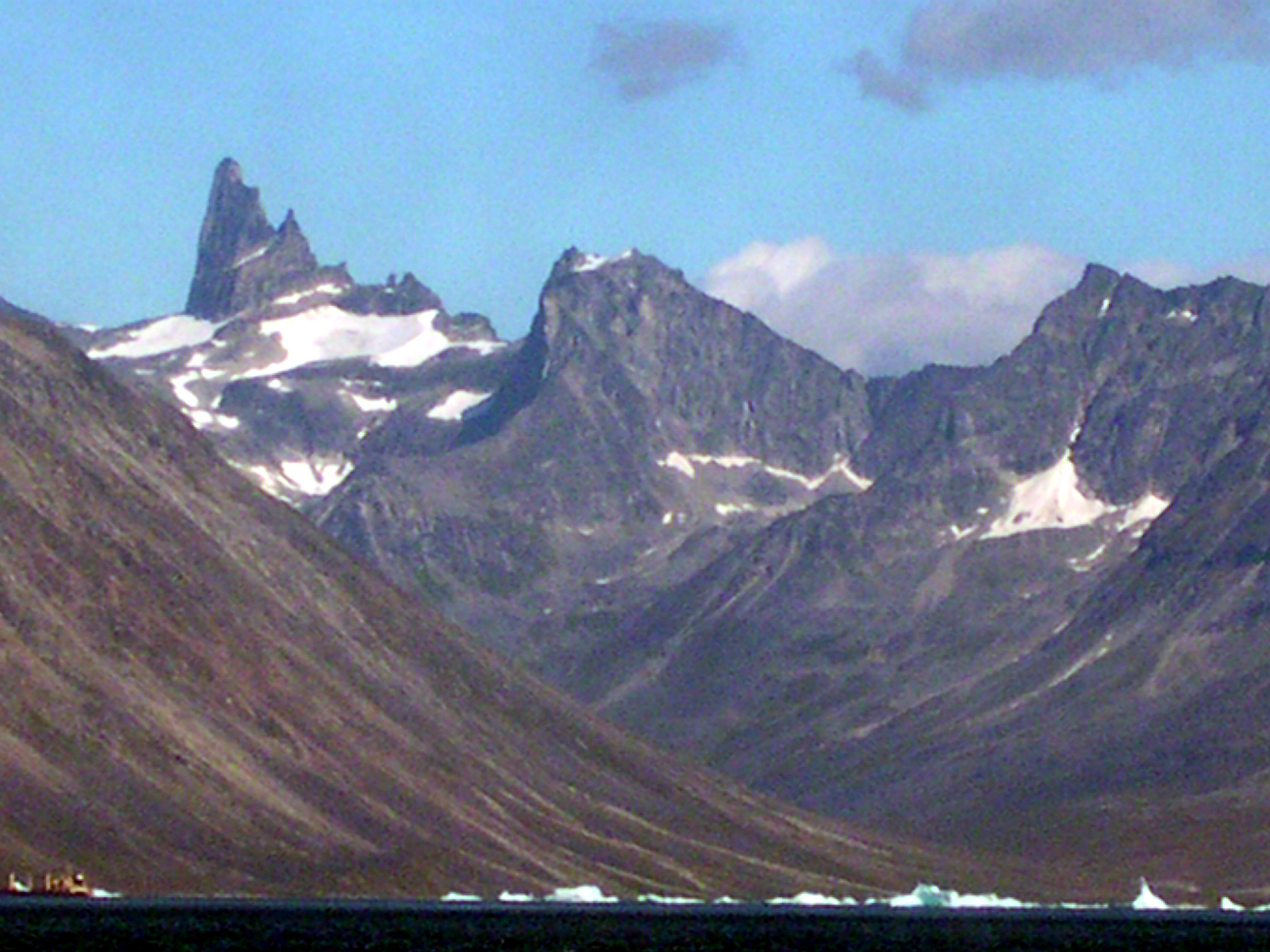

Highest point
- Elevation: 1,590 m (5,220 ft)
- Listing: List of mountains in Greenland
- Coordinates: 60°21′N 44°44′W

Geography
- Location within Greenland
- Location: Kujalleq, Greenland

The Napasorsuaq (Danish: Kirkespiret) is a 1,590m–high mountain in southern Greenland, in the Kujalleq municipality.

== Geography ==
The mountain rises in the mountainous peninsula of the mainland which forms the eastern side of the Southern Sermilik fjord. It is the highest peak of a moderately glaciated mountain chain stretching in a SW/NE direction with summits reaching 1,400 m. The Kirkespirdalen Dal valley, named after the mountain, stretches westwards onto the Saqqa Fjord.

The Napasorsuaq is a popular mountain among climbers because of its firm granite walls, similar to other peaks in the region such as Ketil and Ulamertorsuaq.

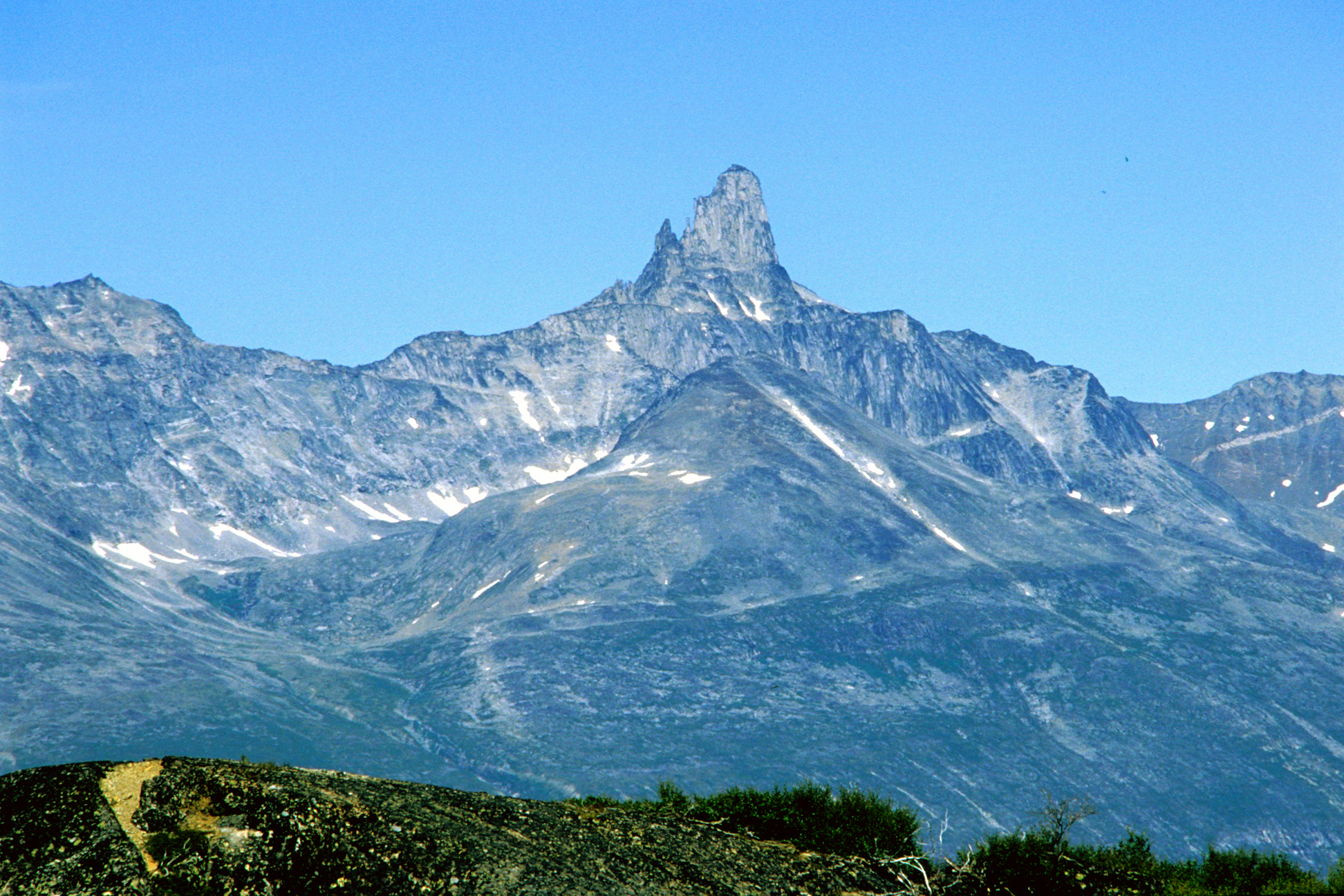
View of the South Face of Napasorsuaq.

== See also ==
- Big wall climbing
- List of mountains in Greenland
