= Nalumasortoq =

Mountain in Greenland

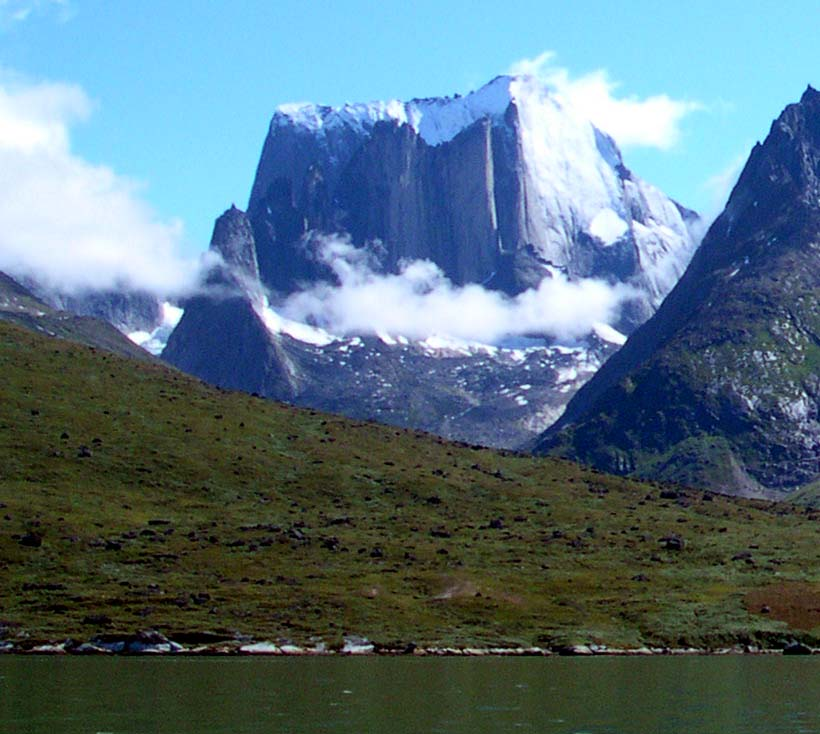
- View of the West Face from Tasermiut Fjord

Highest point
- Elevation: 2,045 m (6,709 ft)
- Listing: List of mountains in Greenland
- Coordinates: 60°23′12″N 44°28′10″W

Geography
- Location within Greenland
- Location: Kujalleq, Greenland

The Nalumasortoq or Naluumasortoq is a 2,045-meter-high (6,709 ft) mountain in southern Greenland, in the Kujalleq municipality.

== Geography ==
The mountain rises not far from Nanortalik, in the mountainous peninsula of the mainland which forms the eastern side of the Tasermiut Fjord.

The Nalumasortoq closes an east-facing valley that lies between the Ulamertorsuaq and Ketil mountain peaks, and at 2,045 m (6,709 ft) it is the tallest peak of the group. Glaciers appear only below 1,600 meters (5,200 ft) in the east, northwest and southwest. Its massive western wall is especially popular among mountain climbers.

== See also ==
- Big wall climbing
- List of mountains in Greenland

== Bibliography ==
- Greenland Tourism: Hiking Map South Greenland/Tasermiut fjorden – Nanortalik. 1996
