= Sawtooth Mountain (Utah) =

Mountain in Utah, United States

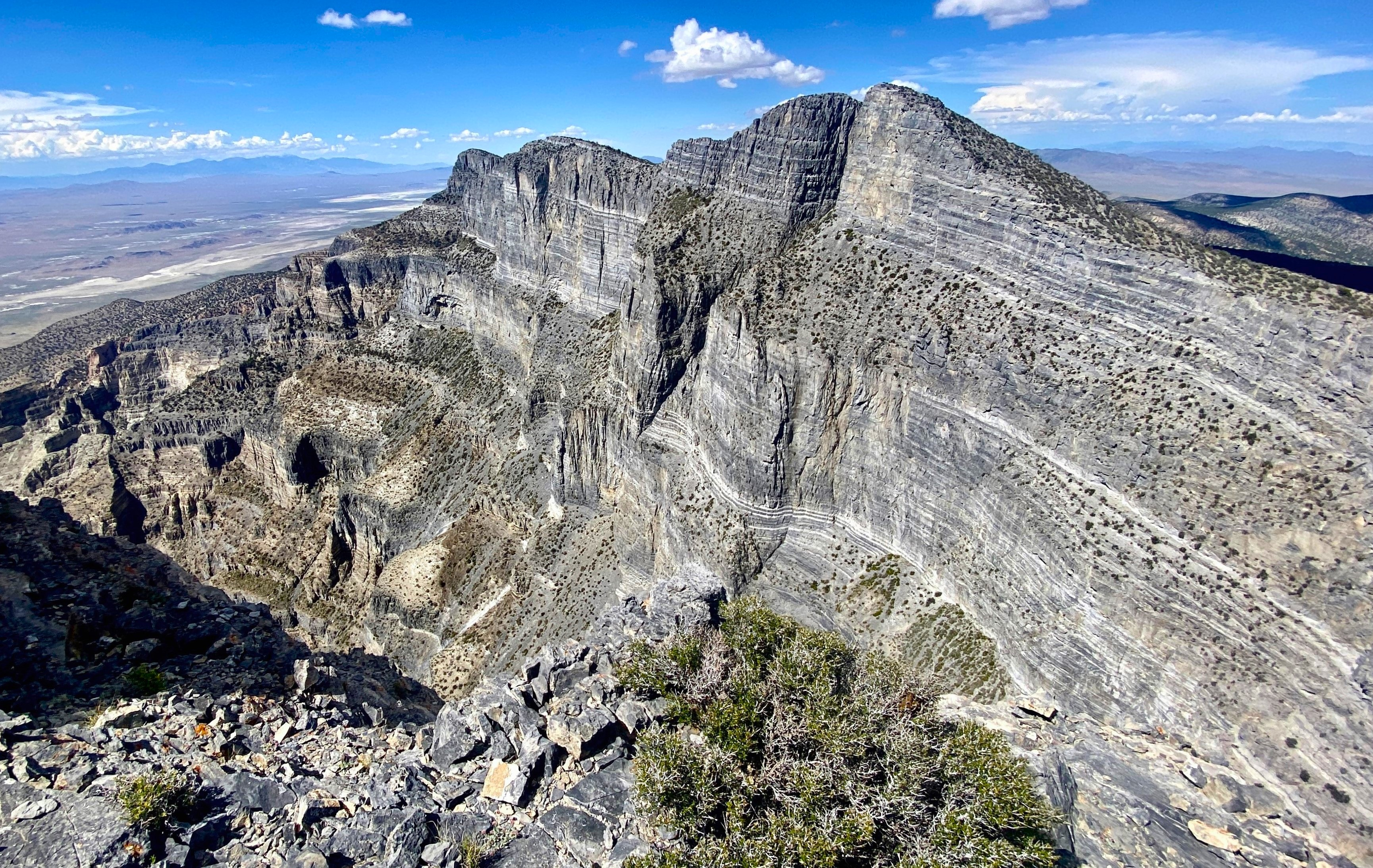

Highest point
- Elevation: 9,600 ft (2,926 m)
- Prominence: 313 ft (95 m)
- Parent peak: Notch Peak (9,658 ft)
- Isolation: 0.94 mi (1.51 km)
- Coordinates: 39°08′32″N 113°24′34″W

Geography
- Location within Utah Location within the United States
- Country: United States
- State: Utah
- County: Millard
- Protected area: Notch Peak Wilderness Study Area
- Parent range: House Range; Great Basin Ranges
- Topo map: USGS Notch Peak

Geology
- Rock age: Cambrian to Ordovician
- Rock type: Carbonate rock

Sawtooth Mountain is a 9,600-foot elevation (2,926 m) mountain summit in Millard County, Utah, United States.

== Description ==
Sawtooth Mountain is part of the House Range which is a subrange of the Great Basin Ranges. The remote massif is set within the Notch Peak Wilderness Study Area on land administered by the Bureau of Land Management. Slopes of the mountain are covered with pinyon–juniper, sagebrush-horsebrush, white fir, bristlecone pine, ponderosa pine, and aspen. Topographic relief is significant as the summit rises over 4,000 feet (1,200 meters) above Tule Valley in two miles. This landform's toponym was officially adopted in 1961 by the U.S. Board on Geographic Names.

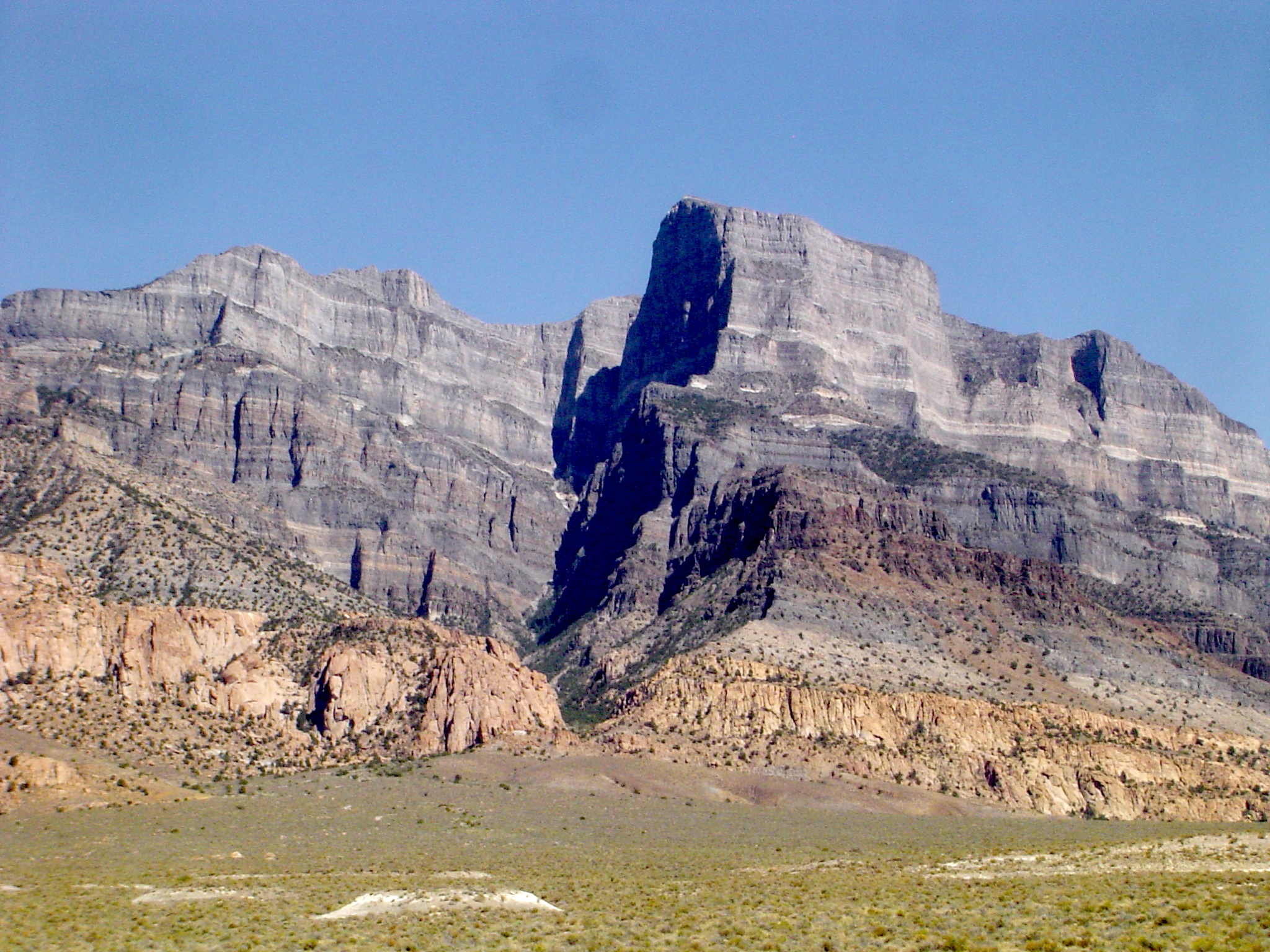
Sawtooth Mountain (left) and Notch Peak (right)

== Climate ==
Sawtooth Mountain is set within the Great Basin Desert which has hot summers and cold winters. The desert is an example of a cold desert climate as the desert's elevation makes temperatures cooler than lower elevation deserts. Due to the high elevation and aridity, temperatures drop sharply after sunset. Summer nights are comfortably cool. Winter highs are generally above freezing, and winter nights are bitterly cold, with temperatures often dropping well below freezing.

== See also ==
- List of mountain peaks of Utah
- Great Basin
