= Southern Sermilik =

Fjord in Greenland

- Søndre Sermilik (Danish)
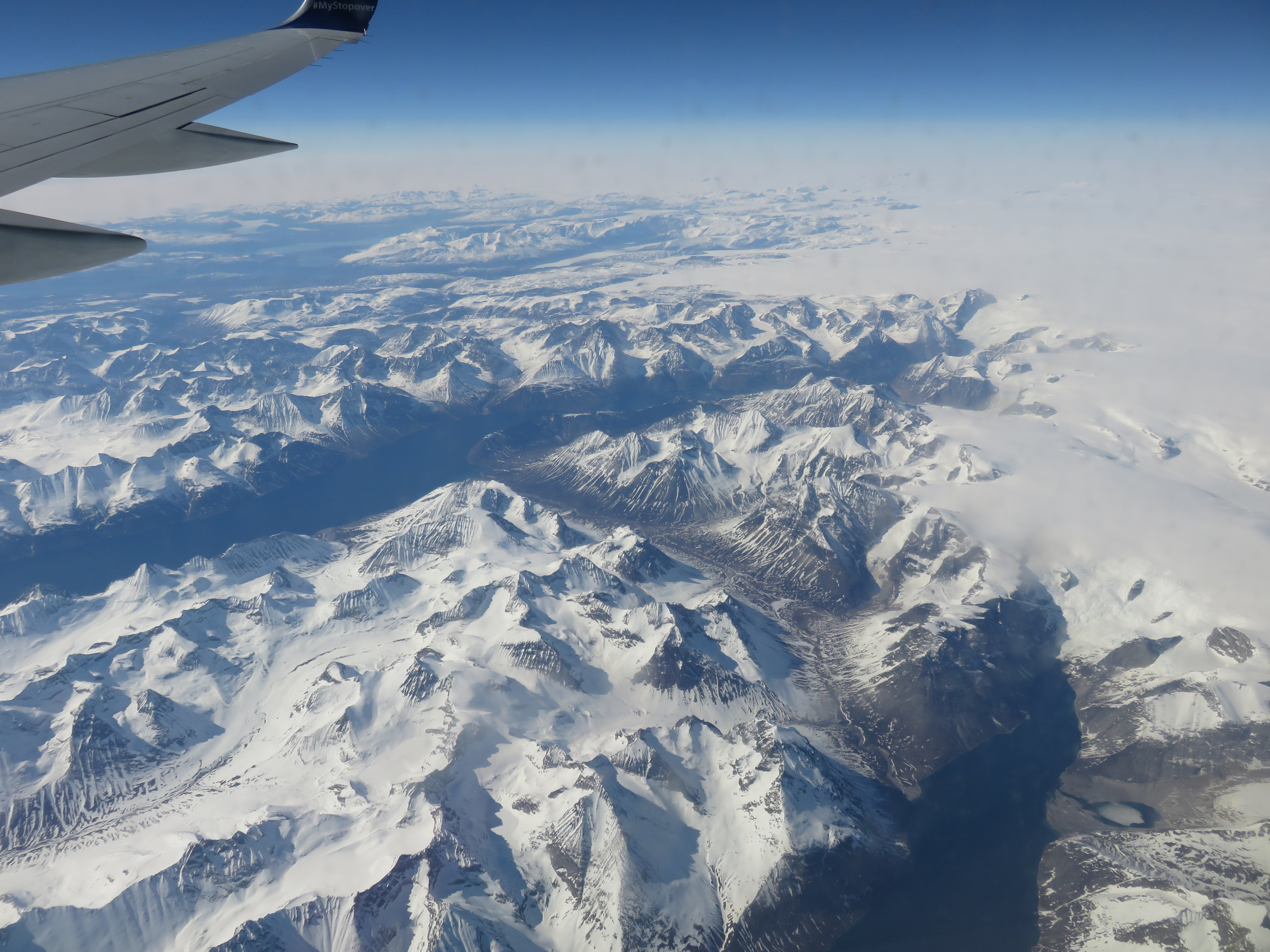
- Upper part of Southern Sermilik in 2018

- Location in Greenland
- Location: Arctic
- Coordinates: 60°34′N 44°47′W
- Ocean/sea sources: Labrador Sea
- Basin countries: Greenland
- Max. length: 80 km (50 mi)
- Max. width: 4.3 km (2.7 mi)

Southern Sermilik (Danish: Søndre Sermilik) is a fjord in southwestern Greenland. Administratively it is part of the Kujalleq municipality.

== Geography ==
The fjord is oriented in a roughly NE/SW direction, to the southwest the Southern Sermilik Fjord opens into the Labrador Sea of the North Atlantic Ocean. It separates two long mountainous peninsulas, the mountains on the northwestern side of the fjord rising steeply from the shore to heights of over 2,000 m (6,600 ft), and the 1,590 m high Napasorsuaq peak rising in the peninsula to the east of the fjord.

The islands of Amitsok and Angmalortoq —the latter rising to a height of 1,253 m— lie at the mouth of the fjord. There are further islands beyond them, Sermersooq Island being the largest.

The Sermeq Glacier at the inland end of this fjord has been undergoing a well documented recession in recent history. A similar retreat of the glacier at the fjord's head has been documented in neighbouring Tasermiut Fjord as well.

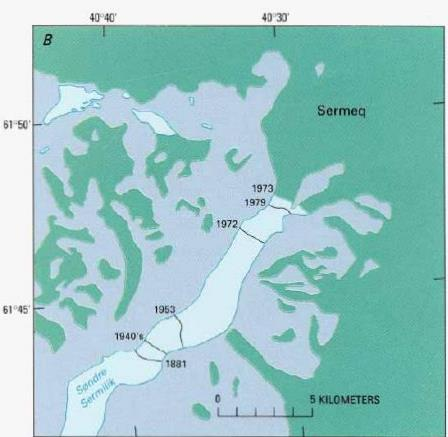
Map of the fjord showing the variation in the position of the terminus of the Sermeq Glacier between 1881 and 1979.

== Bibliography ==
- Ivar Haug (2005). Gazetteer of Greenland UBiT (Trondheim University Library), ISBN 82-7113-114-1

== See also ==
- List of fjords of Greenland
