= Qinngua Valley =

Valley in southern Greenland

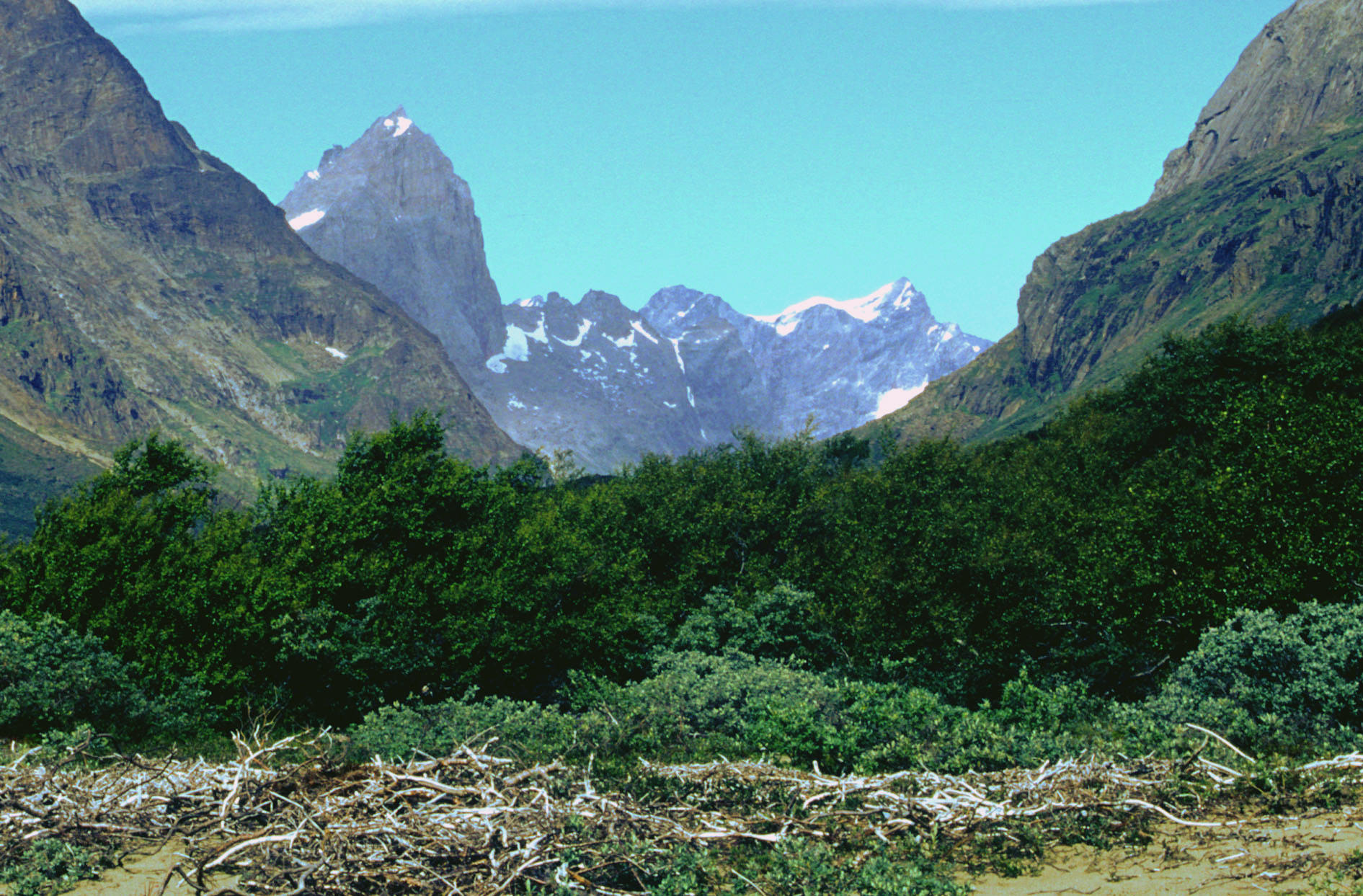
- A view of the Qinngua valley (2008)

- Location within Greenland
- Floor elevation: 550 m (1,800 ft) to 2 m (6.6 ft)
- Length: 15 km (9.3 mi)

Geography
- Country: Greenland
- Coordinates: 60.3019°N 44.475°W
- Interactive map of Qinngua Valley

Qinngua Valley, also called Qinnguadalen, Kanginsap Qinngua and Paradisdalen, is a valley in southern Greenland, about 15 kilometres (9.3 mi) from the nearest settlement of Tasiusaq, Kujalleq. The valley has the only natural forest in Greenland and is about 15 kilometres (9.3 mi) long, running roughly north to south and terminating at Tasersuaq Lake. The lake drains into Tasermiut Fjord. Mountains rise as much as 1,500 metres (4,900 ft) on either side of the narrow valley.

The valley is situated about 50 kilometres (31 mi) from the sea and protected from the cold winds coming off the interior glaciers of Greenland. In total, over 300 species of plants grow in the valley. The forest in Qinngua Valley is a thicket consisting mainly of downy birch (Betula pubescens) and gray-leaf willow (Salix glauca), growing up to 7–8 metres (23–26 ft) tall. Growing sometimes to tree height is the Greenland mountain ash (Sorbus decora), which is usually a shrub. Green alder (Alnus alnobetula) is also found in the valley.

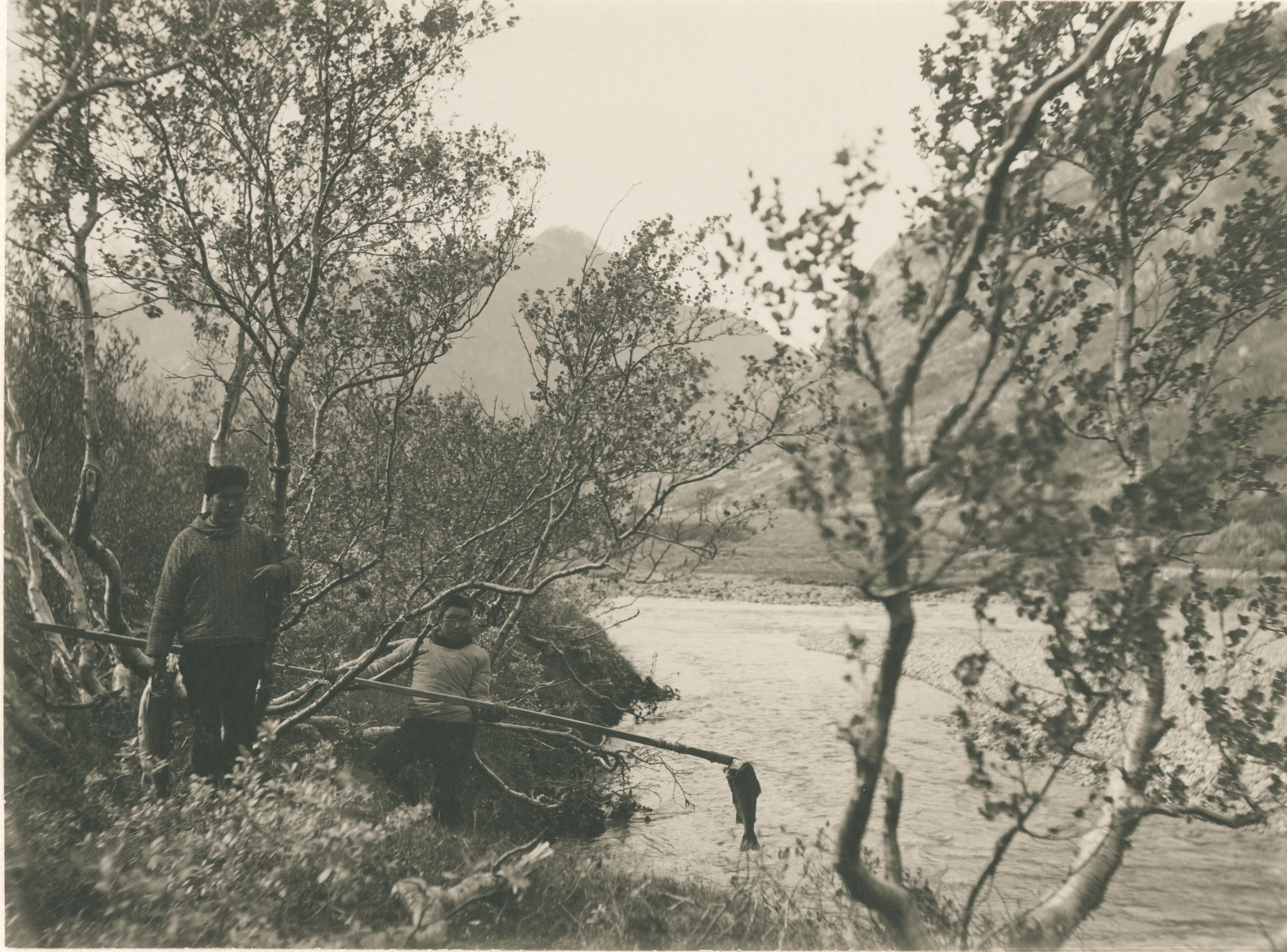
Trees in the Qinngua valley (1900)

It is possible that other forests of this type once existed in Greenland but were cleared by early settlers for firewood or building material. The valley may have been a protected natural area since 1930, but the statute of protection is from 2005.

Although nearly all of ice-free Greenland has an Arctic tundra climate (ET in the Köppen climate classification), Qinngua Valley may have a sub-arctic (Dfc) climate.
