= Tasiusaq, Kujalleq =

Tasiusaq
- Settlement
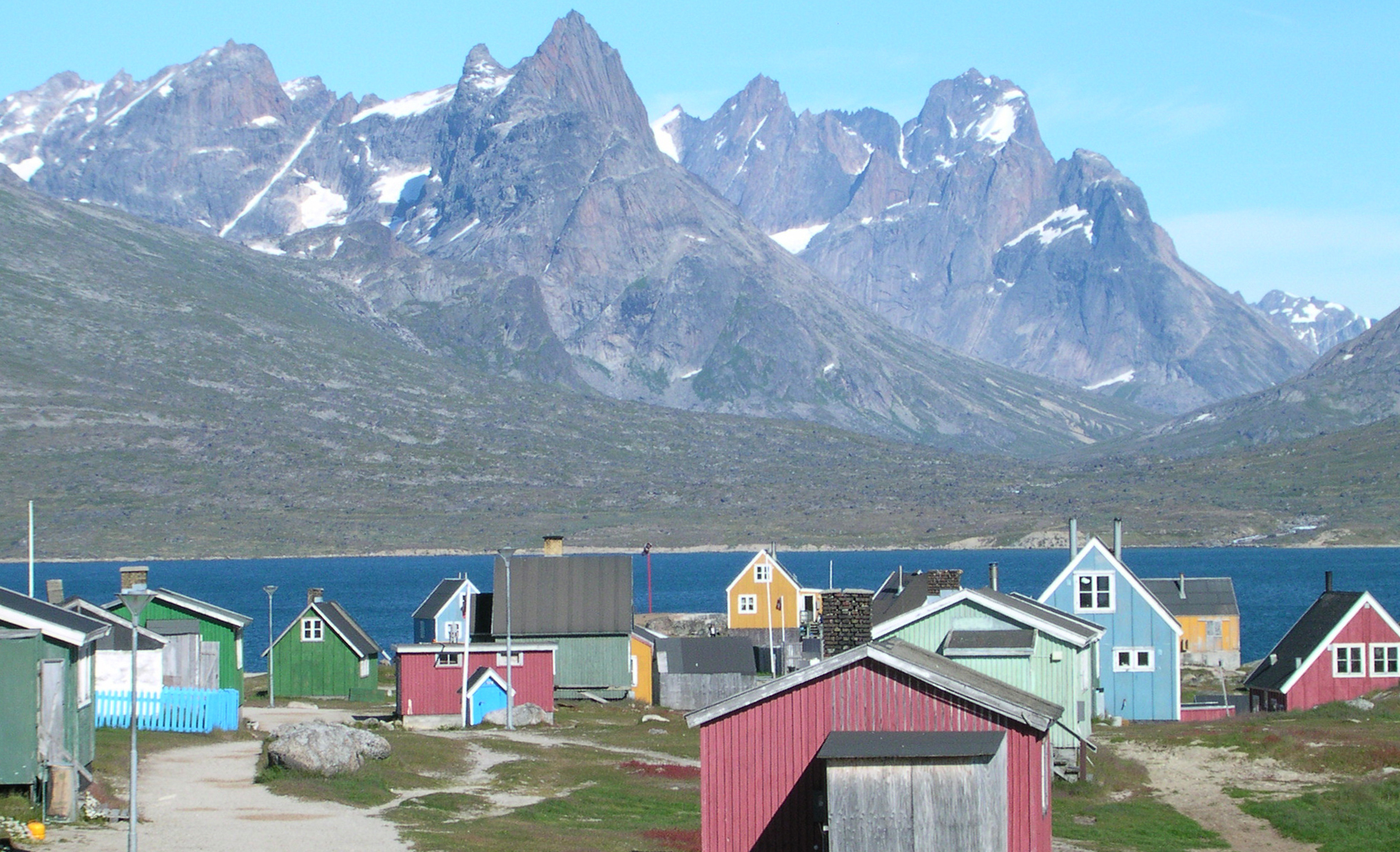
- Tasiusaq

- Location within Greenland
- Coordinates: 60°11′35″N 44°49′11″W
- State: Kingdom of Denmark
- Constituent country: Greenland
- Municipality: Kujalleq

Government
  - Mayor: Karta Korneliussen
- Elevation: 18 m (60 ft)

Population (2025)
  - Total: 37
- Time zone: UTC−02:00 (WGT)
  - Summer (DST): UTC−01:00 (WGST)
- Postal code: 3922 Nanortalik

Tasiusaq is a settlement in the Kujalleq municipality in southern Greenland, founded in 1933. It is located at the Tasermiut Fjord (Danish: Ketils Fjord), east of Nanortalik. Its population was 42 in 2025. In the Greenlandic language, the name of the settlement means "like a lake", referring to the lake-looking bay it's situated on. The inhabitants call it "Tasiisaq", which is the local dialect.

There are several sheep farms in the wider Tasiusaq area; the farms of Nalasut with 10 inhabitants, Saputit with 3 inhabitants, and Nuugaarsuk with four inhabitants.

Until January 2009 the settlement belonged to the Nanortalik municipality. On 1 January 2009 the settlement became part of the Kujalleq municipality, when the Narsaq, Qaqortoq, and Nanortalik municipalities ceased to exist as administrative entities.

== Infrastructure and transportation ==
The settlement has a local school, a church, a general store, and a general repairs workshop maintained by the Kujalleq municipality. The school in the settlement--Malakip atuarfia—had 14 pupils in the year 2005/2006. Additionally, the school runs a camp at Nuugaarsuk by the Tasermiut Fjord. The school also doubles as a kindergarten for the smallest children in the settlement.

There is also a 16-bed youth hostel with camping equipment and horses in the settlement. Transportation is available on request.

=== Transportation ===
Tasiusaq Heliport operates year-round, linking Tasiusaq with Narsarsuaq Airport and, indirectly, with the rest of Greenland and Europe.

Tasiusaq is not connected to any other place via roads. Fairly well trodden hiking trails lead north and west from the town, but for any motorized transportation terrain vehicles are needed.

== Geography and climate ==
The settlement is in the Tasermiut Fjord. Due to its favourable location the area has a remarkably mild climate. The Saputit and Saputit Tasia sheep farms even have minor forms of agriculture.

Further, the nature reserve of Qinngua Valley at nearby Tasersuaq Lake is considered the place with the only natural forest in Greenland; while the forest is only a few acres in size, the sub-arctic willow and birch trees that usually only reach a height of a few centimeters can reach a height of several meters in the valley.

== Population ==
Most towns and settlements in southern Greenland exhibit negative growth patterns over the last two decades, with many settlements rapidly depopulating. The population of Tasiusaq has decreased by 66% from 1977 (122) to 2025 (42).

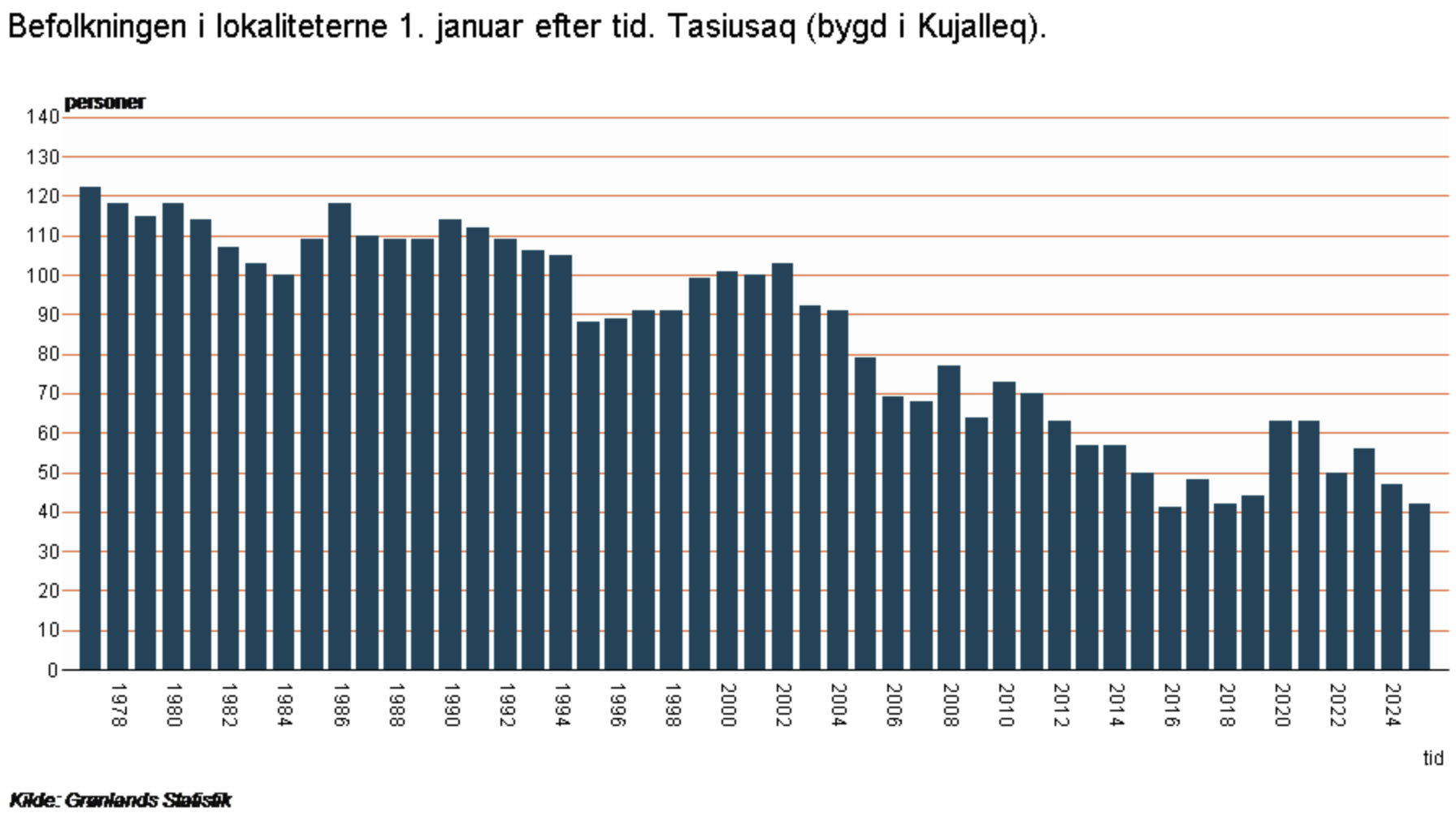
Tasiusaq population growth dynamics in the last two decades. Source: Statistics Greenland
