= Tasermiut Fjord =

Body of water in Greenland

- Location in Greenland
- Location: Arctic
- Coordinates: 60.27°N 44.78°W
- Ocean/sea sources: Labrador Sea
- Basin countries: Greenland
- Max. length: 70 km (43 mi)
- Max. width: 4.1 km (2.5 mi)

Tasermiut Fjord is a 70-kilometre-long fjord in southwestern Greenland. Administratively it is part of the Kujalleq municipality. Nanortalik Island is located near the mouth of the fjord.

Tasermiut Fjord has some of the very few growths of dwarf trees in Greenland, notably in Qinngua Valley and Tiningnertoq valley.

== Geography ==
The fjord is oriented in a roughly NE/SW direction, to the southwest the fjord opens into the Labrador Sea of the North Atlantic Ocean. It separates two long mountainous peninsulas, the 1,590 m high Napasorsuaq peak rising in the peninsula to the west of the fjord. To the east rise the 1,858 m high Ulamertorsuaq, the 2,045 m high Nalumasortoq and the 2,010 m high Ketil.

The glacier at the inland end of this fjord has been undergoing a well documented recession in recent history. A similar retreat of the glacier at the fjord's head has been documented in the Sermeq Glacier in neighbouring Southern Sermilik Fjord as well.

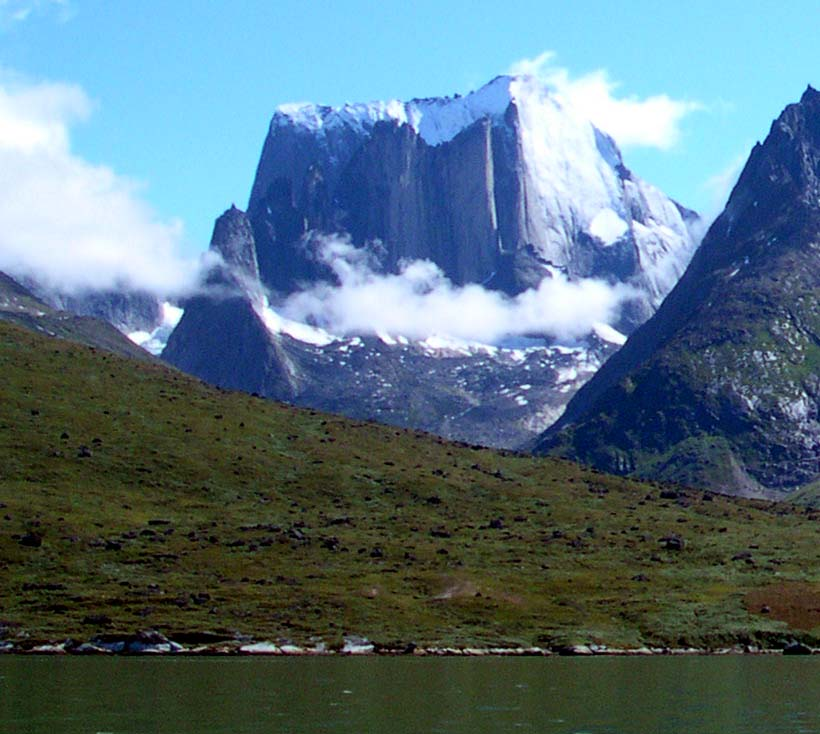
The West Face of Nalumasortoq seen from the fjord.

== Tourism ==
This fjord attracts climbers, kayakers, and trekkers, and is famous for its mountains and challenging rock faces. Many mountaineering expeditions have come to Tasermiut Fjord because of the challenge of peaks and the possibility of new climbing routes. As well as climbing, Tasermiut is used as a starting point for challenging treks to Kangikitsoq, Kangerdluk, Herjofsnaes, and Stordalen Havn.

Tasermiut Fjord can be accessed by short boat journey from Nanortalik, which is the southernmost major settlement in Greenland, with a population of around 1000 people.

== See also ==
- List of fjords of Greenland
