= Alleruusakasiit =

Mountain in Greenland

- Agdlerussakasit
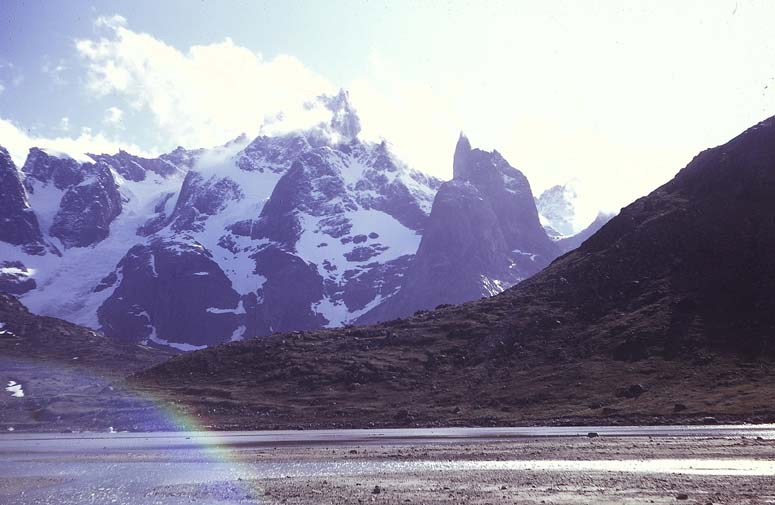
- View of Stordalen Havn in Torsukattak Fjord with the Alleruusakasiit in the background

Highest point
- Elevation: 1,743.7 m (5,721 ft)
- Coordinates: 60°8′8″N 44°31′44″W

Geography
- Location within Greenland
- Location: Kujalleq, Greenland

Alleruusakasiit, former spelling Agdlerussakasit, is a mountain in the Kujalleq municipality, southern Greenland.

== Geography ==
This mountain is a 1,743.7 m high largely unglaciated rocky summit rising 2.8 km west of the shore of Torsukattak Fjord located across the valley south of Angiartarfik.

Alleruusakasiit is famous for its massive eastern cliff, known as the Thumbnail.

== See also ==
- Big wall climbing
- List of mountains in Greenland
