= Ulamertorsuaq =

Mountain in Greenland

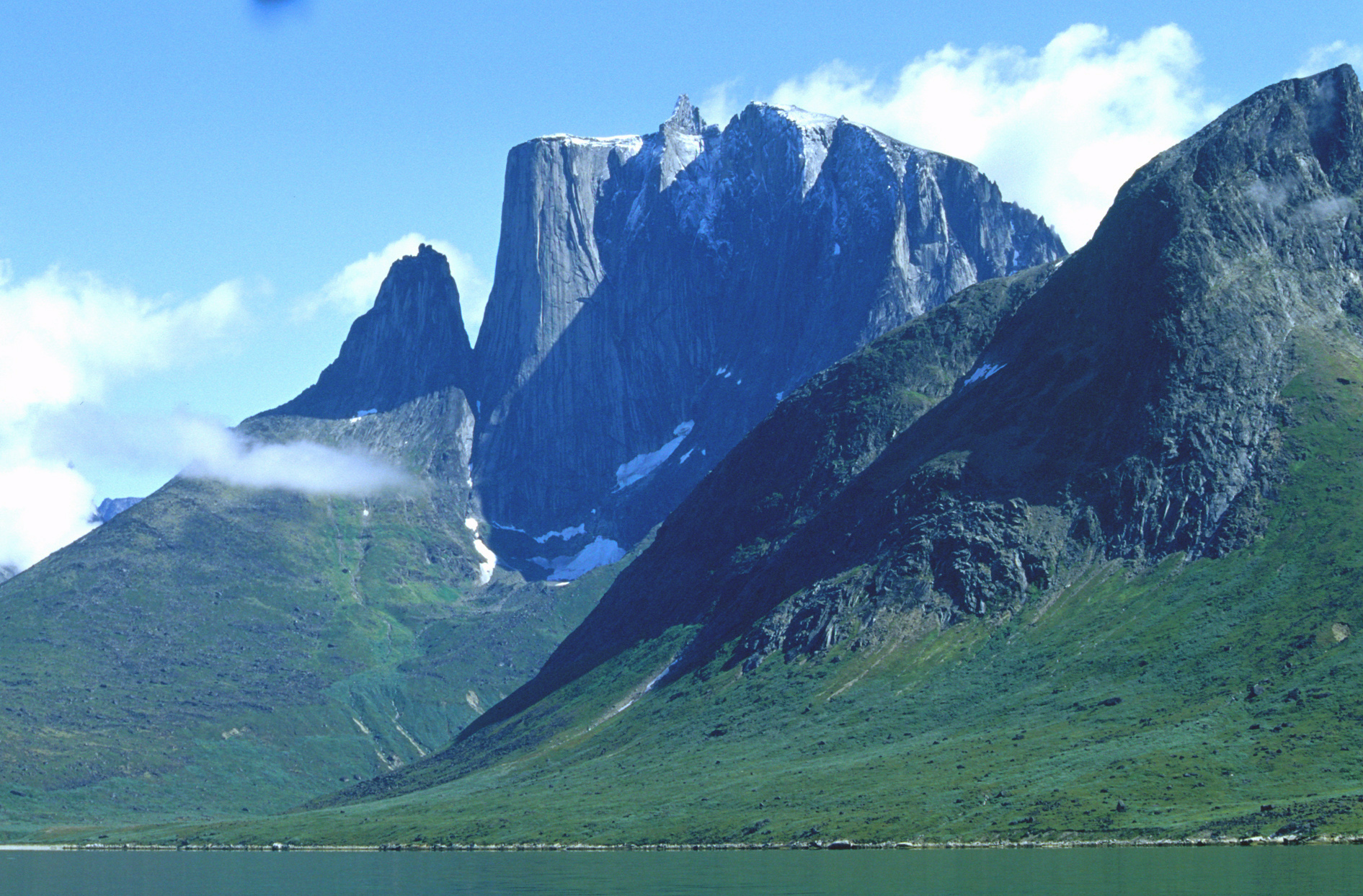

Highest point
- Elevation: 1,858 m (6,096 ft)
- Listing: List of mountains in Greenland
- Coordinates: 60°22′35″N 44°32′32″W

Geography
- Location within Greenland
- Location: Kujalleq, Greenland

Climbing
- First ascent: 1977

The Ulamertorsuaq is a 1,858 m–high mountain in southern Greenland, in the Kujalleq municipality.

== Geography ==
Together with Nalumasortoq and Ketil, this mountain rises in the mountainous peninsula of the mainland which forms the eastern side of the Tasermiut Fjord.

The Ulamertorsuaq has four peaks with heights of 1858 m, 1843 m, 1829 m and 1825 m. The 1843 m high peak is a popular mountain among climbers because of its challenging West Side, a mighty perpendicular cliff. It is also favoured for its firm granite structure, similar to other summits in the region such as Ketil and Napasorsuaq, the latter located on the other side of the Tasermiut Fjord.

== See also ==
- Big wall climbing
- List of mountains in Greenland

== Bibliography ==
- Greenland Tourism: Hiking Map South Greenland/Tasermiut fjorden – Nanortalik. 1996
