= Torsukattak Fjord =

Fjord in far southern Greenland

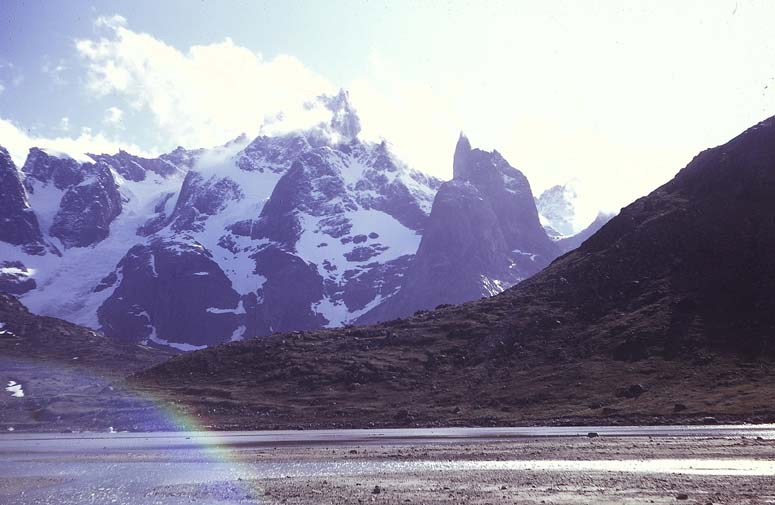
- View of Stordalen Havn within the fjord and the Agdlerussakasit looming in the background

- Location in Greenland
- Location: Arctic
- Coordinates: 60°3′N 44°29′W
- Ocean/sea sources: Labrador Sea
- Basin countries: Greenland
- Max. length: 30 km (19 mi)
- Max. width: 2.7 km (1.7 mi)

Torsukattak is a fjord in far southern Greenland. Administratively it is part of the Kujalleq municipality.

== Geography ==
Torsukattak Fjord

Torsukattak Fjord is located to the southwest of Prince Christian Sound near the Cape Farewell Archipelago. The fjord is oriented in a roughly north–south direction and in the south it opens into the Labrador Sea of the North Atlantic Ocean. It separates large Pamialluk Island in the east from the mainland to the west of the fjord. Stordalen Havn is located at the bend 20 km into the fjord where it bends to the east for 7 km and connects with the Qoornoq Strait and the Ilua Fjord of the Prince Christian Sound system.

The islands of Sullat and Nunarsuaq —the latter rising to a height of 939 m— lie at the mouth of the fjord. There are further smaller islands near them.

== Bibliography ==
- Ivar Haug (2005). Gazetteer of Greenland UBiT (Trondheim University Library), ISBN 82-7113-114-1

== See also ==
- List of fjords of Greenland
