= Notch Peak =

Mountain in Utah, United States

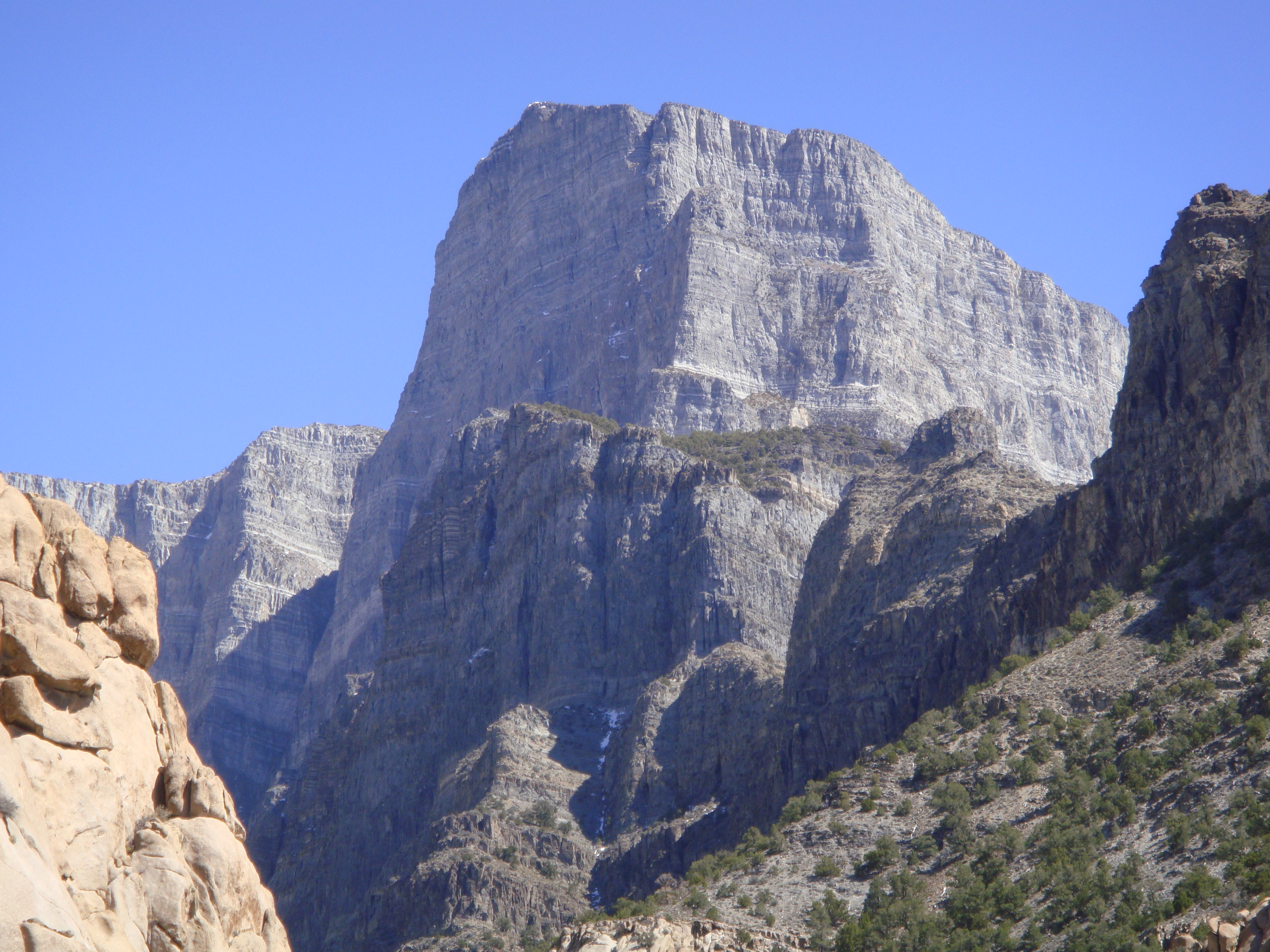
- Notch Peak, from the canyon below the notch

Highest point
- Elevation: 9,658 ft (2,944 m) NAVD 88
- Prominence: 3,414 ft (1,041 m)
- Listing: Great Basin Peaks List
- Coordinates: 39°08′36″N 113°24′34″W

Geography
- Location within Utah
- Location: Millard County, Utah, U.S.
- Parent range: House Range
- Topo map: USGS Notch Peak

Climbing
- Easiest route: Hike

Notch Peak is a distinctive summit located on Sawtooth Mountain in the House Range, west of Delta, Utah, United States. The peak and the surrounding area are part of the Notch Peak Wilderness Study Area (WSA). Bristlecone pines, estimated to be 3,000 to 4,000 years old, are located on the ridges surrounding Notch Peak.

== The Cliff ==
Notch Peak is one of the highest peaks in the House Range, reaching 9,658 feet (2,944 m) NAVD 88. The northwest face of the mountain is a massive carbonate rock (limestone and dolomite) cliff with 2,200 feet (670 m) of vertical rise, making it among the highest cliff faces in North America. Overall, the summit rises about 4,450 feet (1,360 m) above Tule Valley.

It is the second-highest pure vertical drop in the United States after El Capitan. as well as the highest carbonate rock cliff in North America.

== Recreation ==
One of the more popular uses of the area is the hike to Notch Peak so you can look down the notch in person. The summit can be reached by following a trail from the east side of the mountain in Sawtooth Canyon. The hike is about 7.5 miles round trip (12 km), with 2,600 feet (790 m) elevation gain.

=== Climbing ===
The north face of Notch Peak is divided by a large shelf into an upper and lower wall. There are several big wall climbing routes on the limestone cliffs. The Swiss Route (never repeated), Direct North West Ridge (or Pillars of Faith), and Book of Saturdays ascend the upper wall. On the lower wall Appetite for Destruction and Western Hardman at over 900 feet (270 meters) of vertical height. Climbing on all of these routes is adventurous with rockfall hazards and loose flakes of widely varying sizes.

== Geology ==
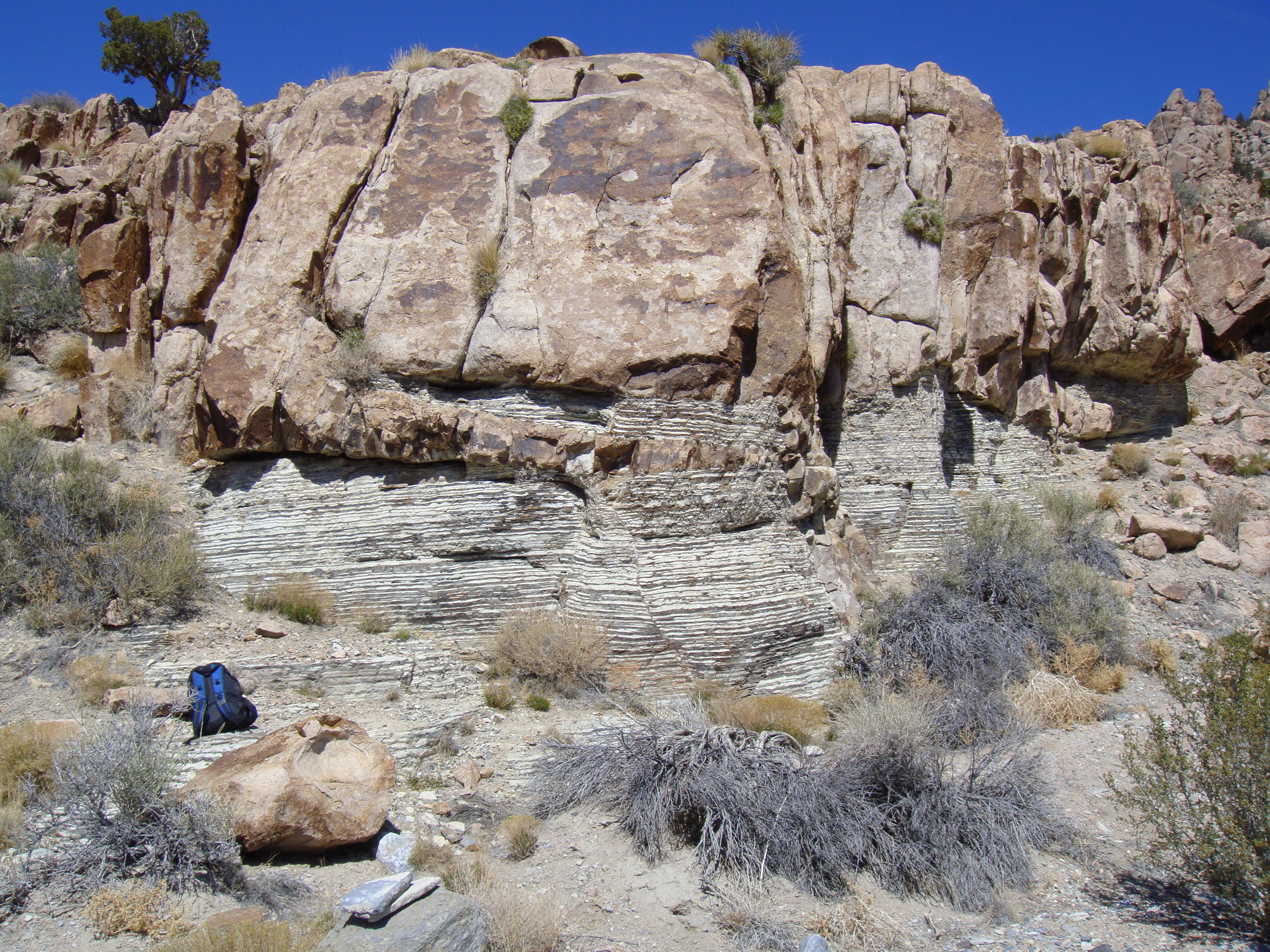
An intrusion (Notch Peak monzonite) inter-fingers (partly as a dike) with highly metamorphosed host rock (Cambrian carbonate rocks). From the canyon below the notch, near Notch Peak.

This part of the House Range is chiefly made up of a passive margin sequence of Cambrian to Ordovician carbonate rocks. The top of the range is the type section for the aptly named Notch Peak Dolomite. At the base of the range is the pink/orange Notch Peak granite and monzonite, which is Jurassic in age (143 to 169 million years old). Around Notch Peak, especially from the west side (Tule Valley side), white Lake Bonneville fossiliferous marls occur.

Because of the intrusion, a hike up the canyon below the notch can clearly show a well-developed metamorphic (contact) aureole and even inter-fingering textures between the intrusion and the bedrock. Also, small quantities of tungsten and placer gold have been found around the Notch Peak area.

== Gallery ==
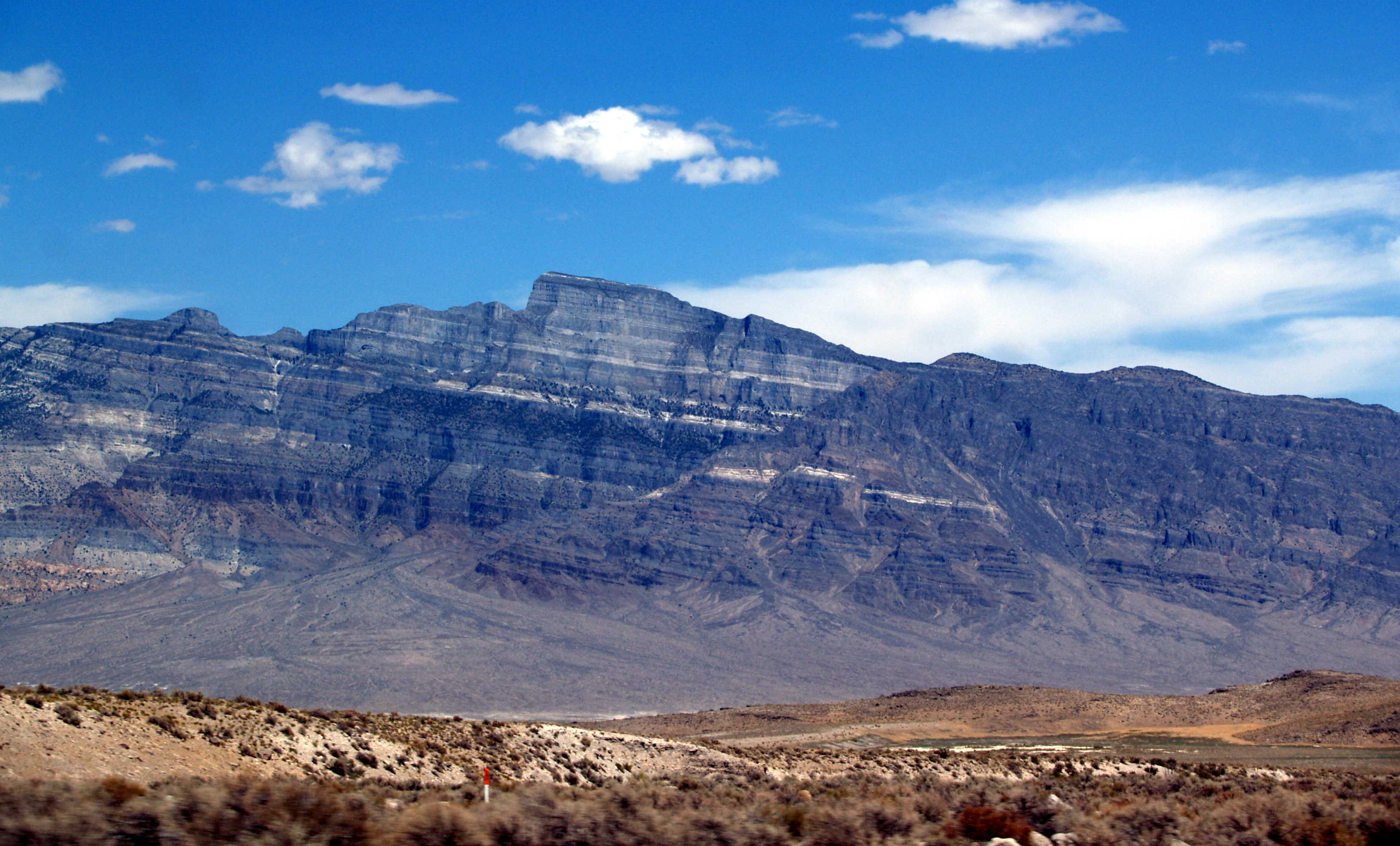
Notch Peak as seen from the southwest on the Tule Valley floor.

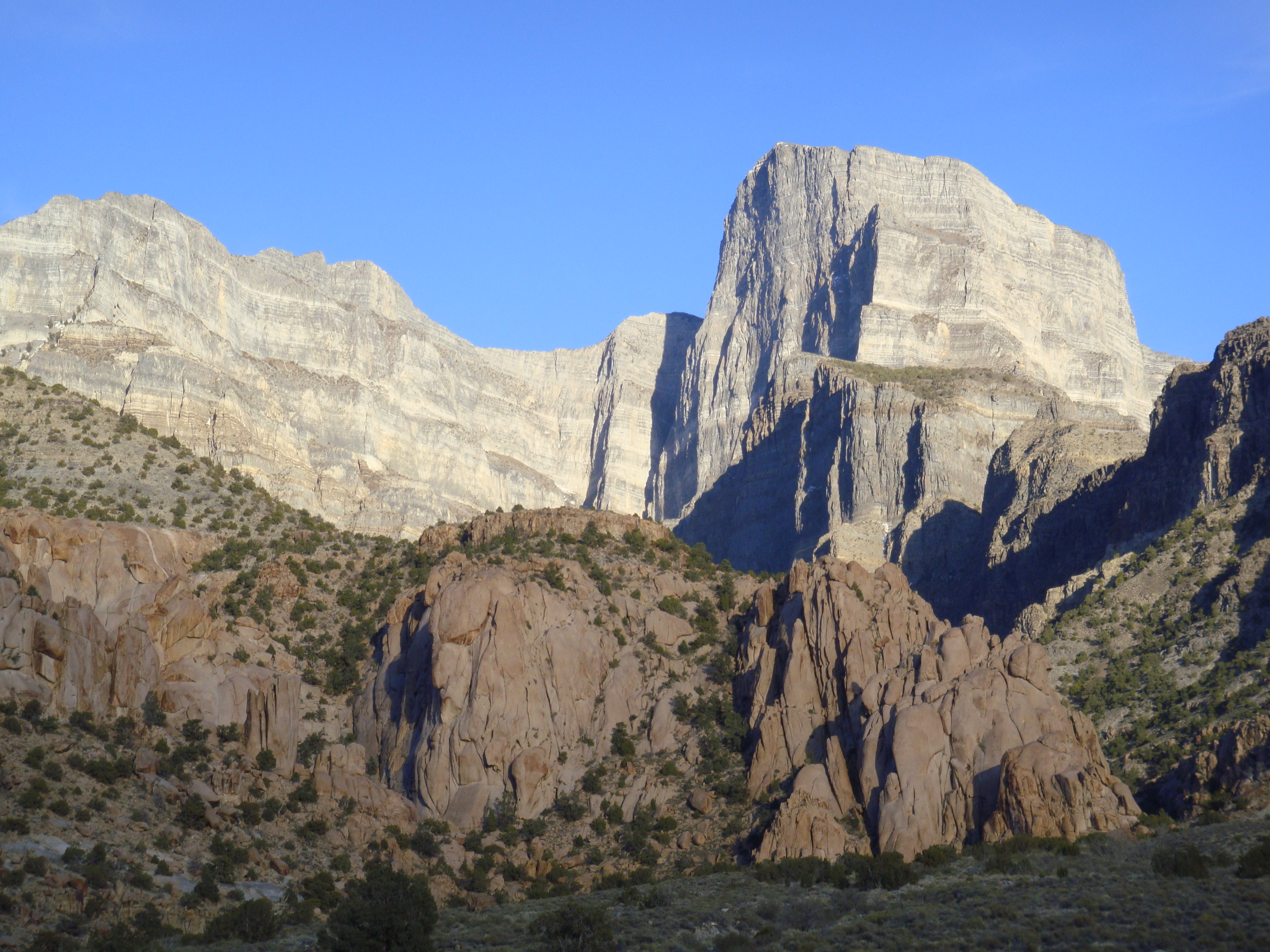
Notch Peak sunset.

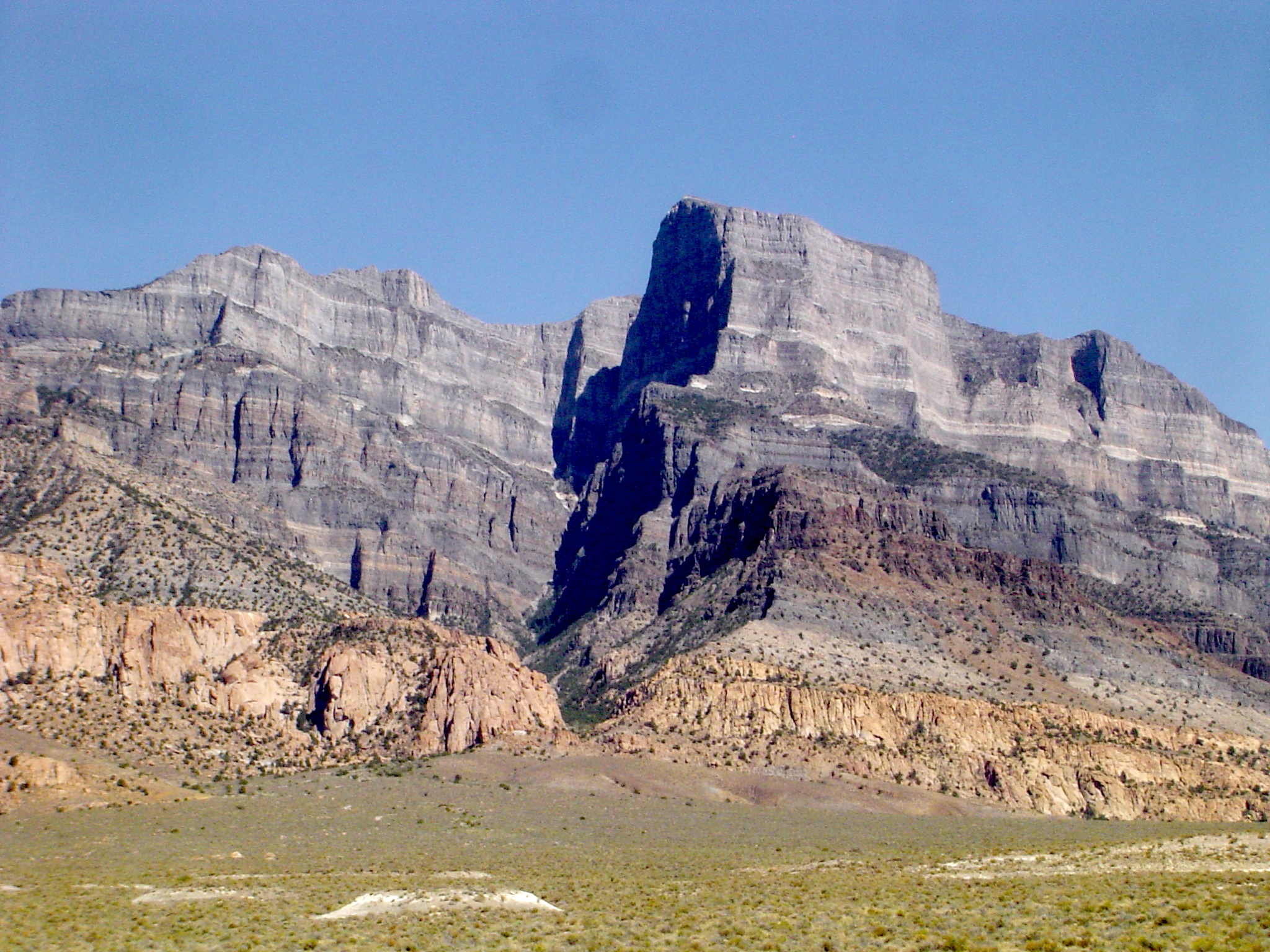
Grey carbonate rocks, pink monzonite, white marl

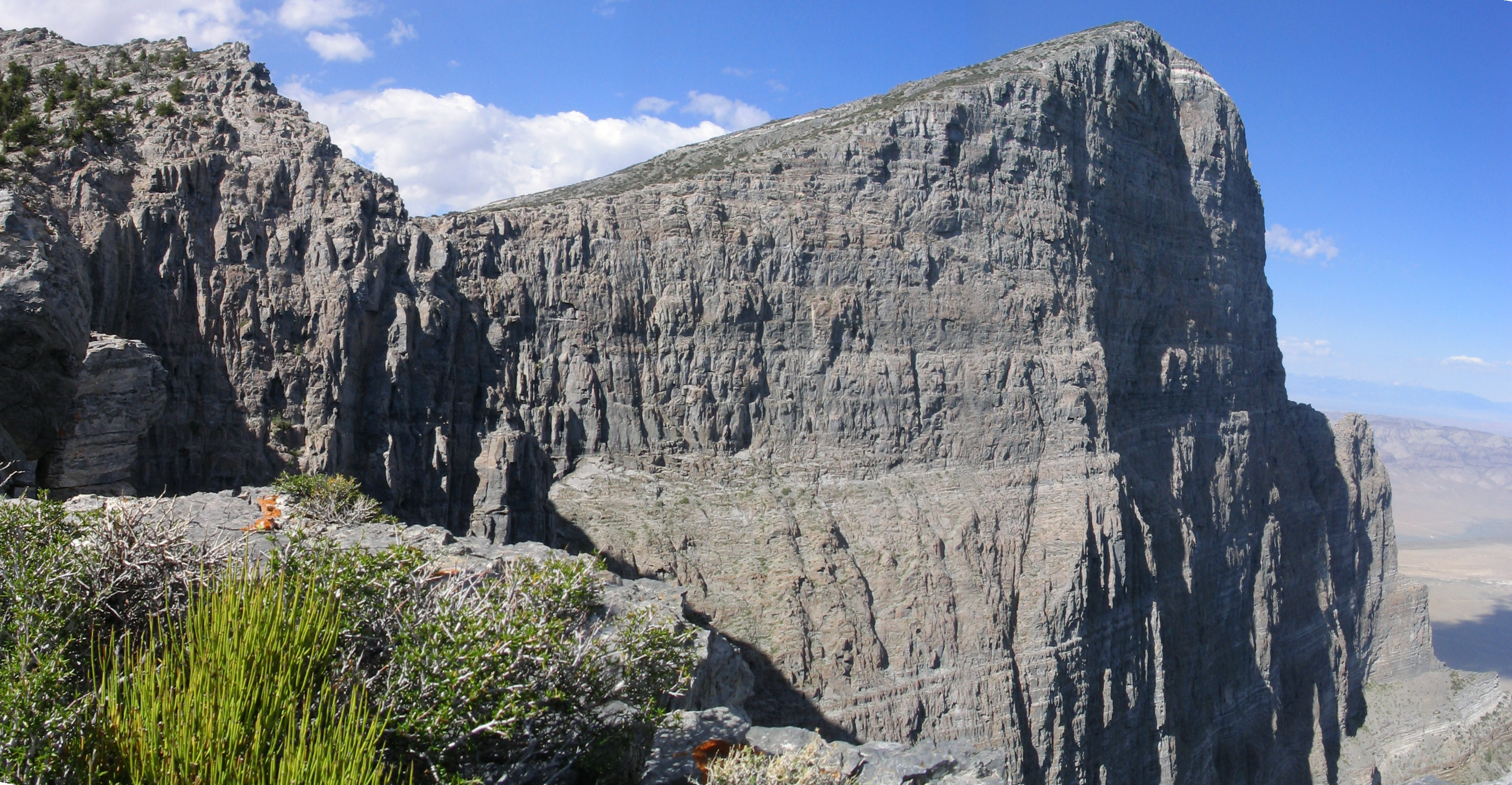
Notch Peak in 2004.
