= Ketil (mountain) =

Mountain in Greenland

- Uiluit Qaqqaa
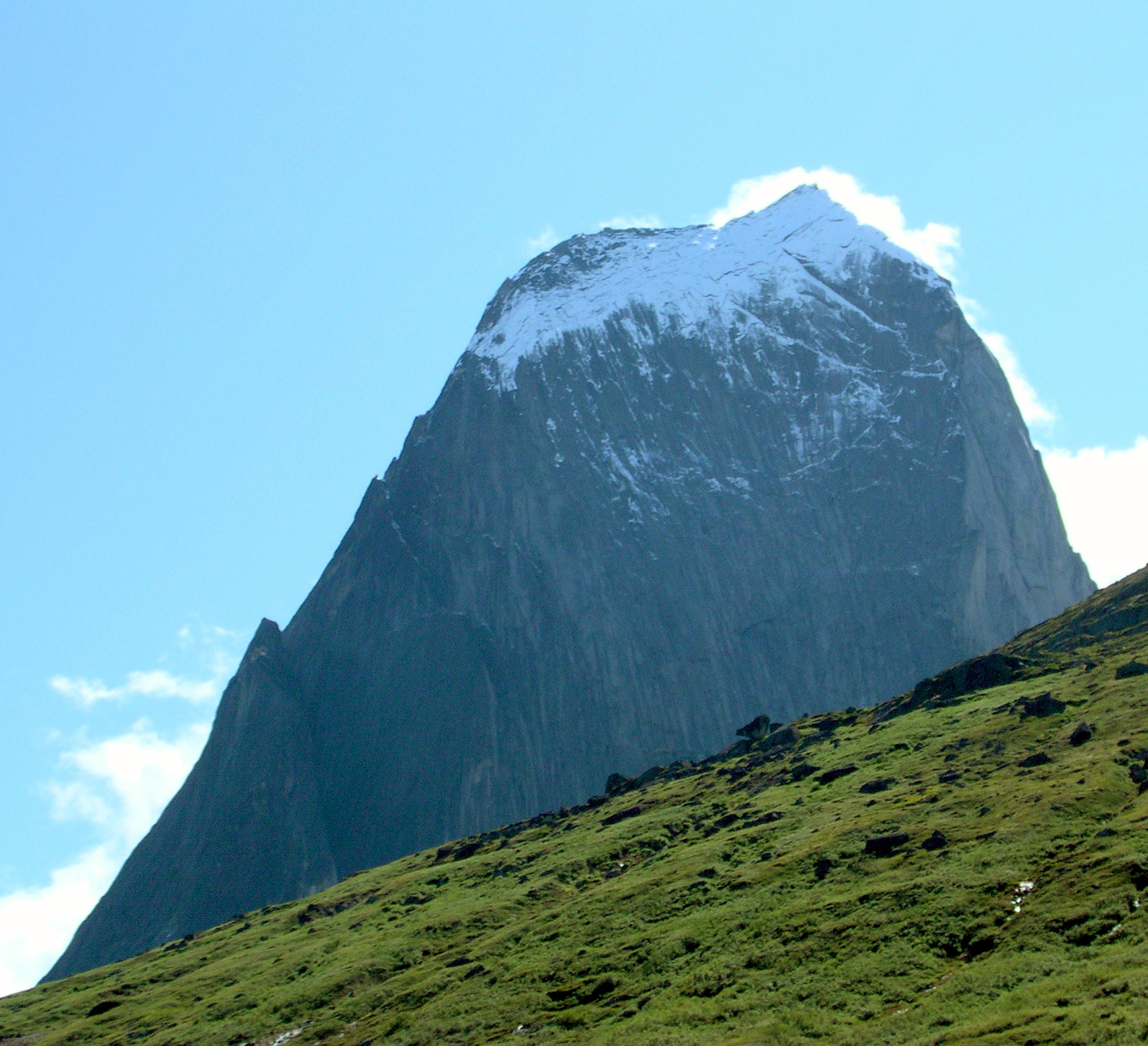
- Ketil's mighty West Wall

Highest point
- Elevation: 2,010 m (6,590 ft)
- Listing: List of mountains in Greenland
- Coordinates: 60°24′59″N 44°30′44″W

Geography
- Location within Greenland
- Location: Kujalleq, Greenland

Climbing
- First ascent: 1974

The Ketil (Greenlandic: Uiluit Qaqqaa, meaning "Shell Mountain") is a 2,010 m–high mountain in southern Greenland, in the Kujalleq municipality.

Ketil's granite walls are similar to Tiningnertok's (Apostelen Tommelfinger), another massive peak in the east coast.

== Geography ==
Together with Nalumasortoq and Ulamertorsuaq, Ketil is part of the group of three massive largely unglaciated rocky mountains rising in the peninsula of the mainland which forms the eastern side of the Tasermiut Fjord.

In the same manner as its slightly lower neighbour Ulamertorsuaq, Ketil has become popular among mountain climbers owing to its higher than 1000 m sheer western granite wall. It is considered one of the most challenging Big Walls on Earth.

This mountain is marked as a 2,003-metre-high (6,572 ft) peak in some sources.

== See also ==
- Big wall climbing
- List of mountains in Greenland

== Bibliography ==
- Greenland Tourism: Hiking Map South Greenland/Tasermiut fjorden – Nanortalik. 1996
