= Thumbnail (cliff) =

Cliff in Greenland

Coordinates: 60.110°N 44.498°W

Thumbnail sea cliff

The Thumbnail is a sea cliff in Kujalleq, South Greenland.

== Geography ==
It is located in Cape Farewell region, ca. 50 km to the east from the town of Nanortalik, over the west side of Torssukátak Fjord (also known as Torssukátak Sound) between the mainland and Pamiagdluk Island. It belongs to the Maujit Qaqarssuasia (Qoqarssuasia) massif, and is 1560 m a.s.l. on its eastern flank. The nearest peak dominating the neighboring ridge is Agdlerussakasit (1760 or 1706 m a.s.l.) and some of the reports on the climbs on the cliff also refer to this summit's name.

== Ascents ==
In 2000, 2003 and 2007 there were established 4 climbing routes on the east face, all starting from the sea. The hardest one is the earliest, British route, established in the steepest, right-hand part of the face in 2000 and graded as English E6, 6b or American 5.12c. The route finishes on the subsidiary top/outcrop (which was in 2000 called as Thumbnail itself) and has altitude approximated by altimeter as 1350 meters a.s.l. (originally 4490 ft, see references, AAJ 2001, pp. 64 and 70).
