= Aappilattoq =

Aappilattoq may refer to the following places in Greenland:

== Islands ==
- Aappilattoq Island (Tasiusaq Bay), an uninhabited island in the Upernavik Archipelago in northwestern Greenland
- Aappilattoq Island (Upernavik Icefjord), an island in the Upernavik Archipelago in northwestern Greenland, home to the settlement of Aappilattoq, Avannaata

== Settlements ==
- Aappilattoq, Kujalleq, a settlement in the Kujalleq municipality in southern Greenland
- Aappilattoq, Avannaata, a settlement in the Avannaata municipality in northwestern Greenland
