= Aappilattoq Heliport =

Aappilattoq Heliport may refer to:

- Aappilattoq Heliport (Kujalleq), IATA QUV, Heliport in Greenland
- Aappilattoq Heliport (Avannaata), IATA AOQ, Heliport in Greenland
