= BGET =

BGET may refer to:

- Bord Gáis Energy Theatre, Dublin
- BGET, the ICAO airport code for Eqalugaarsuit Heliport
