= QFG =

QFG may refer to:

- Quest for Glory, an adventure RPG video game series
  - Quest for Glory: So You Want to Be a Hero, the first game of the series
- QFG, a signal in Q code for "Am I overheard?"
- The IATA code for Eqalugaarsuit Heliport
- "Qualified For Gold Medal Game" in sporting events where medals are awarded
