= QUV =

QUV may refer to:

- quv, the ISO 639-3 code for the Sakapultek language
- Aappilattoq Heliport (Kujalleq), the IATA code QUV
