= Tasiusaq Heliport (Kujalleq) =

Heliport in Greenland

- IATA: XEQ; ICAO: BGTQ

Summary
- Airport type: Public
- Operator: Greenland Airport Authority (Mittarfeqarfiit)
- Serves: Tasiusaq, Greenland
- Elevation AMSL: 21 ft / 6 m
- Coordinates: 60°11′38″N 044°48′42″W
- Website: Tasiusaq Heliport

Map
- Location in Greenland

Helipads
Number	Length		Surface
Number	m	ft	Surface
1	15	49	Gravel
- Source: Danish AIS

Tasiusaq Heliport (IATA: XEQ, ICAO: BGTQ) is a heliport in Tasiusaq, a village in the Kujalleq municipality in southern Greenland. The heliport is considered a helistop, and is served by Air Greenland as part of a government contract.

There is also a heliport with the same name located in the village of Tasiusaq in Avannaata municipality in northwestern Greenland.

== Airlines and destinations ==
Airlines	Destinations
Air Greenland (settlement flights)	Aappilattoq, Nanortalik

Air Greenland operates government contract flights to villages in the Nanortalik area. These mostly cargo flights are not featured in the timetable, although they can be pre-booked. Departure times for these flights as specified during booking are by definition approximate, with the settlement service optimized on the fly depending on local demand for a given day.
