= LLU =

LLU is a three-letter abbreviation which may refer to the following:

- Alluitsup Paa Heliport (IATA airport code), in Alluitsup Paa, Greenland
- Latvia University of Life Sciences and Technologies (Latvian: Latvijas Lauksaimniecības Universitāte), a public university in Latvia
- Local-loop unbundling, in telecommunications regulation
- Loma Linda University, a religious university in California, USA
- long long unsigned, an integer data type, used in programming e.g. within a printf statement ("%llu")
