= Eqalugaarsuit Heliport =

- IATA: QFG; ICAO: BGET

Summary
- Airport type: Public
- Operator: Greenland Airport Authority (Mittarfeqarfiit)
- Serves: Eqalugaarsuit, Greenland
- Elevation AMSL: 9 ft / 3 m
- Coordinates: 60°37′11″N 045°55′02″W
- Website: Eqalugaarsuit Heliport

Map
- Location in Greenland

Helipads
Number	Length		Surface
Number	m	ft	Surface
1	30 × 20	98 × 66	Gravel
- Source: Danish AIS

Eqalugaarsuit Heliport (IATA: QFG, ICAO: BGET) is a heliport in Eqalugaarsuit, a village in the Kujalleq municipality in southern Greenland. The heliport is considered a helistop, and is served by Air Greenland as part of a government contract.

== Airlines and destinations ==
Airlines	Destinations
Air Greenland (settlement flights)	Aappilattoq, Nanortalik

Air Greenland operates government contract flights to villages in the Nanortalik region. These mostly cargo flights are not featured in the timetable, although they can be pre-booked. Departure times for these flights as specified during booking are by definition approximate, with the settlement service optimized on the fly depending on local demand for a given day.
