= Alluitsup Paa Heliport =

Heliport in Greenland

- IATA: LLU; ICAO: BGAP

Summary
- Airport type: Public
- Operator: Greenland Airport Authority (Mittarfeqarfiit)
- Serves: Alluitsup Paa, Greenland
- Elevation AMSL: 89 ft / 27 m
- Coordinates: 60°27′52″N 045°34′09″W
- Website: Alluitsup Paa Heliport

Map
- Location in Greenland

Helipads
Number	Length		Surface
Number	m	ft	Surface
1	9	30	Asphalt
- Source: Danish AIS

Alluitsup Paa Heliport (IATA: LLU, ICAO: BGAP) is a heliport in the northern part of Alluitsup Paa, a village in the Kujalleq municipality in southern Greenland. It is located about 300 m (980 ft) from the village centre.

== Airlines and destinations ==
Airlines	Destinations
Air Greenland	Nanortalik, Qaqortoq
