= Nanortalik Heliport =

Heliport in Greenland

- IATA: JNN; ICAO: BGNN

Summary
- Airport type: Public
- Operator: Greenland Airport Authority (Mittarfeqarfiit)
- Serves: Nanortalik, Greenland
- Elevation AMSL: 17 ft / 5 m
- Coordinates: 60°08′24″N 045°13′54″W
- Website: Nanortalik Heliport

Map
- Location in Greenland

Helipads
Number	Length		Surface
Number	m	ft	Surface
1	9 × 9	30 × 30	Asphalt
- Source: Danish AIS

Nanortalik Heliport (IATA: JNN, ICAO: BGNN) is a heliport in the eastern part of Nanortalik, a town in the Kujalleq municipality in southern Greenland.

== Airlines and destinations ==
Airlines	Destinations
Air Greenland	Alluitsup Paa, Qaqortoq
Air Greenland (settlement flights)	Aappilattoq, Ammassivik, Narsarmijit, Tasiusaq (Kujalleq)

Air Greenland operates government contract flights to villages in the Nanortalik region. These mostly cargo flights are not featured in the timetable, although they can be pre-booked. Departure times for these flights as specified during booking are by definition approximate, with the settlement service optimized on the fly depending on local demand for a given day.
