= Air Alpha Greenland =

| IATA | ICAO | Call sign |
|---|---|---|
| GD | AHA | AIR ALPHA |
- Founded: 1994
- Ceased operations: 2006
- Hubs: Ilulissat Airport, AGM & CNP
- Focus cities: Ilulissat, Tasiilaq, Constable Pynt
- Fleet size: 4
- Parent company: Air Alpha (Odense)
- Headquarters: Ilulissat, Greenland

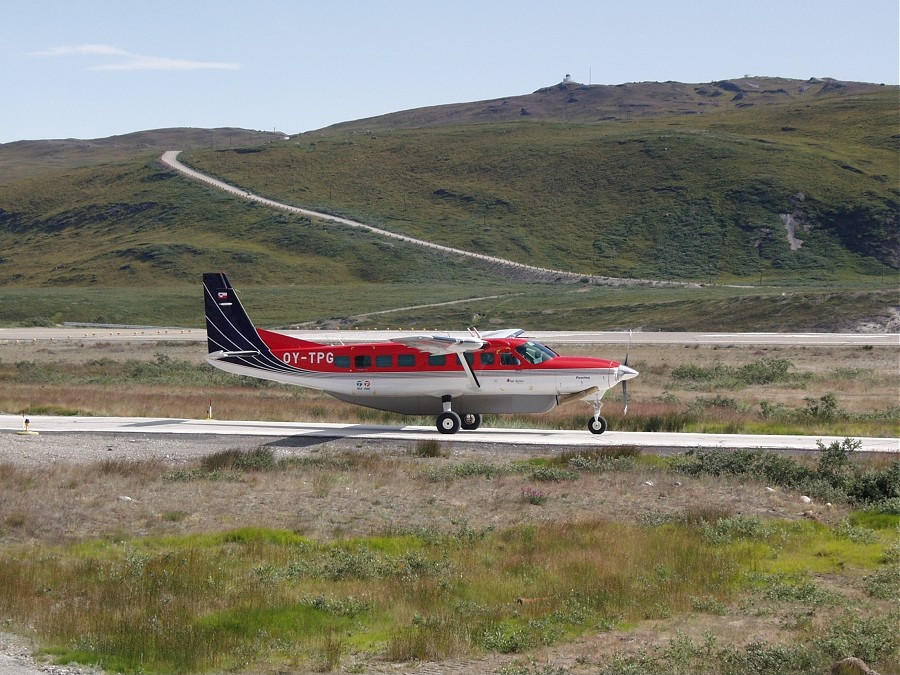
Air Alpha Cessna 208B Grand Caravan at Kangerlussuaq Airport

Air Alpha Greenland was a subsidiary of Air Alpha, an aircraft company based in Odense, Denmark. Air Alpha Greenland operated flights in Greenland from Ilulissat. The subsidiary was founded in 1994. On 28 July 2006, it was sold to Air Greenland.

== Fleet ==
- 6 Bell 222
- 1 Bell 206 LongRanger
- 1 Eurocopter AS350B3
- 2 Cessna 208B Grand Caravan
