= Aappilattoq Island (Upernavik Icefjord) =

Island in Avannaata, Greenland

Aappilattoq
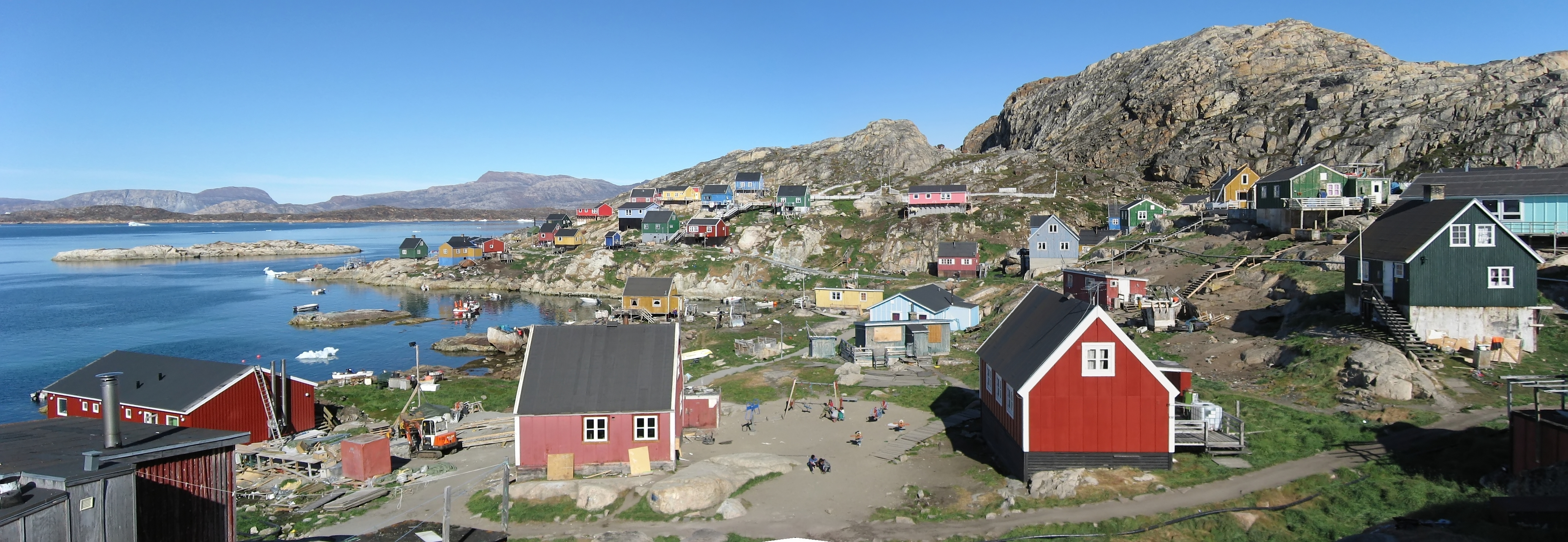
- Aappilattoq settlement on Aappilattoq Island

- Location within Greenland

Geography
- Location: Greenland
- Coordinates: 72°51′N 55°27′W
- Archipelago: Upernavik Archipelago

Administration
- Greenland
- Municipality: Avannaata

Aappilattoq Island (old spelling: Augpilagtoq) is an island in Avannaata municipality in northwestern Greenland. It is one of two islands of the same name in the Upernavik Archipelago.

== Geography ==
Aappilattoq Island is located in the southern part of Upernavik Archipelago. It forms part of the chain of islands bounding Upernavik Icefjord from the south. The island is separated by inner waterways of Baffin Bay from the large Nutaarmiut Island in the southeast, from Nunaa Island in the south, and from Ammaussarsuaq Island in the southeast.

The highest point on the island is the 490 m (1,610 ft) Paatuup Qaqqaa mountain in the central part of the island. The coastline of the island is complicated, with the island nearly in two rocky parts, with only a small isthmus joining the halves.

== Settlement ==
The island is home to the Aappilattoq settlement of 180 people. The settlement is located on the northwestern tip of the island.
