= Jettime =

Danish charter airline

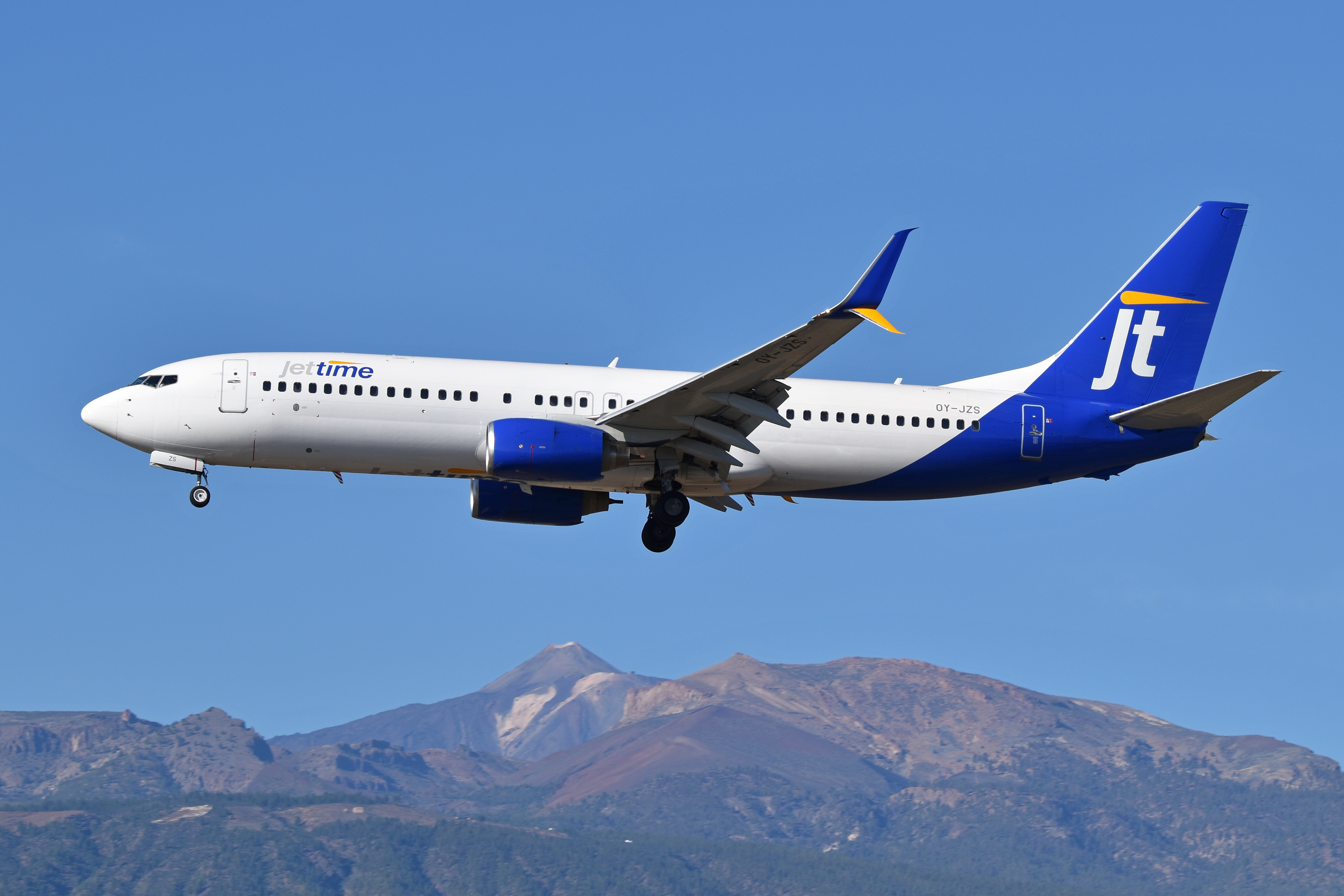
- Boeing 737-800
IATA	ICAO	Call sign
JP	JTD	JETTIME
- Founded: September 2006 (as Jet Time); 8 June 2020 (as Jettime)
- Commenced operations: 19 September 2006 (as Jet Time); July 2021 (as Jettime)
- AOC #: DK.AOC.085
- Operating bases: Billund Airport; Copenhagen Airport; Helsinki Airport
- Fleet size: 13
- Destinations: 61
- Headquarters: Kastrup, Denmark
- Key people: Jørgen Holme (CEO)
- Website: https://jettime.com/

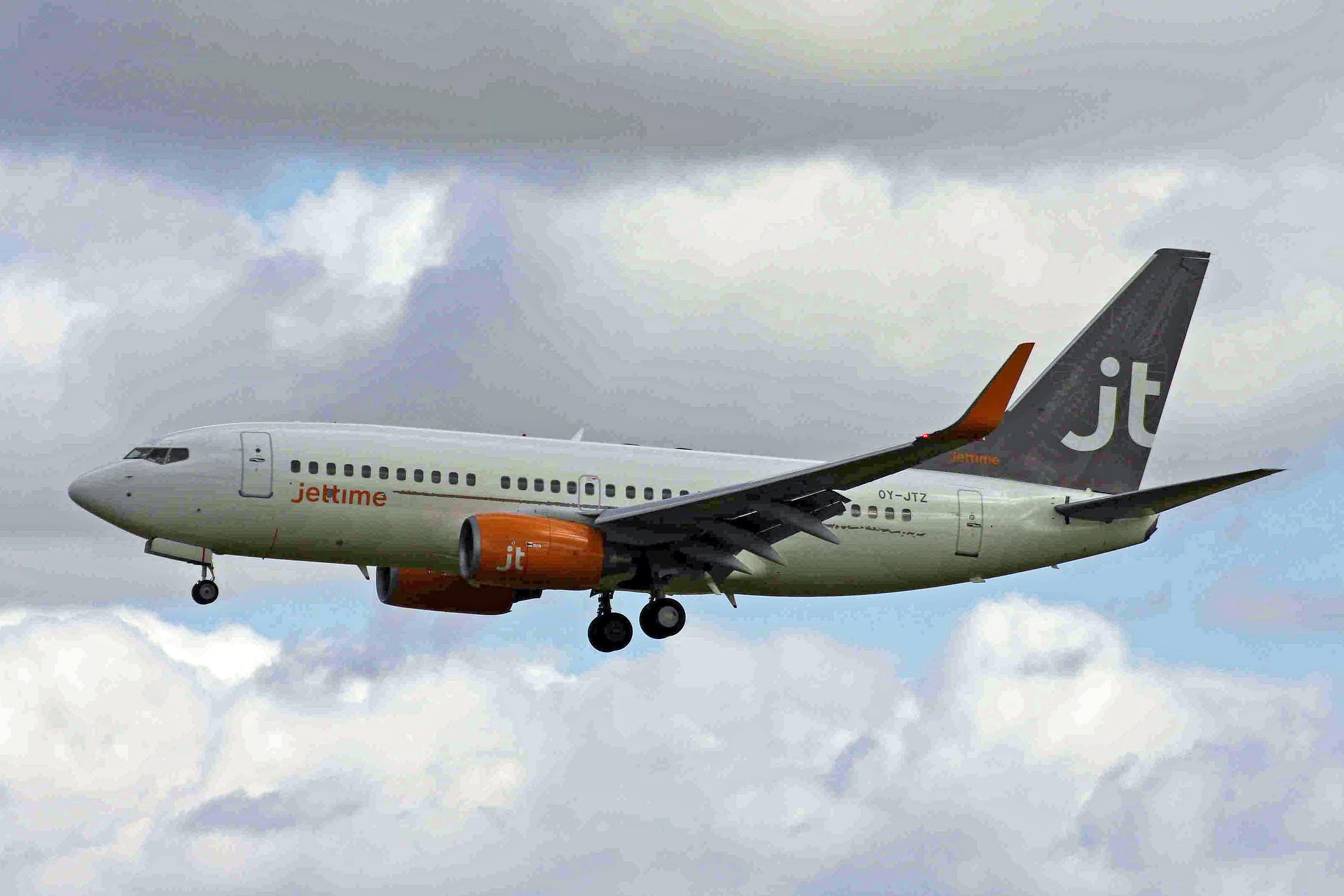
Jet Time Boeing 737-700

Jettime A/S, previously known as Jet Time, is a Danish charter airline with headquarters in Kastrup, Tårnby Municipality, and its main base at Copenhagen Airport.

== History ==
The airline was originally founded as Jet Time by a group of Danish investors, and operated its first flight on 19 September 2006.

In November 2016, it was announced that Scandinavian Airlines would end the contract for Jet Time's operation of eight ATR 72-600s on SAS behalf in early 2017; SAS wanted to operate larger aircraft even in regional routes. Subsequently, Jet Time had phased out the relatively new ATR aircraft.

The airline announced that it had filed for bankruptcy on 21 July 2020, after having discharged most of its employees in June due to the COVID-19 pandemic. However the airline expected to resume operations following the pandemic as a restructured company, which was established on 8 June 2020 with the slightly similar name Jettime. Jet Time's assets were also transferred to Jettime, including the CEO, a number of key employees, and five of Jet Time's Boeing 737 aircraft, for operations planned to resume by 2022. A new, separate air operator's certificate was subsequently issued to the airline, and operations resumed in July 2021.

== Destinations ==
Jet Time has operated charter flights to destinations including the following:

Country or Territory	City	Airport	Notes
Albania	Tirana	Tirana International Airport Nënë Tereza	
Austria	Innsbruck	Innsbruck Airport	
Austria	Salzburg	Salzburg Airport	
Bulgaria	Bourgas	Bourgas Airport	
Bulgaria	Varna	Varna Airport	
Croatia	Dubrovnik	Dubrovnik Airport	
Croatia	Split	Split Airport	
Cyprus	Larnaca	Larnaca Airport	
Denmark	Aalborg	Aalborg Airport	
Denmark	Aarhus	Aarhus Airport	
Denmark	Billund	Billund Airport	Base
Denmark	Copenhagen	Copenhagen Airport	base
Egypt	Hurghada	Hurghada Airport	
Finland	Helsinki	Helsinki Airport	Base
Finland	Tampere	Tampere Airport	
Finland	Vaasa	Vaasa Airport	
Finland	Oulu	Oulu Airport	
France	Chambéry	Chambéry Airport	
France	Grenoble	Grenoble Airport	
Greece	Chania	Chania Airport	
Greece	Corfu	Corfu Airport	
Greece	Heraklion	Heraklion Airport	
Greece	Kavala	Kavala Airport	
Greece	Karpathos	Karpathos Island National Airport	
Greece	Kefalonia	Kefalonia Airport	
Greece	Kos	Kos Airport	
Greece	Rhodes	Rhodes International Airport	
Greece	Samos	Samos International Airport	
Greece	Skiathos	Skiathos Airport	
Greenland	Kangerlussuaq	Kangerlussuaq Airport	
Greenland	Narsarsuaq	Narsarsuaq Airport	
Greenland	Nuuk	Nuuk Airport	
Montenegro	Tivat	Tivat Airport	
Norway	Bergen	Bergen Airport, Flesland	
Norway	Kristiansand	Kristiansand Airport, Kjevik	
Norway	Oslo	Oslo Airport, Gardermoen	
Norway	Stavanger	Stavanger Airport, Sola	
Norway	Tromsø	Tromsø Airport, Langnes	
Netherlands	Amsterdam	Amsterdam Airport Schiphol	
Portugal	Madeira	Madeira Airport	
Portugal	São Miguel Island	Ponta Delgada Airport	
Spain	Fuerteventura	Fuerteventura Airport	
Spain	Lanzarote	Lanzarote Airport	
Spain	Gran Canaria	Gran Canaria Airport	
Spain	Málaga	Málaga Airport	
Spain	Palma de Mallorca	Palma de Mallorca Airport	
Spain	Tenerife	Tenerife South Airport	
Sweden	Gothenburg	Göteborg Landvetter Airport	
Sweden	Halmstad	Halmstad Airport	
Sweden	Jönköping	Jönköping Airport	
Sweden	Kalmar	Kalmar Airport	
Sweden	Malmö	Malmö Airport	
Sweden	Luleå	Luleå Airport	
Sweden	Norrköping	Norrköping Airport	
Sweden	Örebro	Örebro Airport	
Sweden	Stockholm	Stockholm Arlanda Airport	
Sweden	Sundsvall	Sundsvall–Timrå Airport	
Sweden	Umeå	Umeå Airport	
Sweden	Växjö	Småland	
Turkey	Alanya	Gazipaşa Airport	
Turkey	Antalya	Antalya Airport	
Turkey	Dalaman	Dalaman Airport	
Turkey	Istanbul	Istanbul Airport	
Turkey	İzmir	İzmir Adnan Menderes Airport	
Turkey	Milas	Milas–Bodrum Airport	

== Fleet ==
=== Current fleet ===
As of July 2026, Jettime operates the following aircraft:

Jettime fleet
Aircraft	In service	Orders	Passengers	Notes
Boeing 737-800	13	—	189	
Total	13	-		

=== Former fleet ===
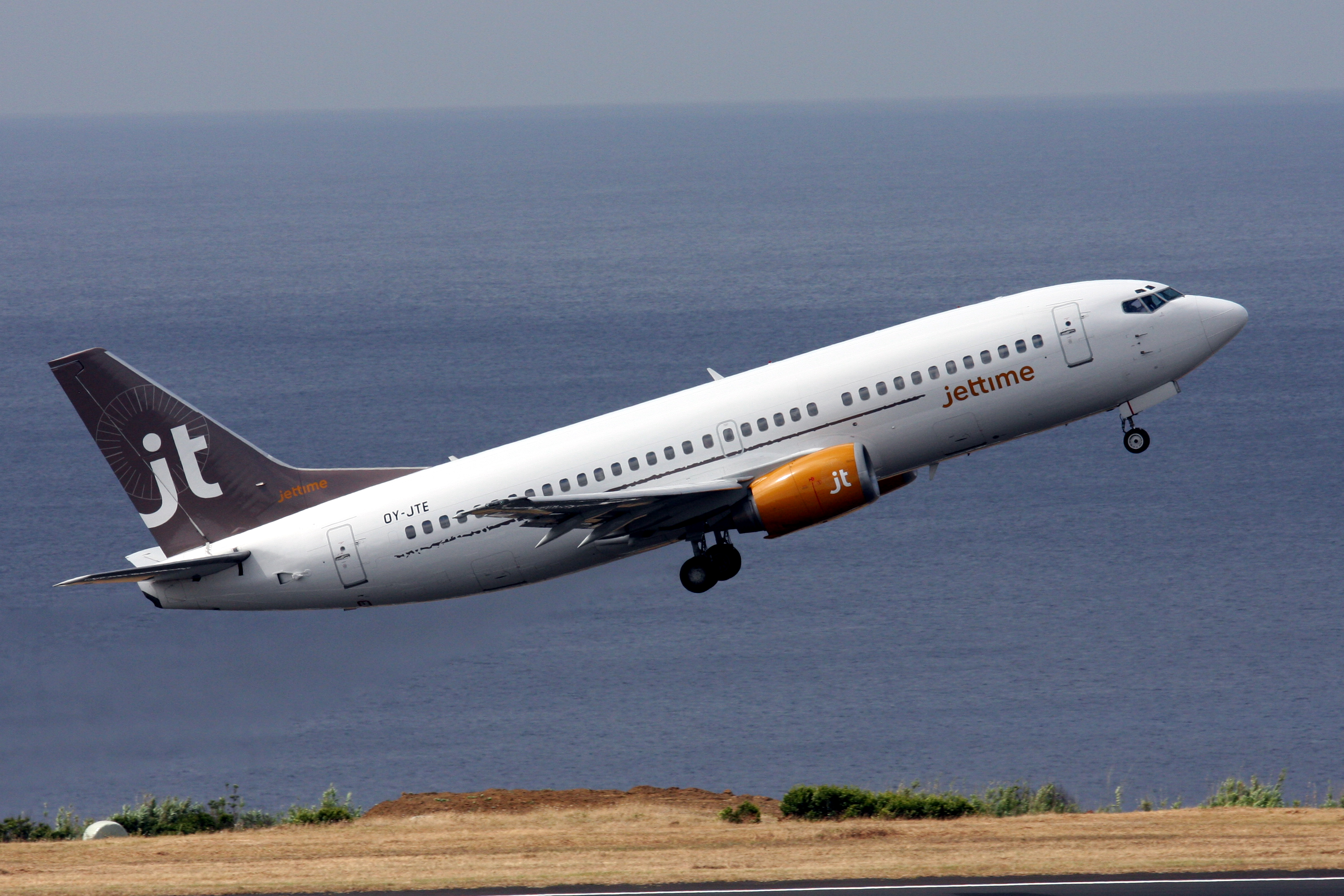
Jet Time Boeing 737-300

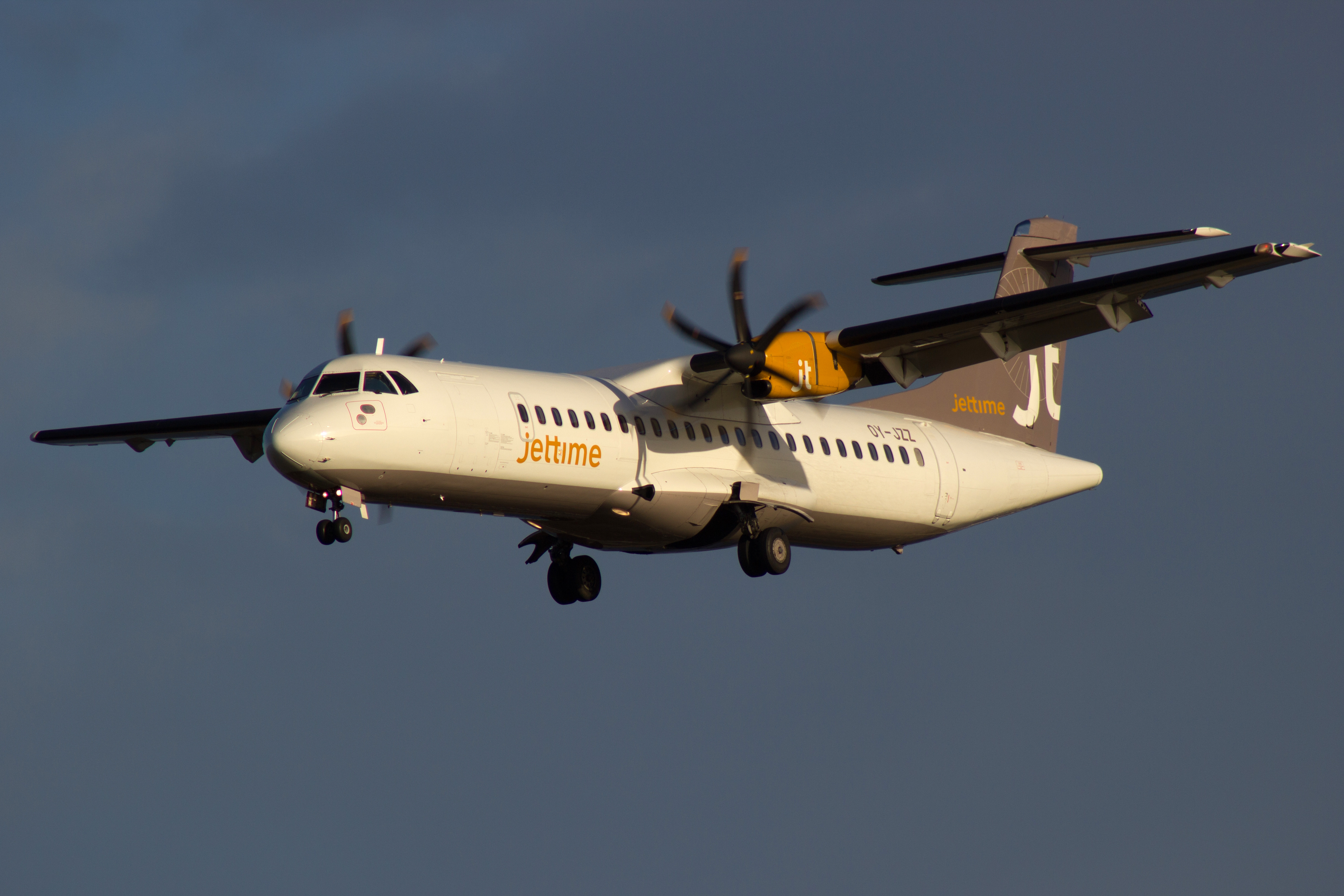
ATR 72-500

As of August 2025, Jettime operated 1 Boeing 737-700 and 12 Boeing 737-800

The airline operated the following aircraft types prior to its relaunch as Jettime:

- ATR 72-500
- ATR 72-600
- Boeing 737-300
- Boeing 737-400
- Boeing 737-500

== Operations ==
Jettime operates contract and ad hoc passenger and freight charters throughout Europe, as well as short-notice wet-lease charters for scheduled airlines including Air Greenland, Scandinavian Airlines, and Norwegian Air Shuttle. It has also provided VIP charters for clients including FC Copenhagen, Malmö FF, Mercedes-Benz, Rosenborg BK, and Volkswagen.
