= Aappilattoq Heliport (Avannaata) =

Heliport in Aappilattoq, Qaasuitsup, Greenland

- IATA: AOQ; ICAO: BGAG; LID: AAP

Summary
- Airport type: Public
- Operator: Greenland Airport Authority (Mittarfeqarfiit)
- Serves: Aappilattoq, Greenland
- Elevation AMSL: 42 ft / 13 m
- Coordinates: 72°53′13″N 55°35′46″W
- Website: Aappilattoq Heliport

Map
- Location in Greenland

Helipads
Number	Length		Surface
Number	m	ft	Surface
1	30 × 20	98 × 66	Gravel
- Source: Greenlandic AIP

Aappilattoq Heliport (IATA: AOQ, ICAO: BGAG) is a heliport in Aappilattoq, a village in the Upernavik Archipelago of Avannaata municipality in northwestern Greenland. The heliport is considered a helistop, and is served by Air Greenland as part of government contract.

There is also a heliport with the same name located in the village of Aappilattoq in the Kujalleq municipality in southern Greenland.

== Airlines and destinations ==
Airlines	Destinations
Air Greenland (settlement flights)	Upernavik

Notes
^1: Air Greenland operates government contract flights to villages in the Upernavik area. These mostly cargo flights are not featured in the timetable, although they can be pre-booked. Departure times for these flights as specified during booking are by definition approximate, with the settlement service optimized on the fly depending on local demand for a given day.
