= Aappilattoq, Avannaata =

Town in Greenland

Aappilattoq
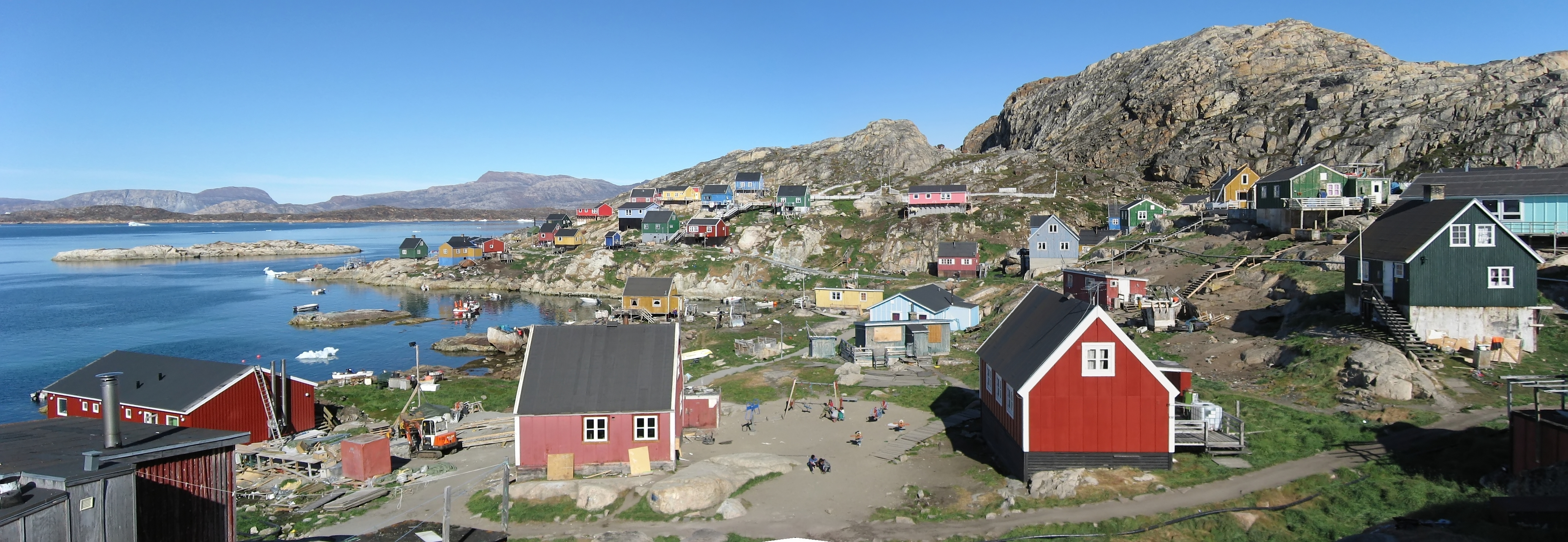

- Location within Greenland
- Coordinates: 72°53′00″N 55°36′00″W
- Sovereign state: Kingdom of Denmark
- Autonomous territory: Greenland
- Municipality: Avannaata
- Founded: 1805

Population (1 January 2025)
  - Total: 149
- Time zone: UTC−02:00 (Western Greenland Time)
  - Summer (DST): UTC−01:00 (Western Greenland Summer Time)
- Postal code: 3962 Upernavik

Aappilattoq is a settlement in the Avannaata municipality in northwestern Greenland, located on an island of the same name in the southern part of Upernavik Archipelago. Founded in 1805, the settlement had 149 inhabitants in 2025.

== Upernavik Archipelago ==
Aappilattoq within the Upernavik Archipelago

Aappilattoq is located within Upernavik Archipelago, a vast archipelago of small islands on the coast of northeastern Baffin Bay. The archipelago extends from the northwestern coast of Sigguup Nunaa peninsula in the south at approximately 71°50′N 56°00′W to the southern end of Melville Bay (Greenlandic: Qimusseriarsuaq) in the north at approximately 74°50′N 57°30′W.

== Transport ==
During weekdays Air Greenland serves the village as part of government contract, with mostly cargo helicopter flights between Aappilattoq Heliport and Upernavik Airport.

== Population ==
The population of Aappilattoq has increased in the 1990s. It has been however steadily decreasing since.

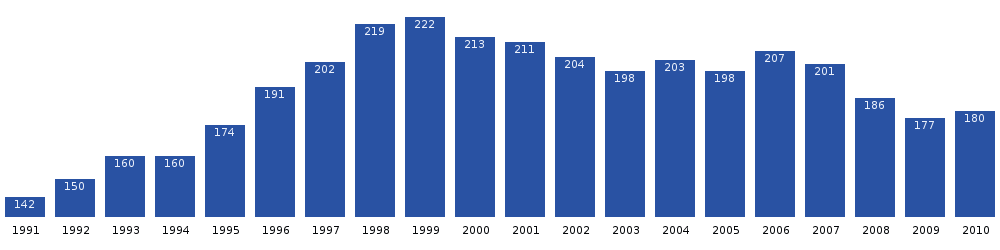
Aappilattoq population growth dynamics in the last two decades. Source: Statistics Greenland
