= Paatuup Qaqqaa =

Mountain in Greenland

Paatuup Qaqqaa is a mountain of Greenland. It is located in the Upernavik Archipelago. The peak is 476 meters tall.
