= Aappilattoq Heliport (Kujalleq) =

Heliport in Aappilattoq, Kujalleq, Greenland

- IATA: QUV; ICAO: BGAQ

Summary
- Airport type: Public
- Operator: Greenland Airport Authority (Mittarfeqarfiit)
- Serves: Aappilattoq, Greenland
- Elevation AMSL: 30 ft / 9 m
- Coordinates: 60°08′54″N 044°17′13″W
- Website: Aappilattoq Heliport

Map
- Location in Greenland

Helipads
Number	Length		Surface
Number	m	ft	Surface
1	30 × 20	98 × 66	Gravel
- Source: Danish AIS

Aappilattoq Heliport (IATA: QUV, ICAO: BGAQ) is a heliport in Aappilattoq, a village in the Kujalleq municipality in southern Greenland. The heliport is considered a helistop, and is served by Air Greenland as part of a government contract.

There is also a heliport with the same name located in the village of Aappilattoq in Avannaata municipality in northwestern Greenland.

== Airlines and destinations ==
Airlines	Destinations
Air Greenland (settlement flights)	Narsarmijit, Tasiusaq

Air Greenland operates government contract flights to villages in the Nanortalik area. These mostly cargo flights are not featured in a timetable, although they can be pre-booked. Departure times for these flights as specified during booking are by definition approximate, with the settlement service optimized on the fly depending on local demand for a given day.
