= Air Greenland =

State-owned flag carrier airline of Greenland

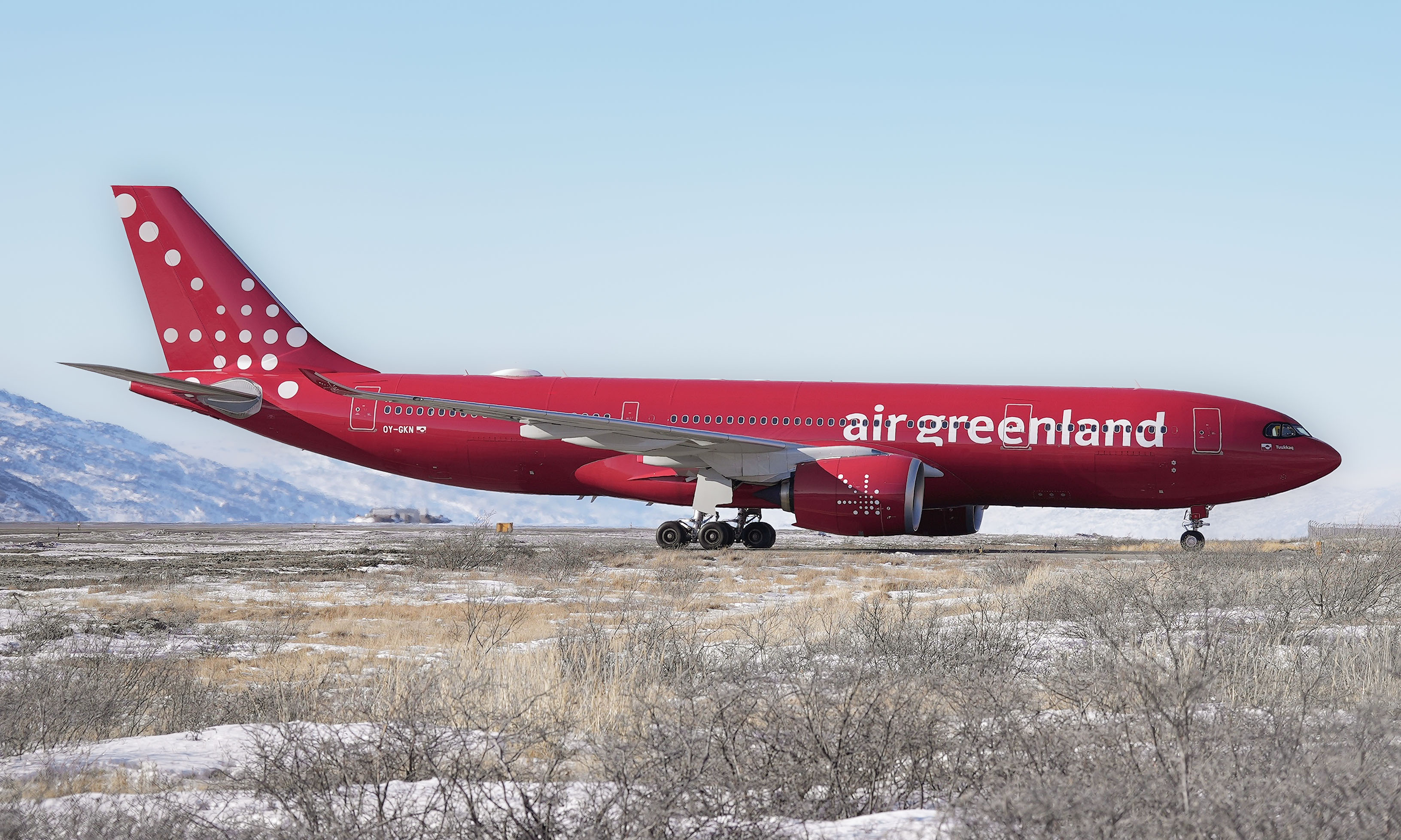
- Air Greenland's Airbus A330-800
IATA	ICAO	Call sign
GL	GRL	GREENLAND
- Founded: 7 November 1960; 66 years ago as Grønlandsfly
- Hubs: Nuuk Airport
- Focus cities: Ilulissat Airport
- Frequent-flyer program: Club Timmisa
- Subsidiaries: Greenland Travel; Hotel Arctic; World of Greenland
- Fleet size: Fixed-wing – 10; Helicopter – 18
- Destinations: 16
- Headquarters: Nuuk Airport, Nuussuaq, Greenland
- Key people: Malik Hegelund Olsen (Chair of The Board); Jacob Nitter Sørensen (CEO)
- Revenue: ▲US$194.02 million
- Operating income: ▲US$12.02 million
- Net income: ▲US$8.16 million
- Total assets: ▲US$145.87 million
- Total equity: ▲US$103.88 million
- Employees: 745
- Website: airgreenland.com

Air Greenland A/S (formerly named Grønlandsfly and Greenlandair) is the flag carrier airline of Greenland, owned by the government of Greenland. It operates a fleet of 28 aircraft, including a single Airbus A330-800 airliner used for transatlantic flights, 9 fixed-wing aircraft primarily serving the domestic network and 18 helicopters feeding passengers from the smaller communities into the domestic airport network. Flights to heliports in the remote settlements are operated on contract with the government of Greenland. Its domestic and international hub is at Nuuk Airport.

Besides running scheduled services and government-contracted flights to most villages in the country, the airline also provides charter services for remote research stations, tourists, mineral-resource industries and operates medivac and search and rescue (SAR) flights during emergencies. Air Greenland has several subsidiaries, including in hotels, tour operators, and a travel agency specialised in Greenlandic tourism.

== History ==
=== Establishment and early years ===
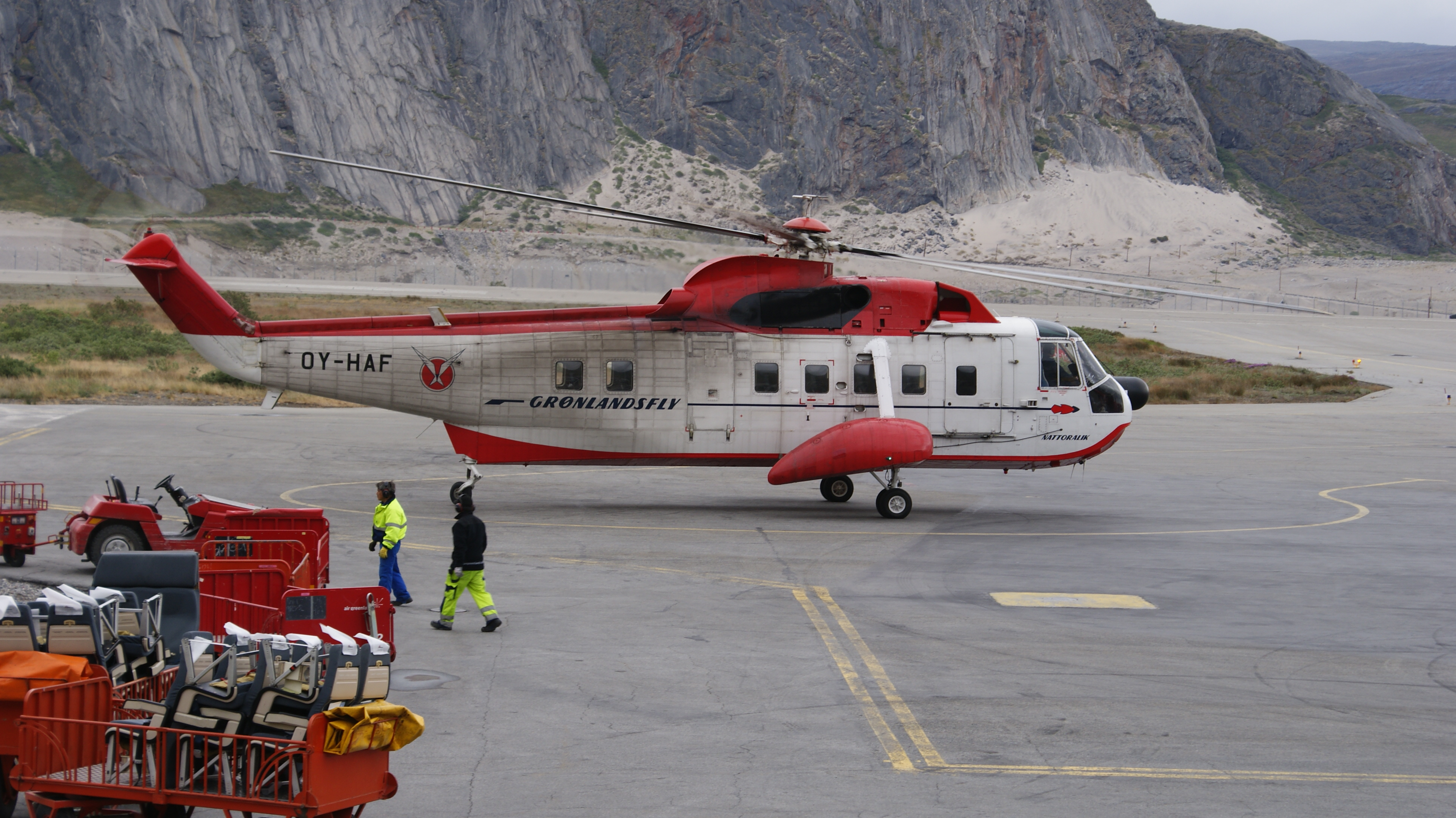
The Sikorsky S-61N helicopter, acquired in 1965, was one of the earliest aircraft in Air Greenland's fleet.

The airline was established on 7 November 1960 as Grønlandsfly A/S, by the Scandinavian Airlines System (SAS) and Kryolitselskabet Øresund, a Danish mining company involved with the cryolite operations at Ivittuut to provide transport and logistics for four American radar bases in Greenland. In 1962, interests in the firm were acquired by the Provincial Council (now the Greenland Home Rule Government) and the Royal Greenland Trade Department (now KNI).

The first flights serving the American bases in Greenland operated lightweight DHC-3 Otters and Sikorsky S-55 helicopters chartered from Canada. After a crash in 1961, Grønlandsfly used PBY Catalina water planes and DHC-6 Twin Otters on domestic routes. One of the Catalinas then crashed in 1962. In 1965, the Douglas DC-4 became the line's first larger airplane. It was followed by Sikorsky S-61 helicopters, which have remained in use: in 2010, they still served the communities of Kujalleq municipality in southern Greenland year-round and those of Disko Bay during the winter.

=== 1970s ===
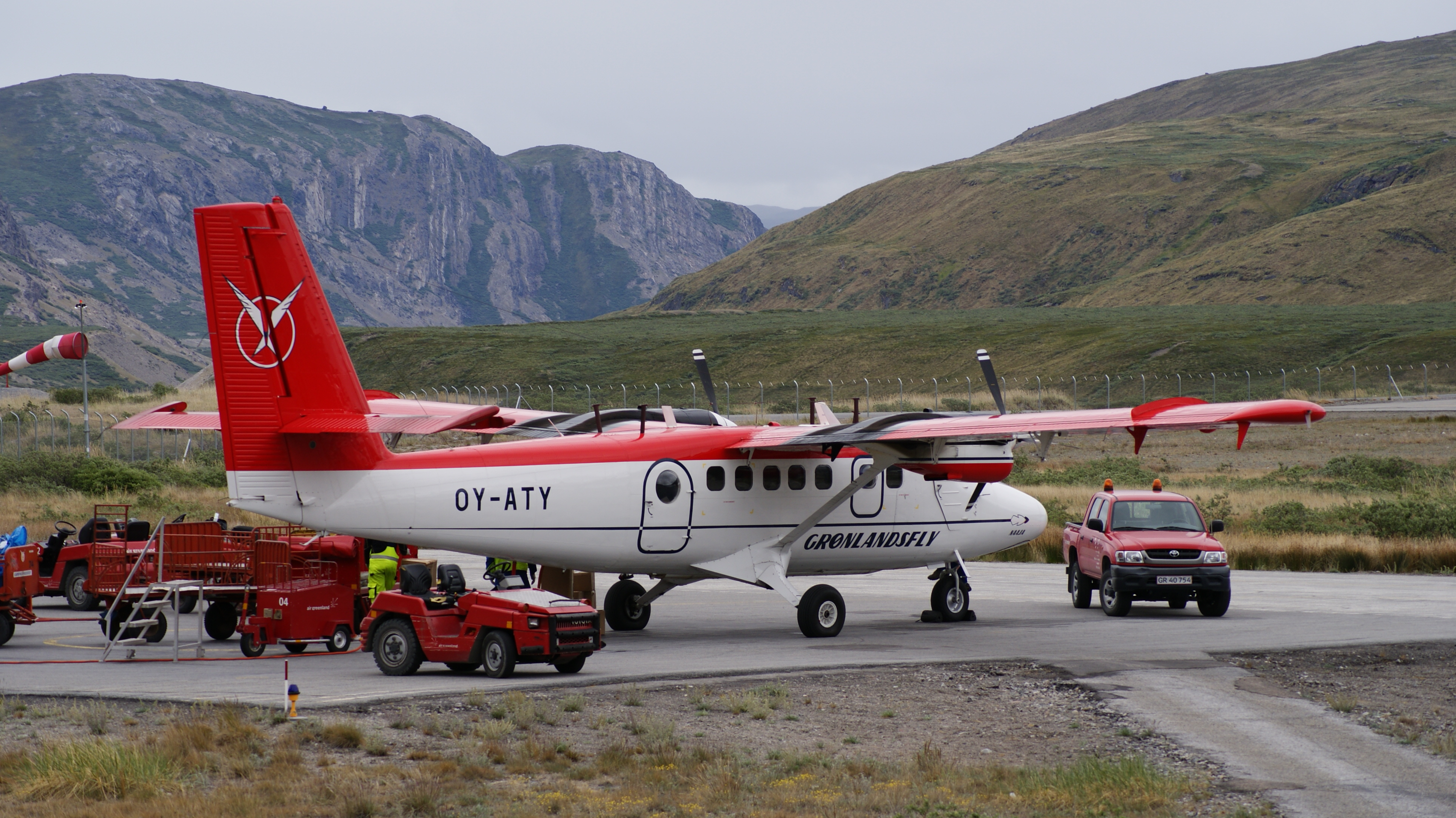
Air Greenland's DHC-6 Twin Otters were used for ambulance and charter flights, such as to the research base at Summit Camp.

During the 1970s, Grønlandsfly upgraded its DC-4 to the newer DC-6, but principally focused on expanding its helicopter fleet, purchasing five more S-61s. By 1972, it opened up service to east Greenland with a helicopter based in Tasiilaq, and established Greenlandair Charter. Mining at Maamorilik in the Uummannaq Fjord required still more helicopters, and the airline purchased Bell 206s for the route. Grønlandsfly also picked up a Danish government contract to fly reconnaissance missions regarding the sea ice around Greenland.

By the end of 1979, the number of Grønlandsfly passengers served annually exceeded 60,000, more than the population of Greenland.

=== 1980s ===
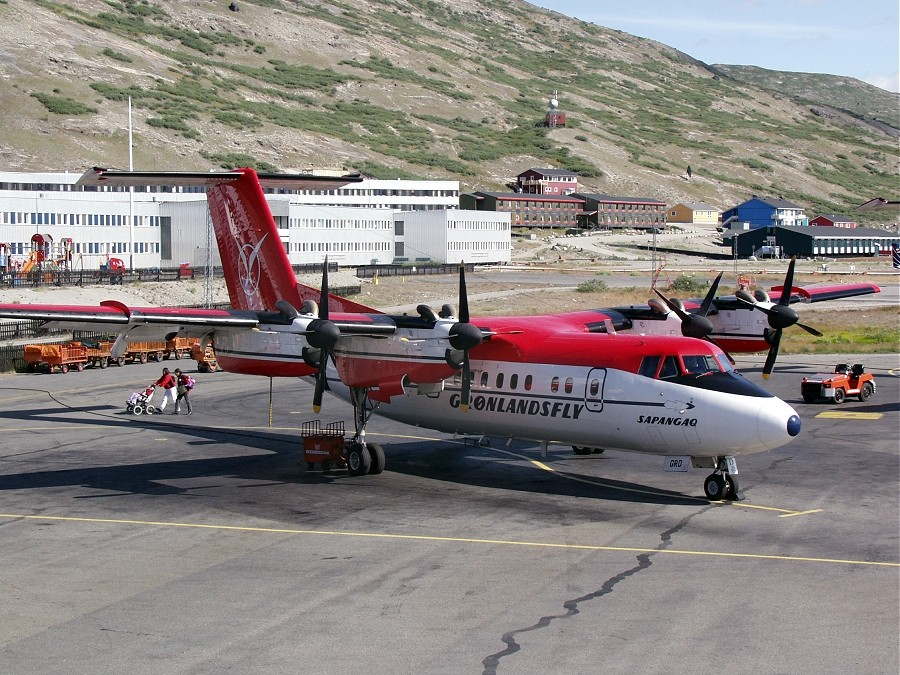
Air Greenland used the -102 (pictured) and -103 variants of the Dash 7. The latter of this aircraft is equipped with a front cargo section.

The establishment of the Greenland Home Rule Government led to investment in a regional network of STOLports (short take-off and landing) in Nuuk in 1979 and Ilulissat in 1984. Kulusuk was also repurposed from its prior military use. These early airports were built without de-icing equipment, a situation that has proven problematic during Greenland's winters and continues to cause delays and losses for the airline. The decade also saw the company train and hire its first native Kalaallit pilots.

To service the enlarged network, Grønlandsfly began acquiring DHC-7s, planes particularly suited to the often severe weather conditions in Greenland. The first was delivered on 29 September 1979, followed by more over the next decade. These planes served every airport except Nerlerit Inaat near Ittoqqortoormiit, until 2010. Service to Nerlerit Inaat has been handled by Icelandair and Norlandair under contract with Greenland Home Rule.

In 1981, the airline's first international route was also opened, running between Greenland's capital Nuuk and Iqaluit Airport in northern Canada. The route connected Greenland's Kalaallit with Canada's Inuit and was operated in conjunction with the Canadian First Air line, but the planes were generally run empty and the route was shuttered 13 years later in 1994. Also in 1981, Grønlandsfly opened its first route to Iceland, linking Reykjavík Airport to its main hub at Kangerlussuaq via Kulusuk. In 1986, a route to Keflavík allowed the company to break SAS's monopoly on flights between Greenland and Denmark via a Keflavík-Copenhagen leg operated by Icelandair. By 1989, the airline employed more than 400 Greenlanders and carried more than 100,000 passengers annually.

=== 1990s ===
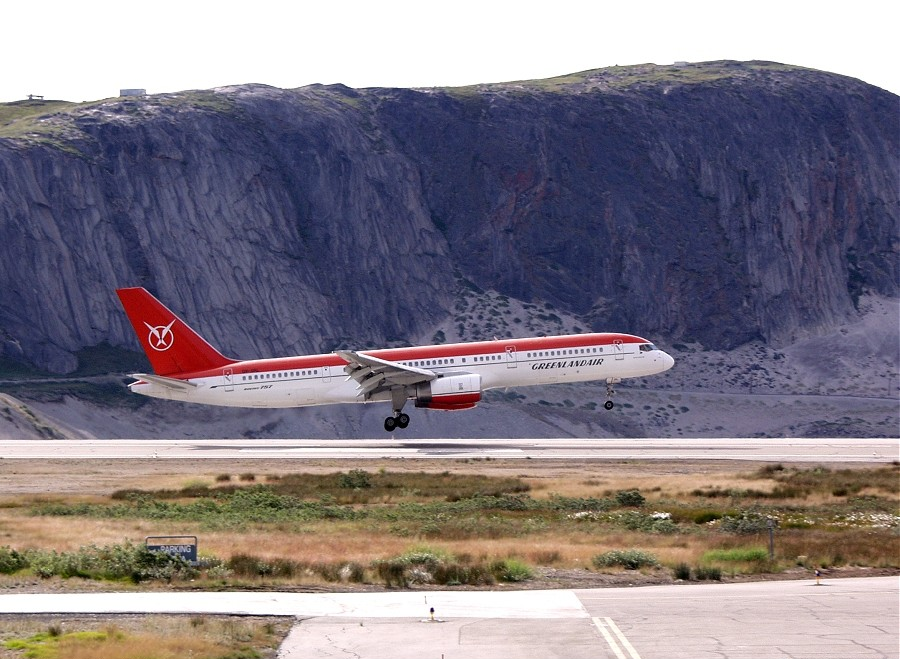
Air Greenland's first jet airliner, a Boeing 757-200, landing at Kangerlussuaq Airport in 2001.

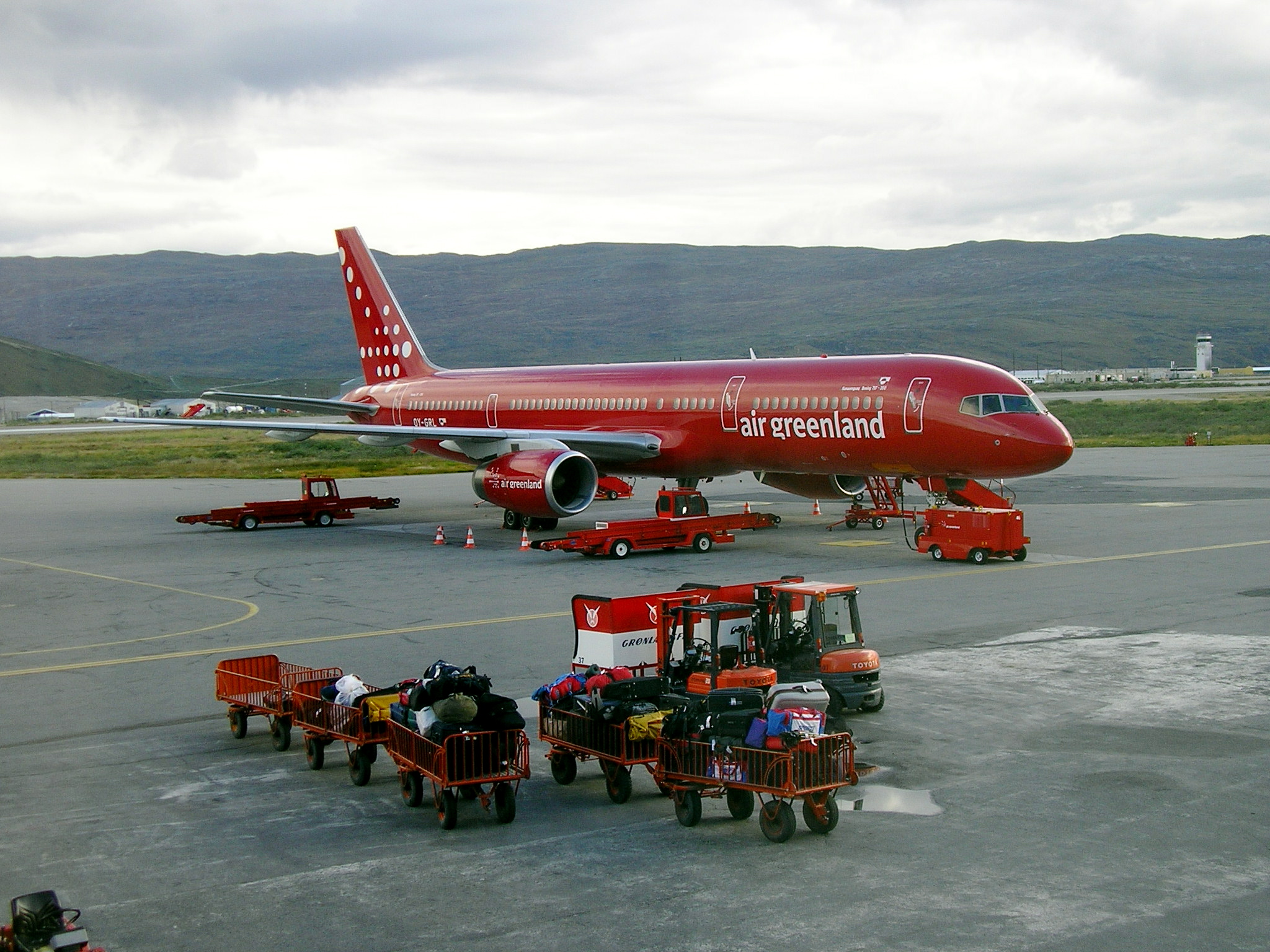
The same airliner in Air Greenland livery (2005). The aircraft was named Kunuunnguaq and registered OY-GRL.

The company saw its activity curtailed as the mines at Ivittuut (1987) and Maamorilik (1990) closed operation, leading to a recession in the Greenlandic economy.

The newly Greenlandic Government began expanding the network of STOLports in the period 1998-2007. These were very expensive to construct and Greenland's airport fees are still among the highest in the world. STOLports were constructed in Sisimiut, Maniitsoq and Aasiaat in mid-western Greenland. Qaarsut and Upernavik were also built in northwestern Greenland. With the purchase of a fifth Dash 7, Grønlandsfly was – for the first time since its inception – able to provide plane services to all major towns in Greenland.

Grønlandsfly also purchased its first jet aircraft, a Boeing 757-200 that began operation in May 1998. The airliner was named Kunuunnguaq in honour of the Greenlandic explorer and ethnologist Knud Rasmussen, whose bust decorates in the terminal of Kangerlussuaq hub. The airliner allowed the company to run the profitable Kangerlussuaq–Copenhagen route directly, without affiliates or a layover in Iceland. Thus, in 1999, the airline served 282,000 passengers, nearly triple the number at the end of the previous decade.

=== 2000s ===
Around the turn of the millennium, the airline renewed its aging fleet, retiring several of its S-61 and 206 helicopters and replacing them with Bell 212s and Eurocopter AS350s.

At this time, CEO Peter Fich resigned, who had proven unable to balance Greenland Home Rule's demands for local Greenlander service with the board's for expanded tourism, lower fares and higher profits. Under his replacement Finn Øelund, Grønlandsfly initially posted a DKK 30 million loss as contractual obligations maintained unprofitable service while a strike ruined the summer tourist season and Post Greenland moved a lucrative mail contract to the Danish-owned Air Alpha Greenland.

In response, the company successfully pushed back against Greenland Home Rule's large demands, high fees and low subsidies and rebranded itself, changing its name to Air Greenland and adopting a new logo and livery on 18 April 2002 (previously known as Greenlandair).

In 2003, Finn Øelund left to head Maersk Air and was replaced as CEO by Flemming Knudson. Air Greenland opened a route from Copenhagen to Akureyri in Iceland; the service lasted for six years before finally being deemed unprofitable and ended. Also in 2003, SAS abandoned its Greenland service, leading Air Greenland to purchase its second airliner, an Airbus A330-200 named Norsaq. (SAS briefly revived the service during the peak season in 2007 before dropping it again in January 2009.) Owing to SAS's withdrawal from the market, Air Greenland received its contract with the U.S. Air Force for passenger service to and from Thule Air Base. Running from February 2004, the contract was renewed for another five-year period in 2008 despite SAS's brief return to the market.

The first takeover of another airline took place on 28 July 2006, when Air Greenland acquired Air Alpha Greenland, a subsidiary of Danish carrier Air Alpha. Air Alpha Greenland had operated helicopter flights in Disko Bay and in eastern Greenland. Since the takeover, the acquired Bell 222 helicopters have been used for passenger transfers between Nerlerit Inaat Airport and Ittoqqortoormiit Heliport.

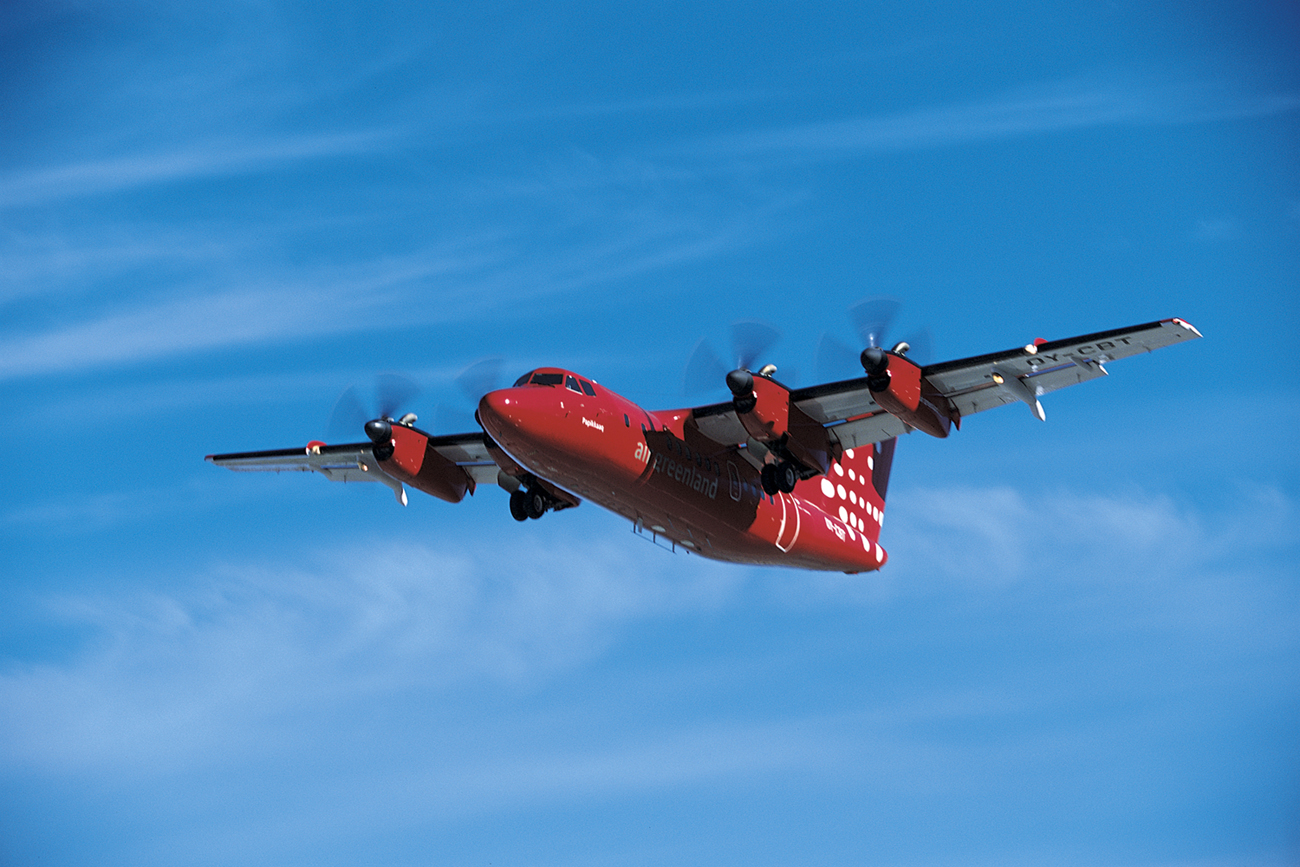
The De Havilland Canada Dash 7 aircraft were the domestic backbone of the airline until the 2010s.

In 2007, Flemming Knudson was moved to head the Royal Greenland fishing concern and current CEO Michael Binzer was hired with a mandate to lead the company towards greater commercialisation and self-sufficiency under the Qarsoq 2012 ("Arrow 2012") plan. On 13 June, SAS announced its intention to sell its stake in Air Greenland, a move later incorporated into its restructuring programme, but as of 2012 it has not found any buyers. On 1 October, the airline introduced its e-ticket system. Also in 2007, Air Greenland began direct service with Baltimore/Washington International Airport in the United States, using a leased Boeing 757 from ATA Airlines. After sixty American visitors were stranded by a strike of Air Greenland employees and the company refused to make alternate arrangements for their return, ticket sales slumped and the route was closed in March 2008. In 2009, the airline carried 399,000 passengers. In 2024, the company had 745 employees, more than 1% of the Greenlandic population.

=== Since 2010 ===
In the 2010s, Air Greenland curtailed some services. On 1 January 2010, Air Greenland suspended its participation in SAS's EuroBonus frequent-flyer program due to technical difficulties. In 2011, nonstop service from Narsarsuaq to Copenhagen was suspended. However, some expansion continued. In order to compete with Icelandair, which operates service from Reykjavik Airport to Nuuk, Narsarsuaq, Ilulissat and the east coast of Greenland and now controls about 15% the market in Greenland-bound travel, Air Greenland opened a nonstop route between Nuuk and Keflavík International Airport in Iceland in 2010.

Also, owing to improved technology and higher commodity prices, the Maarmorilik mines were due to reopen in November 2010 with zinc and iron ore reserves projected to last 50 years. As in the 1970s, the mine's supply flights to the mine would have been operated by Air Greenland, using Bell helicopters (212s) based out of the Uummannaq Heliport. In July 2015, Air Greenland became a member of the European Regions Airline Association.

Prior to 2016, Air Greenland held a 50% stake in the Arctic Umiaq Line, an unprofitable but government-subsidised ferry service, with the other 50% controlled by Royal Arctic Line. In 2016 Air Greenland sold its stake in the company to Royal Arctic Line, and since July 1, 2016 the Arctic Umiaq Line has operated as a wholly owned subsidiary of Royal Arctic Line.

Similar to most airlines, Air Greenland experienced a decline in weekly flights during the COVID-19 pandemic. However, the decline was less than most airlines due to Greenland's remoteness and vast distance between the communities.

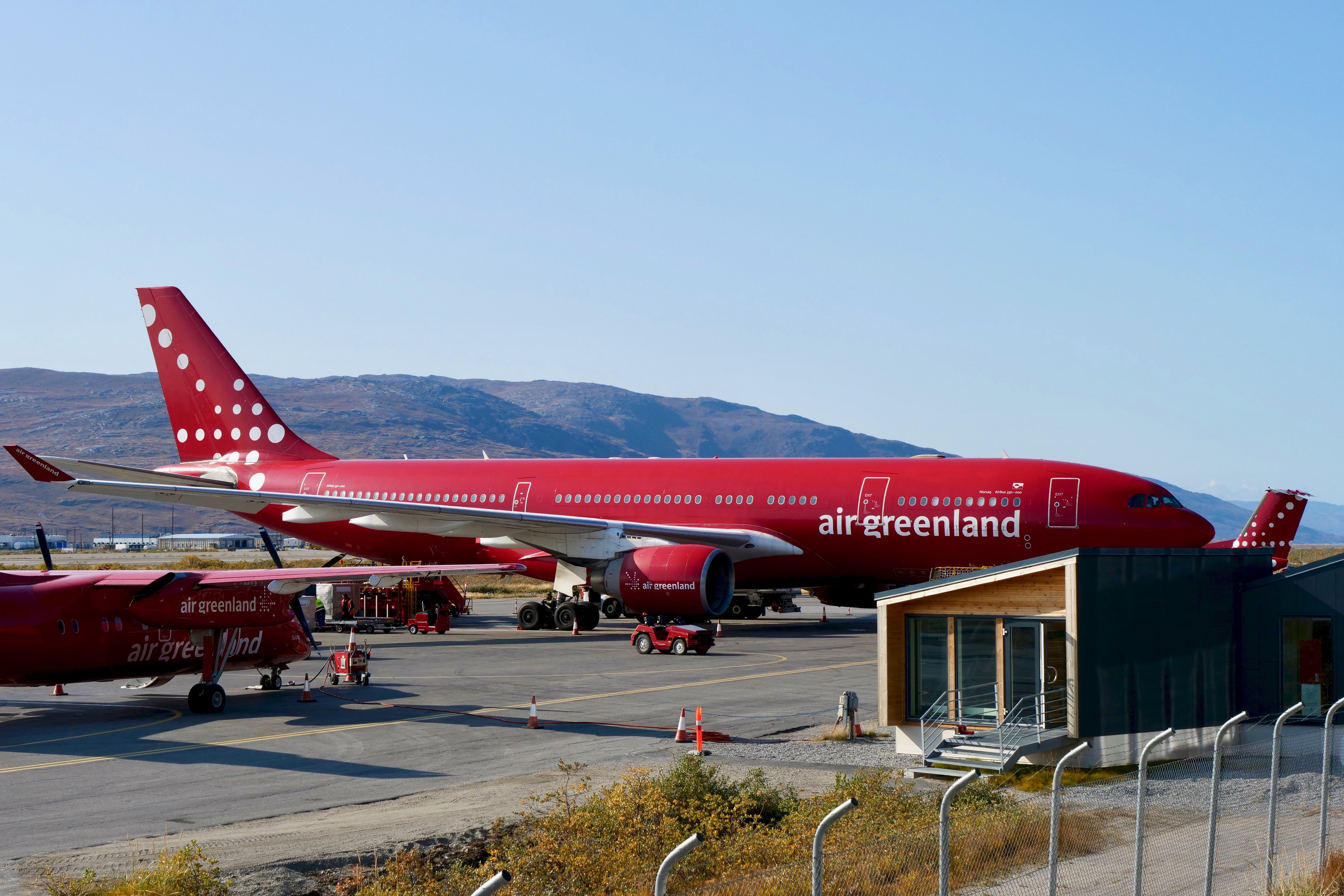
Air Greenland's A330-200, delivered in 2003 and flown until 2023.

==== Fleet changes ====
Air Greenland sold its Boeing 757-200 in 2010, leaving it with a single Airbus A330 for its transatlantic fleet, which consolidated transatlantic service to Kangerlussuaq, leaving Narsarsuaq with reduced service. Air Greenland's last remaining Twin Otter aircraft was sold in 2011 to Norlandair in exchange for cash and a one-fourth interest in the Icelandic company.

Also in 2010, the airline acquired its first De Havilland Canada Dash 8-200 aircraft, beginning its transition from its Dash 7 fleet. By 2015, the last Dash 7 aircraft had been phased out, completing the transition of its domestic fixed-wing fleet to Dash 8-200 aircraft. In December 2022, Air Greenland took delivery of its new Airbus A330-800, named Tuukkaq. Subsequently, their older A330-200 was scrapped.

==== Route to Canada ====
In 2012, Air Greenland reopened the connection to Iqaluit, now the capital of Nunavut. From 2012 to 2013, the airline saw a shy increase of 4 passengers flying to Nunavut over the previous year. However, this route ceased in 2015 due to lack of commercial viability. In June 2024, Air Greenland relaunched the route with a weekly summer seasonal direct flight between Iqaluit and Nuuk. The route is interlined with Canadian North and timed to connect passengers arriving on Canadian North flights from Kuujjuaq, Montreal and Ottawa.

==== Other new routes ====
Air Greenland also performed charter flights within Europe on behalf of European travel agencies using its Airbus A330. The A330 was used from Pituffik Space Base and Kangerlussuaq to Copenhagen Kastrup. In March 2017, Air Greenland also announced adding more flights to Kangerlussuaq. Air Greenland opened up new routes from Kangerlussuaq to Billund and Aalborg in 2023, with leased Boeing 737 aircraft from Jettime, a Danish charter airline. A Narsarsuaq to Billund route was also introduced.

==== New airports ====
In 2015, Greenlandic government in cooperation with Danish government funding decided to expand both Nuuk and Ilulissat airports, lengthening their runways to 2,200 m and building new terminal and service buildings. The new airports signify a substantial change in the Greenlandic aviation sector, both in terms of competition and route structure.

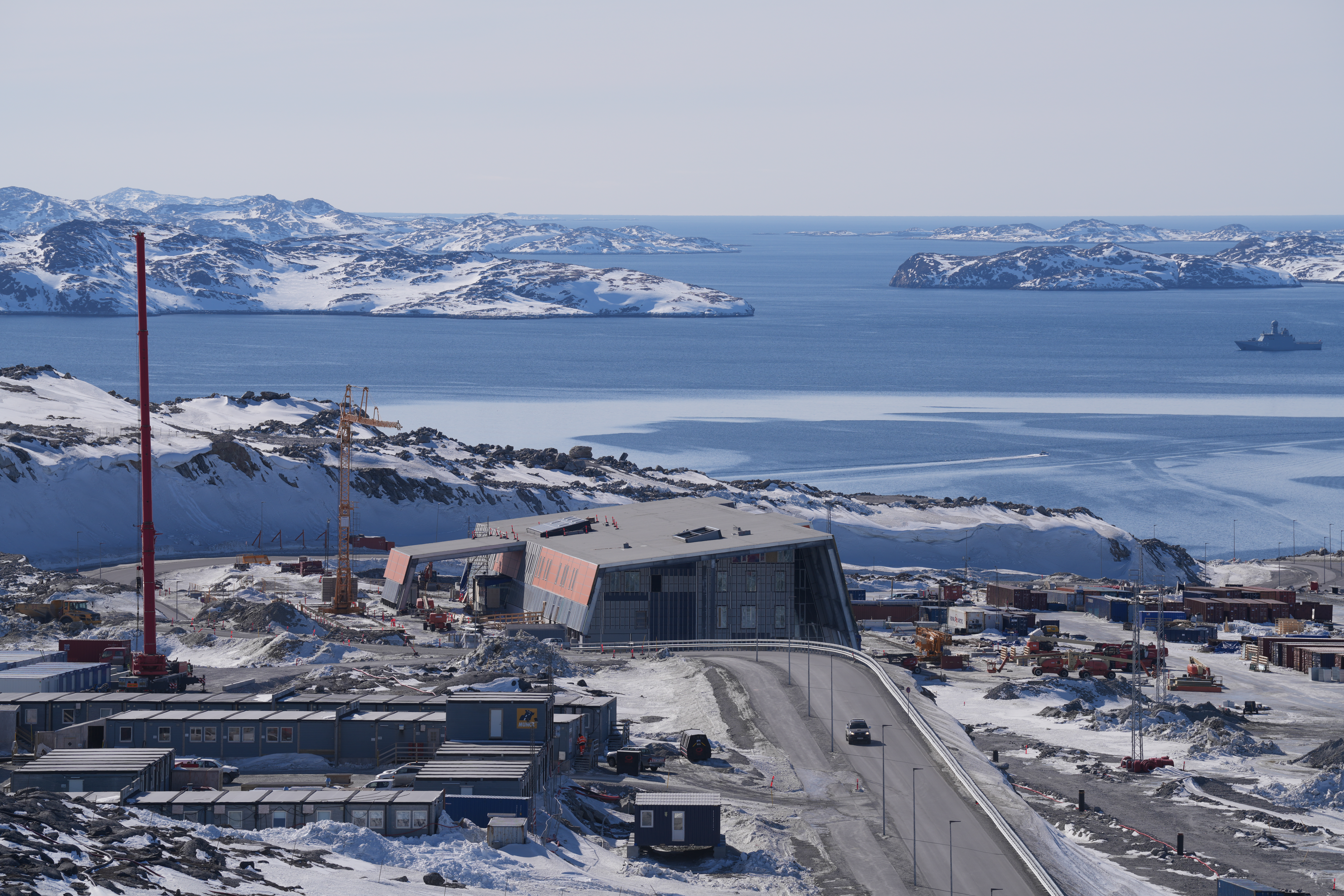
Nuuk airport's new terminal under construction in 2023.

The new Nuuk Airport was opened with a rebuilt and expanded runway in November 2024. Subsequently, Air Greenland transitioned their international and domestic hub to Nuuk Airport, with their flagship A330-800 now operating between Nuuk and Copenhagen becoming the first long-haul aircraft to touch down at the newly expanded runway. Kangerlussuaq Airport will remain a domestic airport and will be served by seasonal flights to Copenhagen as a stopover using leased aircraft. Routes from Kangerlussuaq to Aasiaat and Maniitsoq will be discontinued from November 2024 after the transition.

From summer 2025, Seasonal routes with leased aircraft from Jettime and Airseven to Aalborg and Billund will also be relocated to Nuuk Airport. The route from Nuuk to Billund Airport will also stopover at Keflavík International Airport, expanding Air Greenland's capacity to Iceland. Air Greenland and Icelandair announced a codeshare agreement, starting in summer 2025, the first comprehensive codeshare agreement Air Greenland has entered into.

== Destinations ==
Air Greenland's domestic airport network includes 12 civilian airports within Greenland. Outside Greenland, the airline currently operates year-round transatlantic flights to Keflavík International Airport in Iceland and Copenhagen Airport in Denmark. It also offers seasonal service to Billund and Aalborg in Denmark, as well as Iqaluit in Canada.

Nuuk Airport is Air Greenland's domestic and international hub following a major reconstruction and runway expansion completed in 2024. Two other airports capable of serving large airliners – Kangerlussuaq Airport and Narsarsuaq Airport – were constructed as U.S. Air Force military bases during WW2 and continue to be used for transatlantic flights. All other regional airports are only STOL-capable and are served with smaller De Havilland Canada Dash 8-200 fixed-wing aircraft.

Smaller communities are served via a network of 45 heliports: 8 of which are primary heliports that have tarmac landing areas, passenger terminals and permanent staff. The other heliports are helistops with either a gravel or grass landing area. Often helicopters need multiple flights for each connection to a fixed-wing flight because of passenger capacity, causing longer total travel time. The primary heliports usually connect to the wider domestic fixed-wing services. Primary heliports include Upernavik Airport/Heliport, serving northwest Greenland; Uummannaq served by Qaarsut Airport; Narsaq, Qaqortoq, and Nanortalik, which are connected by the larger Narsarsuaq Airport; and Tasiilaq, which is served by Kulusuk Airport. The only civilian airport that Air Greenland does not serve with fixed-wing aircraft is Nerlerit Inaat Airport: Norlandair provides fixed-wing services to Iceland while Air Greenland provides local helicopter transport to larger towns including Ittoqqortoormiit.

=== Codeshare and interline agreements ===
The agreement makes it again possible to combine a trip, in one ticket.

Air Greenland has interline agreements with the following airlines:

- DAT (Denmark)
- Finnair (International)
- Icelandair (International)
- Scandinavian Airlines (Scandinavia/Europe/International)
- Canadian North (Canada)

A more comprehensive codeshare agreement with Icelandair will be introduced from summer 2025.

=== Settlement flights ===
Air Greenland operates helicopter flights to most settlements in Greenland ("settlement flights") on contract with the government of Greenland, with the destination network subsidized and coordinated by the Ministry of Housing, Infrastructure and Transport. Settlement flights are not featured in the company's timetable, although they can be pre-booked.

Departure times for these flights as specified during booking are by definition approximate, with the settlement service optimised on the fly depending on local demand for a given day. Settlement flights in the Disko Bay region are unique in that they are operated only during winter and spring. During summer and autumn, transport between settlements is only by sea, with services operated by Diskoline, a government-contracted ferry service based in Ilulissat.

== Fleet ==
De Havilland Canada Dash 8-200 aircraft serve the many domestic STOL airports in Greenland.

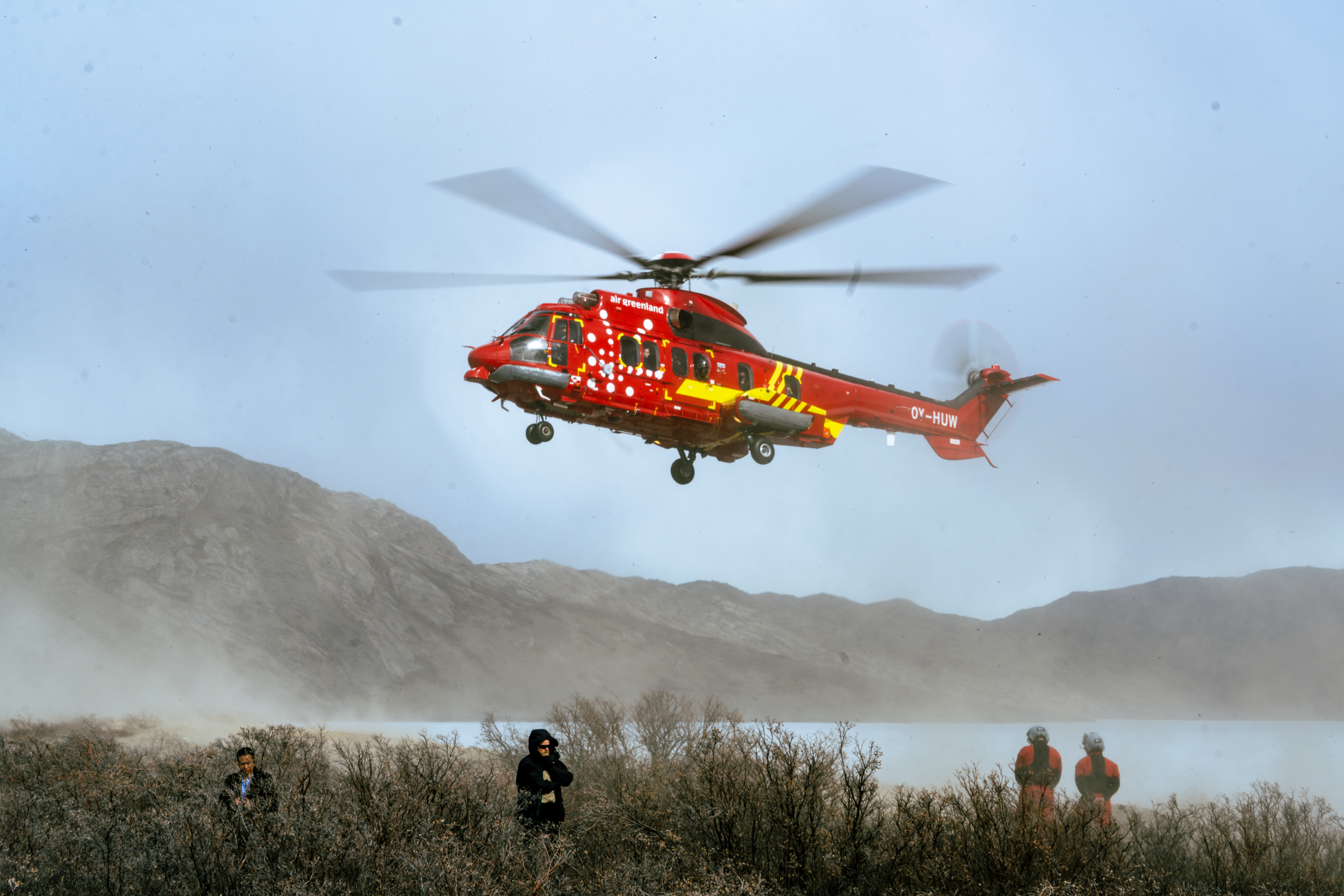
Airbus H225 near Kangerlussuaq in 2021

As of December 2024, the Air Greenland fleet includes the following active aircraft:

=== Fixed-wing fleet ===
The airline's flagship aircraft is their sole Airbus A330-800, delivered new in 2022. The De Havilland Canada DHC-8-200 is the airline's primary aircraft, operating on all domestic airport-to-airport routes. Most of Air Greenland's Dash 8 turboprops are based at Nuuk. Air Greenland also leases capacity from charter airline Jettime for seasonal routes.

As of August 2025, Air Greenland operates the following fixed-wing aircraft:

Air Greenland fixed-wing fleet
Aircraft	In service	Orders	Passengers			Notes
Aircraft	In service	Orders	C	Y	Total	Notes
Airbus A320neo	—	1	18	150	168	One leased aircraft to begin operations in April 2027.
Airbus A330-800	1	—	42	263	305	(as of July 2026)
Beechcraft B200 King Air	1	—	—	—	8	Air ambulance
De Havilland Canada Dash 8-200	8	—	—	37	37	(as of July 2026)
Total	10	1				

=== Helicopter fleet ===
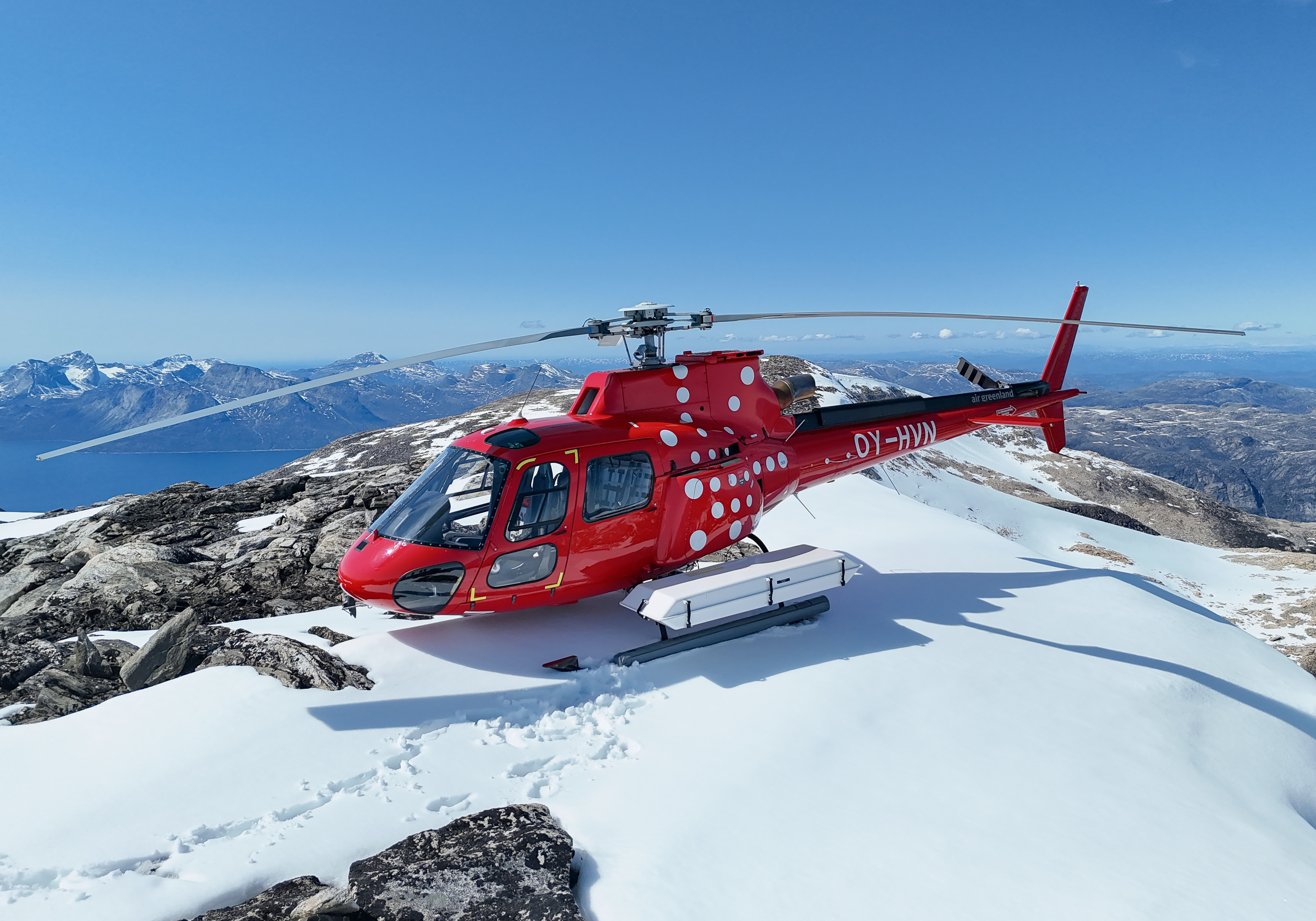
Airbus AS350 on top of Kinaussak Mountain

The Airbus H155 is the primary helicopter used for flights to district villages.

The Air Greenland helicopter fleet consists of the following aircraft (as of October 2024):

Air Greenland helicopter fleet
Aircraft	In service	Passengers	Purpose
Airbus H225	2	19 (Note: Though capable of carrying up to 19 passengers for regular service, the H225 is ordinarily configured for search and rescue operations, capable of carrying up to 6 stretchers)	SAR
Airbus H155	7	12	Domestic routes
Airbus AS350	9	5	Domestic routes/charter
Total	18		

=== Historical fleet ===
The older Sikorsky S-61N helicopters were stationed in Ilulissat Airport and Qaqortoq Heliport. With a capacity to seat 25 passengers, the S-61 based in southern Greenland was used to shuttle passengers arriving from Copenhagen at Narsarsuaq Airport. The sale of the Boeing 757 in April 2010 contributed to the long-term decline of the airport, with the airline planning to remove the old helicopter from the fleet. The airline's Airbus A330-200 was scrapped in 2023, after delivery of its new A330-800.

In the past, Air Greenland (Grønlandsfly) also used the following aircraft:

- Aérospatiale Alouette III
- Airbus A330-200
- Bell 212
- Bell 204
- Bell 206B Jet Ranger
- Boeing 757-200 (leased from Icelandair)
- Cessna 172
- Cessna 550
- de Havilland Canada DHC-6 Twin Otter
- de Havilland Canada Dash 7
- Douglas DC-3
- Douglas DC-4
- Douglas DC-6
- MD-500
- Consolidated PBY Catalina
- Piper PA-18 Super Cub
- Piper PA-31
- Sikorsky S-55
- Sikorsky S-58
- Sikorsky S-61

== Management and structure ==
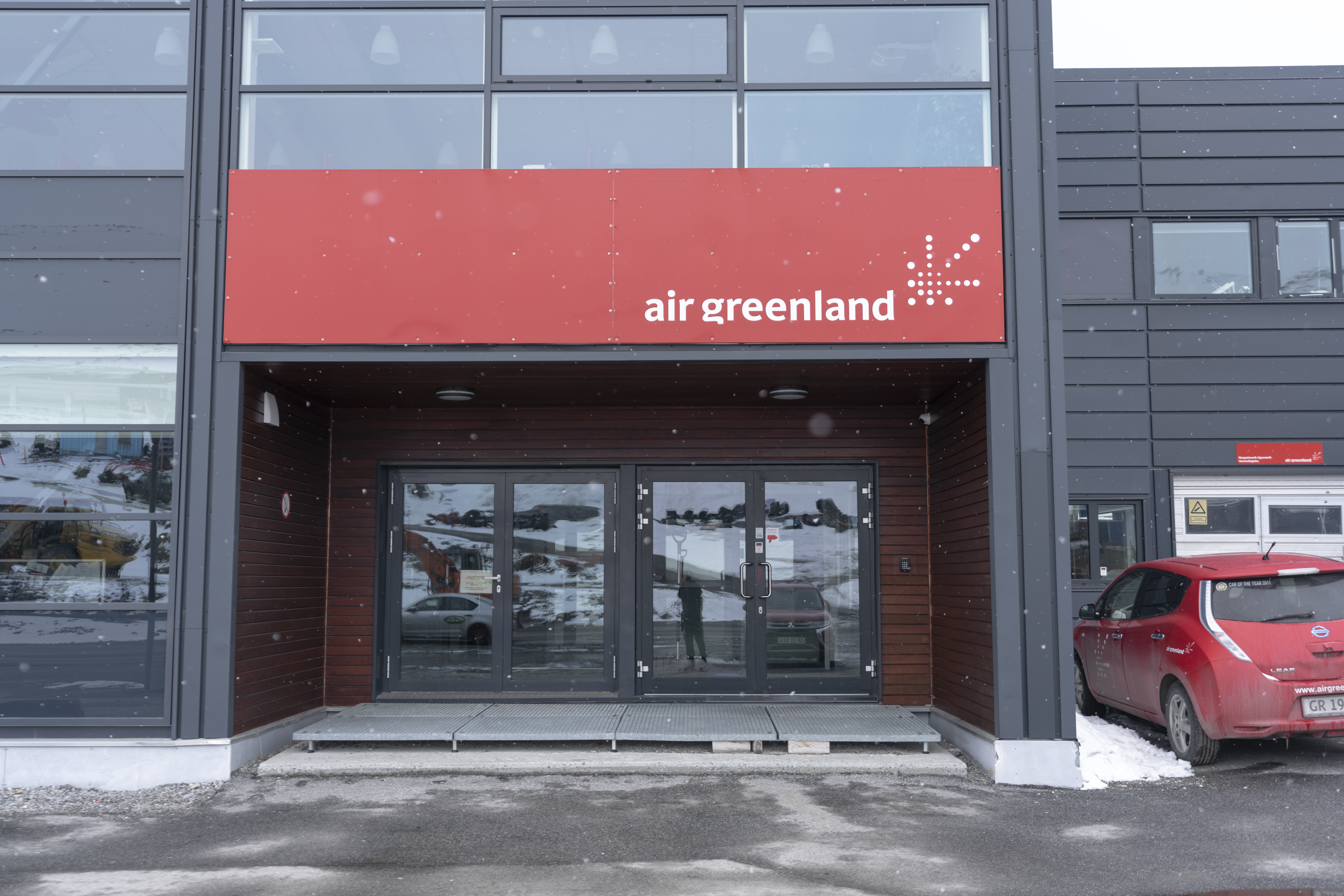
Air Greenland headquarters in Nuuk

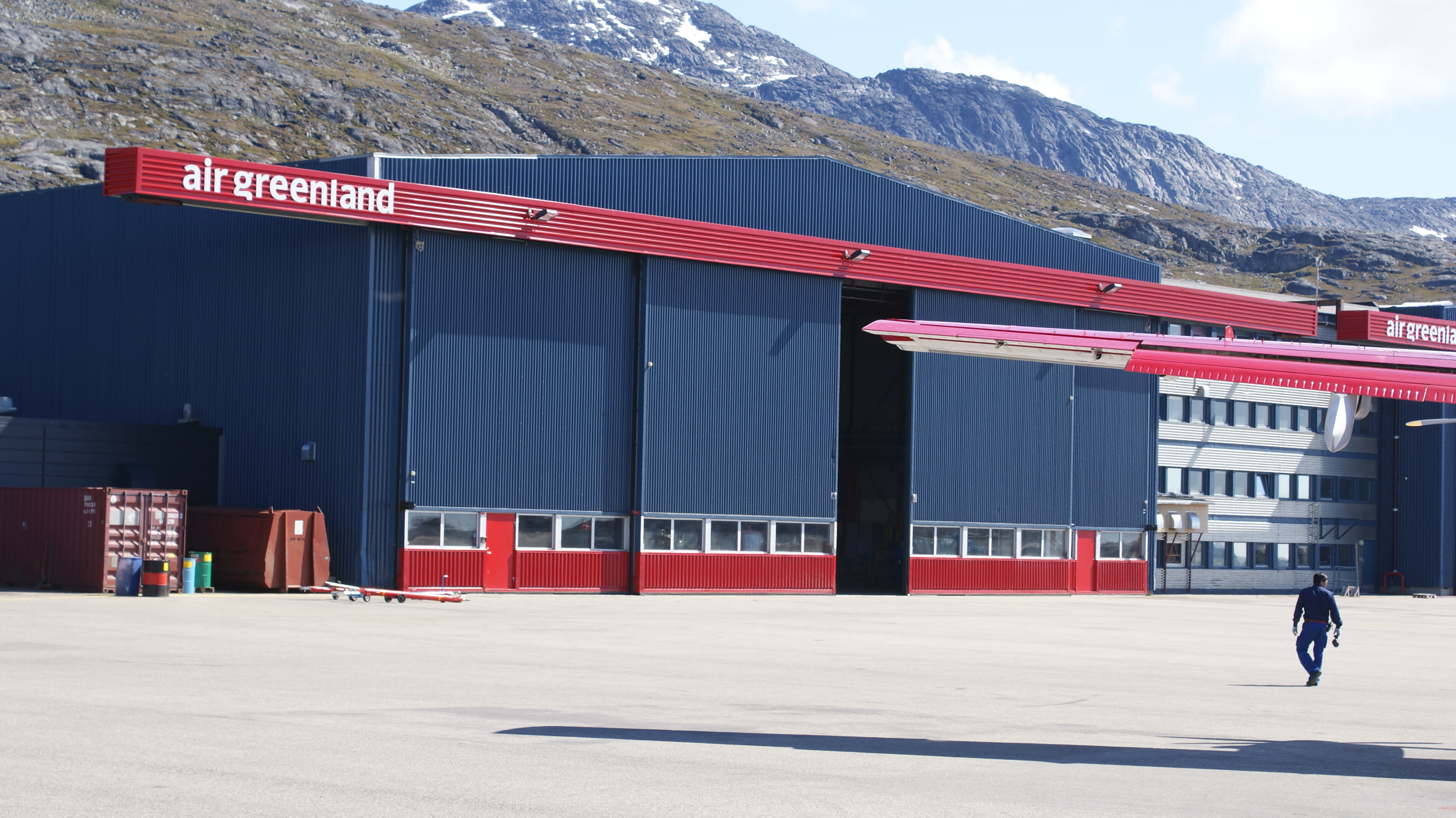
Air Greenland hangars at Nuuk Airport

On 29 May 2019 the Greenlandic Government acquired 37.5% of the shares in Air Greenland from the SAS Group and 25% of the company shares from the Danish Government, becoming the sole owner of the airline. The total price of the 62.5% share was DKK 462 mill. The government ownership is held by the Ministry of Housing, Infrastructure, and Transport, that oversees the development of the transport industry in Greenland and controls Mittarfeqarfiit, the airport authority in Greenland.

The Air Greenland board of directors has a total of nine members, including three members representing airline employees. The current chairman is Kjeld Zacho Jørgensen (appointed 2018) and the deputy-chairman is Bodil Marie Damgaard (appointed 2016). The CEO of Air Greenland is Jakob Nitter Sørensen, appointed in January 2017.

Headquartered in Nuuk, the airline had 668 employees in December 2009. The airline's technical base is located at Nuuk Airport.

Air Greenland owns 39% of the Icelandic airline Norlandair ehf.

=== Charter ===
The charter unit within Air Greenland is led by Hans Peter Hansen and employs 8 people, with 13 helicopters and 3 fixed-wing aircraft at its disposal. Excess capacity of airplanes is used for regular charters to tourist destinations in Europe, Asia, and Africa.

The helicopters, primarily the AS350, are used for special flights, such as search and rescue, air ambulance, charter flights to the Thule Air Base on contract with the U.S. Air Force, geological exploration, and supply flights to the mining sites and the research stations on the Greenland ice sheet. During the peak summer season, the helicopter crew is supplemented by freelance pilots from Norway and Sweden. Other charter flights include heliskiing shuttles, services for the energy industry such as facilitating oil exploration or surveying for hydroelectric stations and environmental research counting polar bears and tracking other large Arctic fauna.

=== Subsidiary companies ===
- Hotel Arctic A/S, a hotel and travel agency based in Ilulissat, is a wholly owned subsidiary of Air Greenland.
- Greenland Travel A/S, a package-tour travel agency based in Copenhagen, is a wholly owned subsidiary of Air Greenland.
  - World of Greenland A/S, an outfitter company based in Ilulissat, is a partnership between Greenland Travel A/S and Ilulissat Travel A/S.

== Service ==
=== Premium class ===
A business class – named "Premium-Class" – is offered by Air Greenland on transatlantic flights aboard Tuukkaq, its Airbus A330-800. The service includes a larger seat, a hot meal, a personal video screen, an in-seat power source, an amenity kit and blankets. Passengers travelling in premium class are eligible to use the Novia Business Class Lounge at Copenhagen Airport. There are 42 Premium class seats on their Airbus A330-800, arranged in a 2-3-2 configuration.

=== Economy class ===
Air Greenland offers flexible and restricted economy class on all flights operated with fixed-wing aircraft, with complimentary snacks and drinks. On transatlantic flights to Copenhagen, both economy class and premium class seats are available, with in-flight meals served in all classes. Air Greenland publishes a quarterly Suluk (Kalaallisut: "Wing") in-flight magazine, with general information about current political and cultural events in Greenland and with news from the airline. On board their Airbus A330-800, economy class is configured in a 2-4-2 configuration, and from rows 43-47, it changes to 2-3-2.

== Accidents and incidents ==
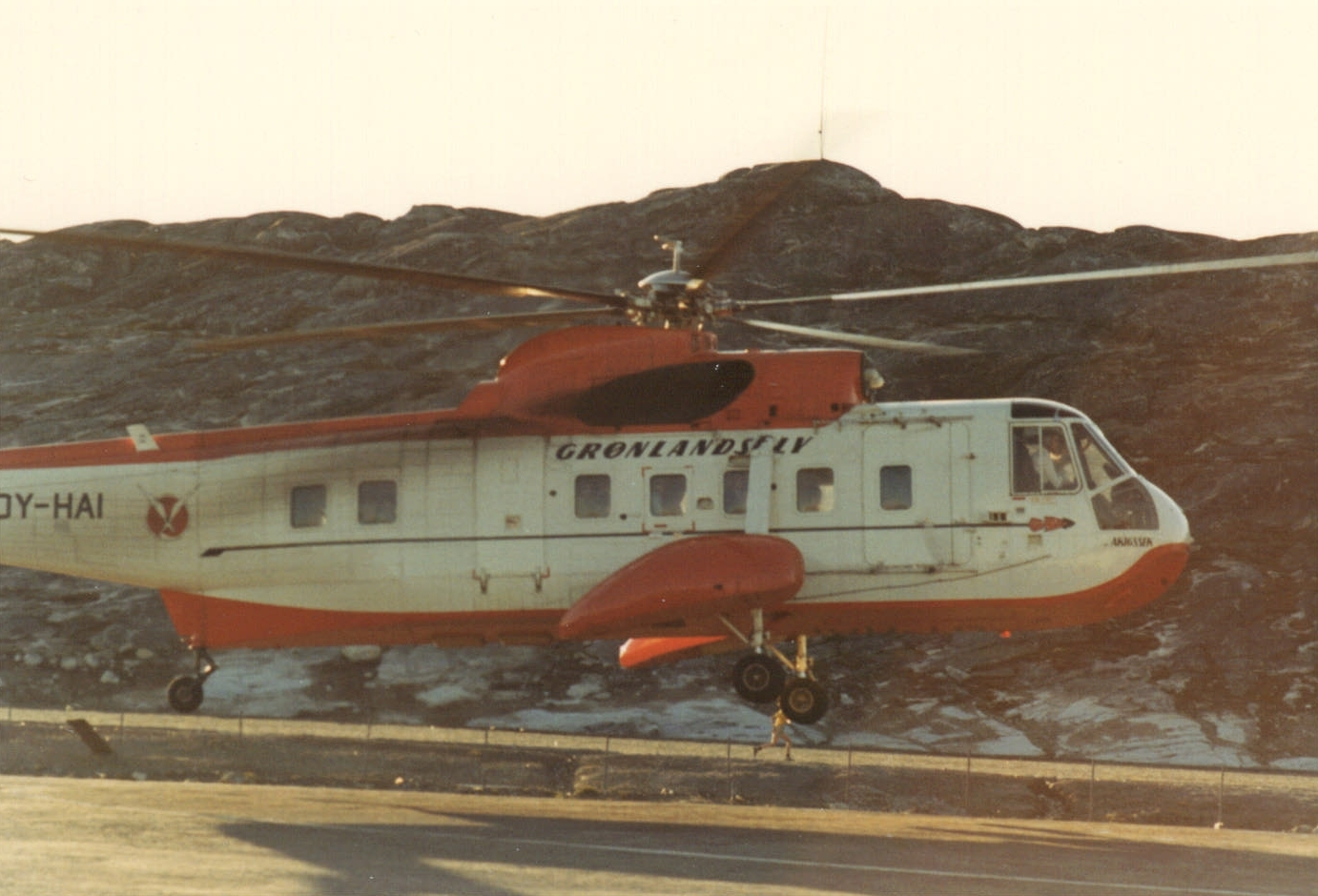
OY-HAI, the S-61N at Nuuk Heliport photographed only months before its fatal crash

- On 29 August 1961, a DHC-3 Otter (registration CF-MEX) crashed 20 kilometers (12 mi) from Kangerlussuaq. The aircraft was a non-scheduled service en route from Kangerlussuaq Airport to Aasiaat Airport when a fuel leak caused an in-flight fire. One of the pilots was killed, while the other pilot and the four passengers survived.
- On 12 May 1962, a PBY Catalina flying boat (registration CF-IHA) crashed during landing at Nuuk Airport. The accident was caused by a mechanical malfunction in the nose wheel doors preventing them from closing during landing on water, resulting in the aircraft sinking. The accident killed 15 of the 21 people on board.
- On 25 October 1973, the Akigssek ("Grouse"), an Air Greenland S-61N (registration OY-HAI), crashed about 40 kilometers (25 mi) south of Nuuk, resulting in the loss of 15 lives. It was en route to Paamiut from Nuuk. The same helicopter had had an emergency landing on the Kangerlussuaq fjord 2 years earlier, due to a double flameout on both engines because of ice in its intake.
- On 7 June 2008, a Eurocopter AS350 crashed on the runway at Nuuk Airport. There were no injuries, but the helicopter was damaged beyond repair.
- On 29 January 2014, Air Greenland Flight 3205, an Air Greenland Dash 8-Q202 (registration OY-GRI), was involved in a runway excursion accident at Ilulissat Airport (BGJN), Greenland. Flight GL3205 originated in Kangerlussuaq Airport (BGSF), Greenland. Four passengers were taken to the hospital for observation, there were no fatalities or serious injuries. The aircraft went off the left side of the runway and down a 10–15-metre (33–49 ft) dropoff and came to rest on rocky terrain approximately abeam the runway 25 threshold. There was strong crosswind conditions gusting at 35 knots (65 km/h; 40 mph). The aircraft was not repaired, but was instead written off.

== See also ==
- Transport in Greenland
- List of airports in Greenland
- List of the largest airports in the Nordic countries
- List of companies of Greenland
- Economy of Greenland
