= Ravnefjeldet =

Mountain in Greenland

Coordinates: 60°09.9′N 45°15.6′W

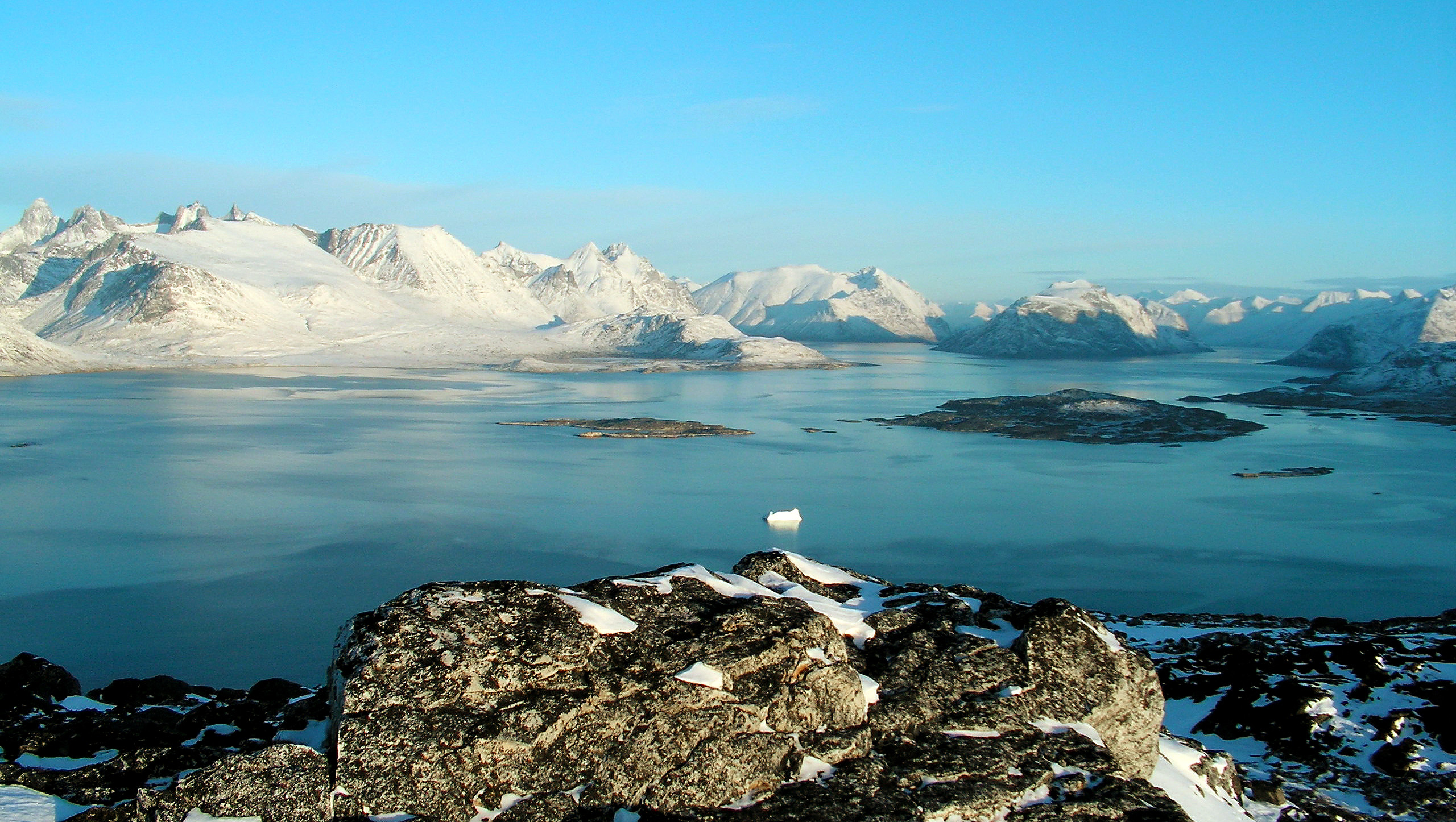
View from Ravnefjeldet

Ravnefjeldet (Raven Mountain) (308 metres), also known as Quassik, is a mountain close to Nanortalik in the tip of southern Greenland
