= List of Greenlandic artists =

This is a list of Greenlandic artists who were born in or who live in Greenland.

== A ==
- Ivalo Abelsen (born 1971), Nuuk
- Naja Abelsen (born 1964), painter, illustrator, stamp designer
- Anne-Mette Arendt, Nuuk
- Aron of Kangeq (Inuit, 1822–1869), Kangeq, watercolors, woodcuts
- Pia Arke (1958–2007), photography, photocollage, installation
- Pierre André Auzias (French), Uummannaq

== B ==
- Peter Jens Ville Berthelsen (1923–1990), Nuuk, painter, and Greenlandic flag contestant
- Aron Berthelsen (1933–2009), sculpture
- Rasmus Berthelsen (1827–1901), poet, woodcarving
- Esra Bertelsen (1889–1954), woodcarving
- Kelly Berthelsen (born 1967)
- Ivan Burkal (born 1955), Nuuk

== C ==
- Bibi Chemnitz (Danish-Greenlandic), Copenhagen, Denmark, fashion design, printmaking
- Jørgen Chemnitz (1890–1956), photography
- Thue Christiansen (born 1940), painting, sculpture, designed the flag of Greenland in 1985

== D ==
- Mathias Ferslev Dalager (Mathias Fersløv Dalager, Danish–Inuit, c. 1769–1843), Ritenbenk, painting
- Jakob Danielsen (born 1888 Sioraq, Disko Island, died 1938, Qeqertarsuaq), watercolors of hunting culture of north Greenland

== F ==
- Ivalo Frank (born 1975) (Danish-Greenlander), filmmaker

== G ==
- Nuka K. Godtfredsen (born 1970), drawing, painting
- Israil Nikodemus Gormansen (Greenlandic Inuit, 1804–57), watercolors

== H ==
- Julie Edel Hardenberg (born 1971), installation, photography, conceptual art
- Isle Hessner (Lise Hessner, born 1962), sculpture
- Aka Høegh (born 1947), Qaqortoq, drawing, public art, sculpture
- Arnannguaq Høegh (born 1956), Nuuk, printmaking, collage
- Bolatta Silis Høegh (Danish–Inuit, born 1981), Denmark, painting, installation, conceptual art
- Inuk Silis Høegh (Danish–Inuit, born 1972), Nuuk, sculpture, installation, performance, graphic arts, film
- Anne-Birthe Hove (1951–2012), printmaking

== J ==
- Hans Jacobi (Greenlandic artist) (1905–1995)
- Miki Jacobsen (born 1965), Denmark, digital photocollages, sculpture, assemblage

== K ==
- Bodil Kaalund (1930–2016) (Danish-Greenlander)
- Lisbeth Karline (born 1981), Nuuk
- Maria Panínguak` Kjærulff (Danish–Inuit, born 1980), Nuuk, painting, drawing, photography, film, video, jewellery, sculpture
- Jessie Kleemann (born 1959), dance, performance art, installation, painting
- Jens Kreutzmann (1828–1899), illustration, painting
- Johannes Kreutzmann (1862–1940), woodcarving
- Lisa Kreutzmann, Kangaatsiaq
- Ole Kreutzmann (1898–1983) (fl. 1940s), Kangaamiut, ivory sculpture
- Frederik Kristensen (born 1952), stone carving, painting
- Peter Kujooq Kristiansen, Nuuk
- Harriet Kristoffersen, painting
- Simon Kristoffersen (1933–1990), sculpture
- Anna Kûitse Thastum (1942–2012), drum dancer
- Kunit of Umiivik (fl. 1880s), wooden map carving
- Kunngi (Frederik Kristensen), painting

== L ==
- Jens Leibhardt (1931–1994), stone carving
- Anne-Lise Løvstrøm (born 1960), Nuuk
- Henrik Lund (Intel'eraq, 1875–1948), painter, lyricist
- Kistat Lund (1944–2017)
- Dine Lyberth, stone carving
- Gerth Lyberth (1867–1929)
- Hans Lynge (1906–1988) known as the founder of modern art in Greenland, impressionist painter, founder of the Nuuk School of Art
- Aviaaja Egede Lynge
- Mikisoq H. Lynge (born 1978), film

== M ==
- Linda Milne, Nuuk
- Mitsivarniannga (fl. 1905), Ammassalik, shaman (angakoq), wooden tupilait
- Gukki Willsen Møller (born 1965), visual art, ceramics
- Lars Møller (19th century), landscape lithography
- Steffen Møller (1882–1909), landscape lithography, son of Lars Møller
- Iben Mondrup, also Iben Mondrup Salto (Danish-Greenlander, born 1969)
- Angu Motzfeldt (born 1976), musician, photography

== N ==
- Nanna Ánike Nikolajsen (born 1984)
- Camilla Nielsen (Greenlandic sculptor) (born 1972), Nuuk

== O ==
- Kristian Olsen aaju (1942–2015), painting, writing

== P ==
- Julia Pars (born 1968), Nuuk, drawing, painting, mixed media
- Buuti Pedersen (Bodil Pedersen, born 1955), Qaqotoq, painting
- Ivaaq Poulsen, sculpture, member of Inuit Youth International

== R ==
- Linda Riber, printmaking, collage
- Ina Rosing (1942–2018)
- Jens Rosing (1925–2008), zoological studies
- Jukke Rosing (Angiuk Rosing), Nuuk, photography
- Kale Rosing (1911–1974), graphics
- Peter Rosing (1871–1938), woodcarving
- Peter Rosing (1892–1965), lithography, brother of Otto Rosing
- Otto Rosing (1896–1966), lithography, brother of Peter Rosing
- Naja Rosing-Advid, Nuuk

== S ==
- Liss Stender, designer, graphic designer
- Ivars Silis (born 1944), photography, videography
- Inuuteq Storch (born 1989), Sisimiut, photography
- Arnajaraq Støvlbæk
- Kitora Sukuvara, stone carving
- Anda Otto Schmidt, (1995) musician, producer

== T ==
- Christian Thygesen (Danish), painter
- Malene Guldager Thygesen (Danish-Kalaalleq), painter, sculptor

== W ==
- Lars Willsen (born 1963), Uummannaq, Musician

== See also ==
- List of Danish painters
- Greenland National Museum
- Katuaq
- Nuuk Art Museum
- Sisimiut Museum
- Qaqortoq Museum
- Upernavik Museum
