= Nuuk School of Art =

- Nunatsinni Eqqumiitsuliornermik Ilinniarfik

Location
- John Møllerip aqq. 5 B-56; Nuuk; Greenland

Information
- Other names: NEI; Greenland's Art School; Grafisk Værksted/Puilanerit
- Type: Art School
- Established: 1972
- Founders: Hans Lynge; Bodil Kaalund
- Head of school: Ivínguak' Stork Høegh
- Enrollment: 5

Nuuk School of Art Nunatsinni Eqqumiitsuliornermik Ilinniarfik (NEI) is a small higher-education arts school in Nuuk, Greenland.

The only arts school in Greenland, Nuuk School of Art offers a one-year program to approximately five students a year. Classes focus on drawing, painting, graphic design and sculpture in both Greenlandic and international traditions. The program cumulates with a graduate showcase at Katuaq.

Many students have gone on from their education at Nuuk School of Art to study art abroad.

== History ==
Hans Lynge and Bodil Kaalund founded a graphic workshop, Grafisk Værksted/Puilanerit, in 1972. They renovated a 2-room former bathhouse in old Nuuk. Their goal was to provide a local school for Greenlanders to train in graphic art. Lynge and Kaalund based their workshop structure off of a similar workshop in Kinngait, Canada.

The government of Greenland took over the school in 1981. The institution was later renamed to Nunatsinni Eqqumiitsuliornermik Ilinniarfik or Greenland's Art School.

Works by students of the school were on display at the Greenland National Museum and Archives in 2022. 100+ works are kept in the museum's collection.

== Staff ==
Arnannguaq Høegh was head of school from 1991 to 2020. Niece and student of Arnannguaq Høegh, Ivínguak' Stork Høegh succeeded her. Ivínguak plans to expand the NEI building in the coming years.

Teachers include local Greenlanders and visiting teachers.

== Notable alumni ==
- Jessie Kleemann
- Nukardleq Najâraq Eva (Aka) Høegh
- Frederik Kristensen (Kunngi)
- Anne-Birthe Hove
- Thue Christiansen
