= Høegh =

Høegh or Höegh may refer to:

== People ==
- Aka Høegh (born 1947), Greenlandic artist
- Arnannguaq Høegh (1956–2020), Greenlandic artist
- Annelise Høegh (born 1948), Norwegian politician
- Daniel Mathias Høegh (born 1991), Danish footballer
- Dennis Høegh (born 1989), Danish footballer
- Hans Høegh (1926–2010), Norwegian businessman
- Leif Høegh (1896–1974), Norwegian shipowner
- Ole Peter Riis Høegh (1806–1852), Norwegian architect
- Simon Karenius Høegh (1810–1893), Norwegian bank treasurer

== Companies ==
- Leif Höegh & Co, an international shipping company

== See also ==
- Høgh, a surname (including a list of people with the name)
