= Ivalo Abelsen =

Greenlandic painter and teacher

- Born: 1971 (age 54–55); Nuuk, Greenland
- Occupation: Teacher/artist
- Years active: 2009–

Ivalo Abelsen (born 1971) is a Greenlandic teacher and artist, most known for a series of postage stamps she produced depicting animal, human and geometric designs relevant to Greenland's history.

== Early life ==
Ivalo Abelsen was born in 1971 in Nuuk, Greenland. She began her basic studies at the Art School in Nuuk and then attended the Aarhus School of Architecture in Denmark for two years. Continuing her education, Abelsen went on the study in Nykøbing Falster at the Teacher Training College of Design, earning her certification to teach in graphic arts and sculpture. Returning to Greenland, she earned her graduate degree from the Institute for Culture and Social History at the University of Greenland.

== Career ==
Abelsen began working at the Midtgrønlands Gymnasiale Skole, known familiarly as GUX-Nuuk, the state gymnasium in 2009, teaching cultural science, history and visual arts. In addition to her teaching, she won a commission that year to design postage stamps for the country. Her first issue, captured the stylized polar bear images carved by the Dorset culture in bone and was done in watercolor and ink. In 2011, she held an exhibit with Hanne Bruun at the Katuaq Cultural Center of Nuuk, with pieces focused on Greenlandic culture. Abelsen's work has also been shown at the Frederiksberg Gardens' Palace Hall, in Copenhagen; the National Museum of Greenland; the North Atlantic House in Copenhagen; and the Nuuk Art Museum.

In 2014, Abelsen was selected to produce a series of four stamps focused on the importance of hunting and sealing to Greenlandic culture. Two stamps were released in that year with the following two in the series released the following year. Each pair could be placed together in a vertical presentation to depict northern and southern variations in fishing techniques and prey. The 2015 series focused on hunting and as in the previous series, could be placed side by side horizontally to provide a cohesive view of the differences of north and south.

In 2017, Abelsen was dismissed from her position as a teacher at the GUX-Nuuk. Administrators stated that there was an oversupply of teachers in her field. Colleagues expressed concern that she was one of the only native-born teachers and one of the few teachers with both educational and cultural training. The case was escalated by the Greenlandic Teachers' Association, amid allegations that Danish nationals received preferential hiring, in spite of a written policy requiring Greenlandic-language speakers to be given priority. The school maintained that the curriculum drove their hiring practices.
