= Ammassalik wooden maps =

Traditional Greenlandic maps carved in wood

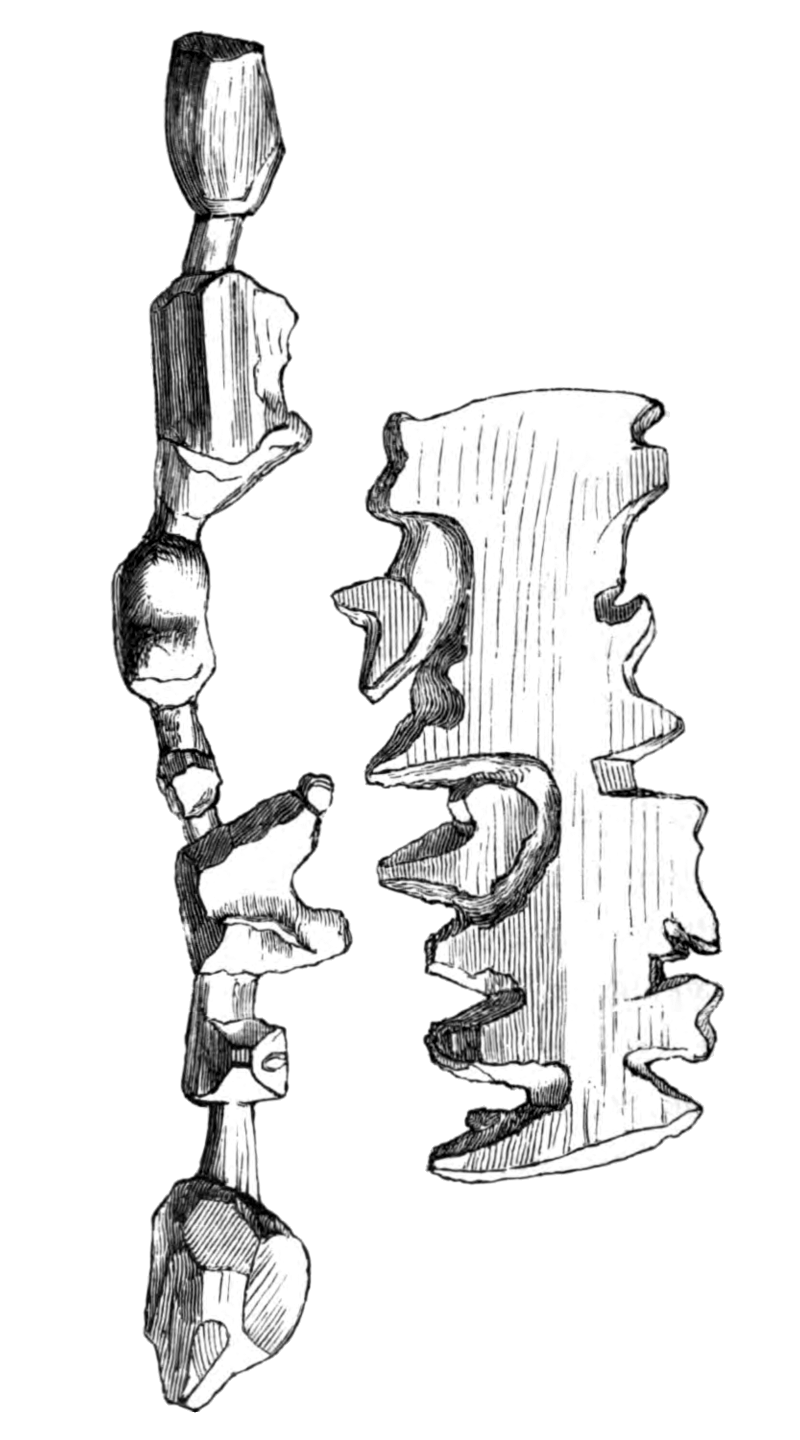
Island map (left) and coast map (right)

Ammassalik wooden maps are carved, tactile maps of the Greenlandic coastlines. In the 1880s, Gustav Holm led an expedition to the Ammassalik (Tasiilaq now) coast of eastern Greenland, where he met several Tunumiit, or East Greenland Inuit communities, whom many believe had no prior direct contact with Europeans. He returned to Denmark with a set of three-dimensional wooden maps of the coast around 66°N 36°W, carved by a native of Umivik named Kunit.

== History ==
Kunit approached Holm on February 8, 1885, and sold the maps representing the coast from Sermiligak to Kangerdlugsuatsiak. Kunit returned on March 21 with another piece representing the peninsula between Sermiligak and Kangerdluarsikajik.

Upon Holm's return, the maps were deposited along with the rest of the collection at the National Museum of Denmark in Copenhagen. As of 1948 the maps were still in Copenhagen; copies were deposited in the Musée d'Ethnographie du Trocadéro in Paris. At some point the maps were transferred to the Greenland National Museum in Nuuk, which was established in the mid-1960s. Woodward & Lewis (1998) write that the "only other known example" of such a map is a specimen at the Michigan State University Museum — item 896.7, 62154 — which is probably a copy of Kunit's work.

In 2000, Post Greenland issued a stamp designed by Anne-Birthe Hove featuring the coastal map, as part of its "Greenland's Cultural Heritage" series. The Greenland National Museum loaned out the maps for a 2007-8 exhibition at the Field Museum of Natural History in Chicago entitled Maps: Finding Our Place in the World, which also traveled to the Walters Art Museum in Baltimore.

== Features ==
	Description given by Kunit to Holm	Sølver	Elkins	Notes
1	Sadlermiut, on the west side of which is the site of an old settlement	66.21°N 35.53°W		
2	Nepinerkit (from napavok), having the shape of a pyramid	66.12°N 35.57°W		
3	Ananak, having the site of an old settlement on the southwest point	66.10°N 35.64°W		Others give the name Ananak to the cape on the mainland directly opposite, calling the island Kajartalik.
4	Aputitek	66.03°N 35.63°W	66.02°N 35.87°W	Sølver's label is closer to the bottom part of the third island than it is to the fourth island.
5	Itivdlersuak	66.01°N 35.76°W	Unidentified	
6	Kujutilik	65.97°N 35.91°W	66.01°N 35.76°W	
7	Sikivitik	65.92°N 36.02°W	Unidentified	
A	Itivdlek, where there are remains of a house	66.32°N 34.85°W	66.30°N 35.47°W	Sølver identifies this feature with Cape Wandel.
B	Sierak, a small fjord, in which salmon are found	66.32°N 35.22°W	66.32°N 35.48°W	Sølver identifies this feature with the fjord Nigertusok, or possibly with the point of land at its elbow.
C	Sarkarmiut, where there are remains of a house	66.27°N 35.19°W	66.30°N 35.53°W	Sølver identifies this feature with Cape Japetus Steenstrup.
D	Kangerdlugsuatsiak, a fjord of such length that a kayak can not even in a whole day row from the mouth to the head of the fjord and back again	66.25°N 35.35°W	66.29°N 35.65°W	Sølver places this feature on the fjord marked Sarkarmiut in the map. Elkins places it farther inland.
E	Erserisek, a little fjord	66.24°N 35.57°W	66.23°N 35.62°W	Sølver and Elkins almost agree on this feature; Elkins places the label farther inland, while Sølver includes part of the Odesund.
F	Nutugkat, a little fjord with a creek at the bottom	66.13°N 35.67°W		
G	Merkeriak, kayak portage from Nutugkat to Erserisek along the bank of the creek, when the heavy ice blocks the headland between the two fjords	66.21°N 35.77°W		
H	Ikerasakitek, a bay in which the land ice goes straight out to the sea			
I	Kangerajikajik, a cape			
J	Kavdlunak, a bay into which runs a creek			
K	Apusinek, a long stretch where the land ice passes out into the sea.			
L	Tatorisik			
M	Iliartalik, a fjord with a smaller creek			
N	Nuerniakat			
O	Kugpat			
P	Igdluarsik			
Q	Sangmilek, a little fjord with a creek			
R	Nutugkat			
S	Amagat			
T	Kangerdluarsikajik, a smaller fjord			
U	Kernertuarsik			

== Related maps ==
- Marshall Islands stick chart
- Straight-line diagram
