= Julie Edel Hardenberg =

Julie Edel Hardenberg (born 1971) is a Greenlandic photographer whose picture books include The Quiet Diversity. Kuuk, curated by her and Iben Mondrup and hosted by The Nordic Institute in Greenland, explored Greenlandic identity.
