= Kistat Lund =

Greenlandic graphic artist, painter and schoolteacher (1944–2017)

Kîstat Lund
- Born: 11 October 1944; Ammassivik, Nanortalik, South Greenland
- Died: 8 January 2017 (aged 72); Qaqortoq, Kujalleq, Greenland
- Occupations: Illustrator; Graphic artist; Painter; School teacher
- Spouse: Frank Vraa
- Children: 2
- Awards: Knight of the Order of the Dannebrog

Kîstat Lund (11 October 1944 – 8 January 2017) was a Greenlandic graphic artist, illustrator, painter and schoolteacher. Educated at GU Nuuk High School and Viborg Katedralskole, she began drawing and painting while she was in high school and she worked with the techniques of painting in airbrush, acrylic, graphics, oil, paper cuts, pastel paintings, reliefs, tapestry weave templates and watercolour. Lund created art that was commissioned by conference rooms, institutions and schools. She was also a teacher at Narsap Atuarfia in Narsaq from 1975 after training as a teacher. Lund received scholarships and awards for her work and she was appointed Knight of the Order of the Dannebrog in 1997.

== Early life ==
Lund was born in the village of Ammassivik, Nanortalik, South Greenland on 11 October 1944. She was the daughter of the grocer Bertha Lund Poulsen. Lund was brought up in Ammassivik, residing with her grandparents when she was between the ages of four and twelve before moving into her mother's home in Qaqortoq to find better educational opportunities. She spent much of her childhood drawing, and met the Greenlandic preacher and poet Henrik Lund and the artist Hans Lynge, which made her curious. Lund graduated from GU Nuuk High School in 1963 and from Viborg Katedralskole three years later.

== Career ==
Her drawing and painting career began in high school, and she received the support from a teacher who gave her the necessary materials to work in the visual arts. Lund trained as a primary school teacher in lining at Hjørring Seminarium and graduated from the educational institution in 1970. Starting in 1975, she was employed as a teacher at Narsap Atuarfia in Narsaq, South Greenland. Lund did a one-year painting course under the visual artist Karin Nathorst Westfelt at the Danish Teacher Training College from the period between 1986 and 1987.

From 1974, she exhibited her works solo in Denmark, Greenland and Iceland as well as being a part of group exhibitions in Alaska, Canada, Denmark, Germany, Greenland, Japan and the rest of Scandinavia between 1986 and 1992. Lund won the Malene Lund Legacy Award in 1984; each of the Dronn. Ingrid's Legacy and the Greenland Home Rule Culture Prizes (the latter with fellow artist Aka Høegh) in 1989 as well as the C. Godtfredsens Legacy in 1994. Her works are featured in the 1988 book Mads Lidegaard i: Grønland set gennem 50 års frimærker, the 1990 works Mâliâraq Vebæk: Navaranaaq og andre and Bodil Kaalund: Grønlands Kunst as well as the local press in both 1993 and 1995. She was on the municipality of Narsaq's museum committee starting in 1980, of the Kulturhuset in Qaqortoq from 1983 and of the Greenland Home Rule Culture Council between 1987 and 1990.

== Personal life ==
Lund has two children, and she was married to the teacher Frank Vraa from 18 January 1978. She was appointed Knight of the Order of the Dannebrog in 1997. On the evening of 8 January 2017, Lund died at the Napparsimavik Hospital in Qaqortoq.

== Technique ==
She worked with the techniques of airbrush, acrylic, graphics, oil, paper cuts, pastel paintings, reliefs, tapestry weave templates and watercolour. Lund frequently omitted people from her works and her art was commissioned several times by conference rooms, institutions and schools. Stine Lundberg Hansen wrote that Lund was sensitive to colour, detail, watercolour on the harsh and imposing nature, observed in how she painted in soft, warm colours and simplified the subject's construction. With reliefs, her inspiration was the appropriate cultural features and myths to the institutions she worked with. Lund's inspiration for motifs originated from South Greenland's nature and Greenlandic legends.
