= Maria Panínguakʼ Kjærulff =

Greenlandic artist

- Born: 1980 (age 45–46); Copenhagen
- Education: NSCAD University; Cooper Union
- Known for: Painting
- Notable work: Skovkalkuner (painting)

Maria Panínguakʼ Kjærulff (born 1980) is a Greenlandic Inuk artist and actor.

Her art has been exhibited in the National Museum of Greenland and is on permanent display at the Nuuk Art Museum. Kjærulff has been commissioned to produce art for four Greenlandic postage stamps.

As an actor, she played a nurse in the 2009 film Nuummioq.

== Early life and education ==
Kjærulff was born 1980 in Copenhagen to a Greenlandic Inuk mother and a Danish father. She moved to Greenland at the age of six.

Kjærulff received her high school education in Minnesota, USA. She has a bachelor's degree in fine arts from the Nova Scotia College of Art & Design in Halifax, Canada, which included work at Cooper Union for the Advancement of Science and Art in New York City, USA.

== Career ==
Kjærulff is primarily known for her painting and her style of using broad and expressive brush strokes. She has also worked as an actor, playing a nurse in the 2009 Greenlandic film Nuummioq.

Her first solo exhibition was held in 2006 at the National Museum of Greenland entitled Tingerlaaq (English: First Flight). The exhibition included her 2004 painting Skovkalkuner (English: Turkeys), which is currently displayed in the Nuuk Art Museum’s permanent collection. Also in the collection is her 2008 painting of the concrete residential buildings in Nuuk.

In 2019, Kjærulff created the art used in a Greenlandic postage stamp, the fourth stamp she was commissioned to paint. Proceeds of the sale of the stamp benefited the Salvation Army.
