= Nuuk Tourist Office =

Landmark in Nuuk, Greenland

Coordinates: 64°10′35.1″N 51°44′47.3″W

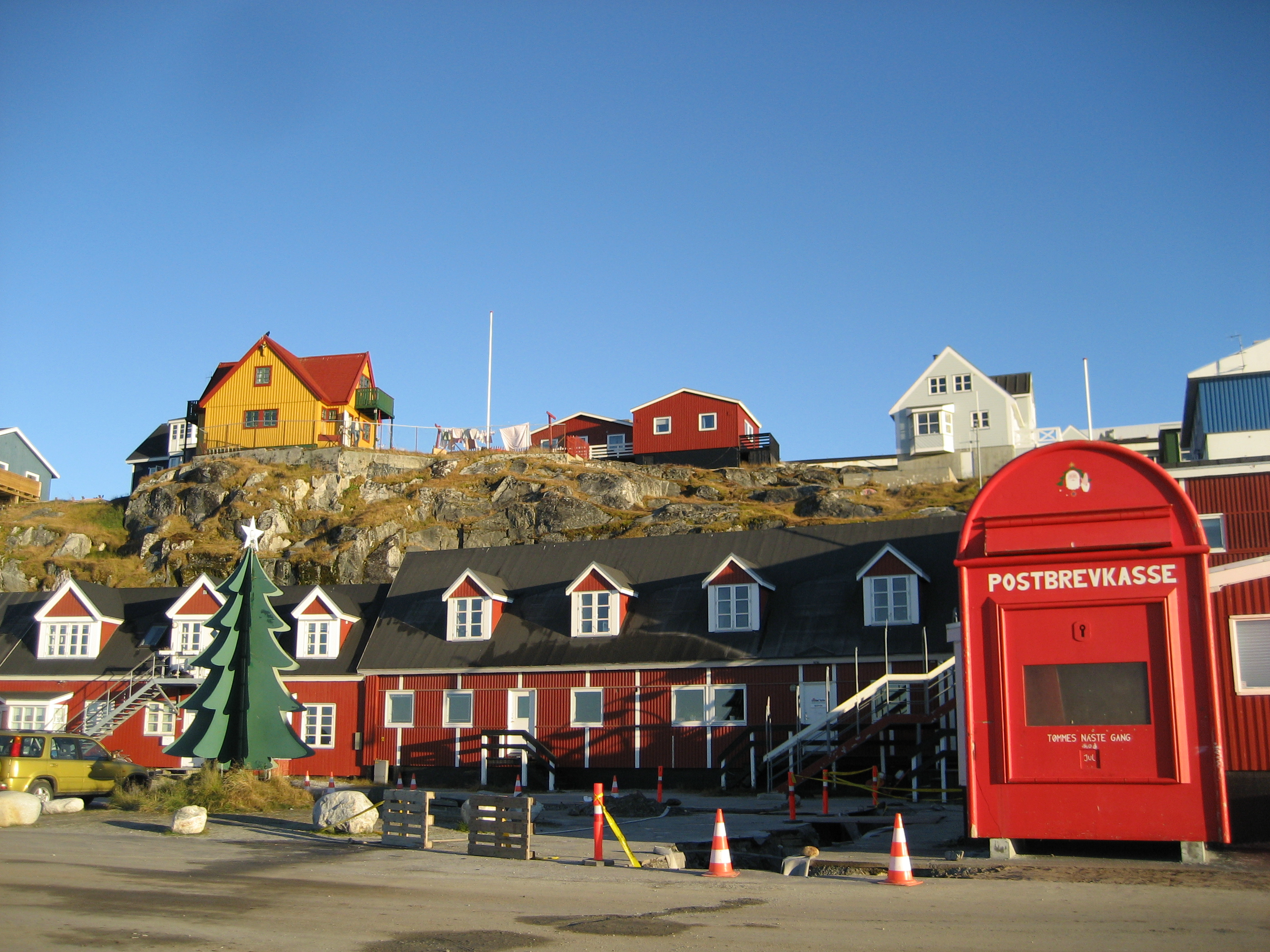
Nuuk Tourist Office

Nuuk Tourist Office is a landmark in Nuuk, Greenland, built in 1992 to house the headquarters of the new National Tourist Board of Greenland. It was built to not only provide information to tourists but as an attraction, with a fake Christmas tree and an extremely large postal box.

== See also ==
- Visitor center
