= Høgh =

Høgh is a Danish surname which was derived from the Old Norse word Haugr meaning a hill or mound.

Notable people with the name include:

- Alex Høgh Andersen (born 1994), Danish actor
- Jes Høgh (born 1966), Danish footballer
- Jonas Høgh-Christensen (born 1981), Danish sailor
- Kasper Høgh (born 2000), Danish footballer
- Lars Høgh (1959–2021), Danish footballer
- Nicolai Høgh (born 1983), Danish footballer
- Sigvart Høgh-Nilsen (born 1880), Norwegian pianist and composer

== See also ==
- Ralf de la Hogh (fl. 1384–1395), English politician
- Høegh (disambiguation)
