= Straight-line diagram =

Stylized road diagram

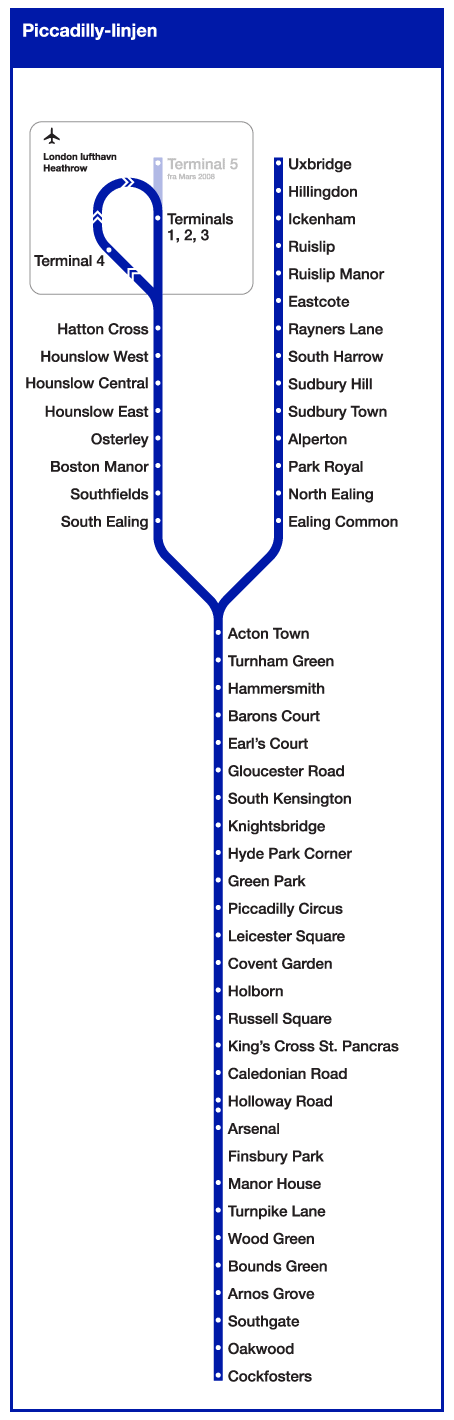
This straight line diagram illustrates the stops on the Piccadilly Line, part of London's Underground.

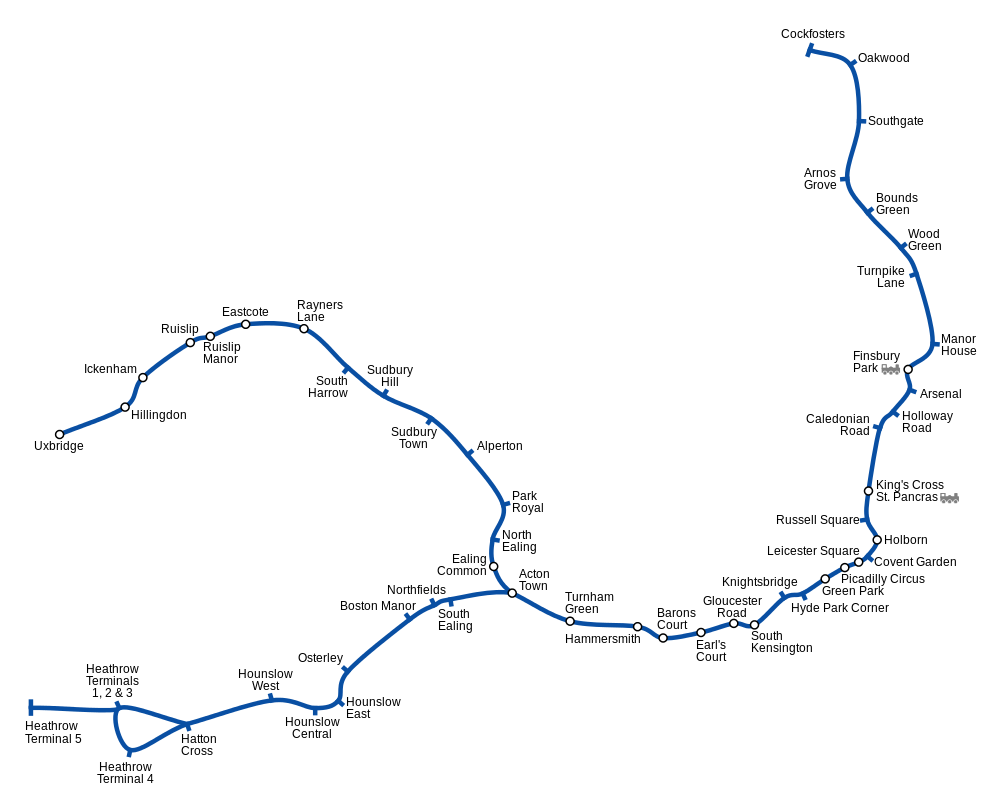
This is a more accurately rendered map of the Piccadilly Line, showing curvature and the relative distance between stops. It illustrates why straight-line maps are more useful when only the sequence of stops is relevant.

A straight-line diagram (abbreviated SLD) is a diagram of a road where the road is shown as a straight line. Such diagrams are usually produced by a highway department, and display features along the road, including bridges and intersecting roads. Rows below the diagram show data about the road, usually including speed limit, number of lanes, bridge numbers, and historical data, among other data. Subway lines also frequently employ straight-line diagrams. An internal SLD viewing system may also include links to other internal data, including photos or plans. Public SLDs are distributed in formats including PDF and TIFF.

Straight-line diagrams were historically used in transportation planning but have been supplanted for these purposes by geographic information systems.

A strip map is a road map laid out similarly to a straight-line diagram, featuring the same details found in more conventional road maps rather than technical details. In the United States, some strip maps are distributed by state highway departments. In Australia, strip maps are distributed by state automobile associations. In the early 20th century, scrolling strip maps were also a component of some forerunners to satellite navigation devices. One wristwatch introduced in 1927 came with strip maps to be scrolled by hand. The 1932 Iter-Avto was a car-mounted device that scrolled the strip map automatically based on dead reckoning with the speedometer.

== Gallery ==
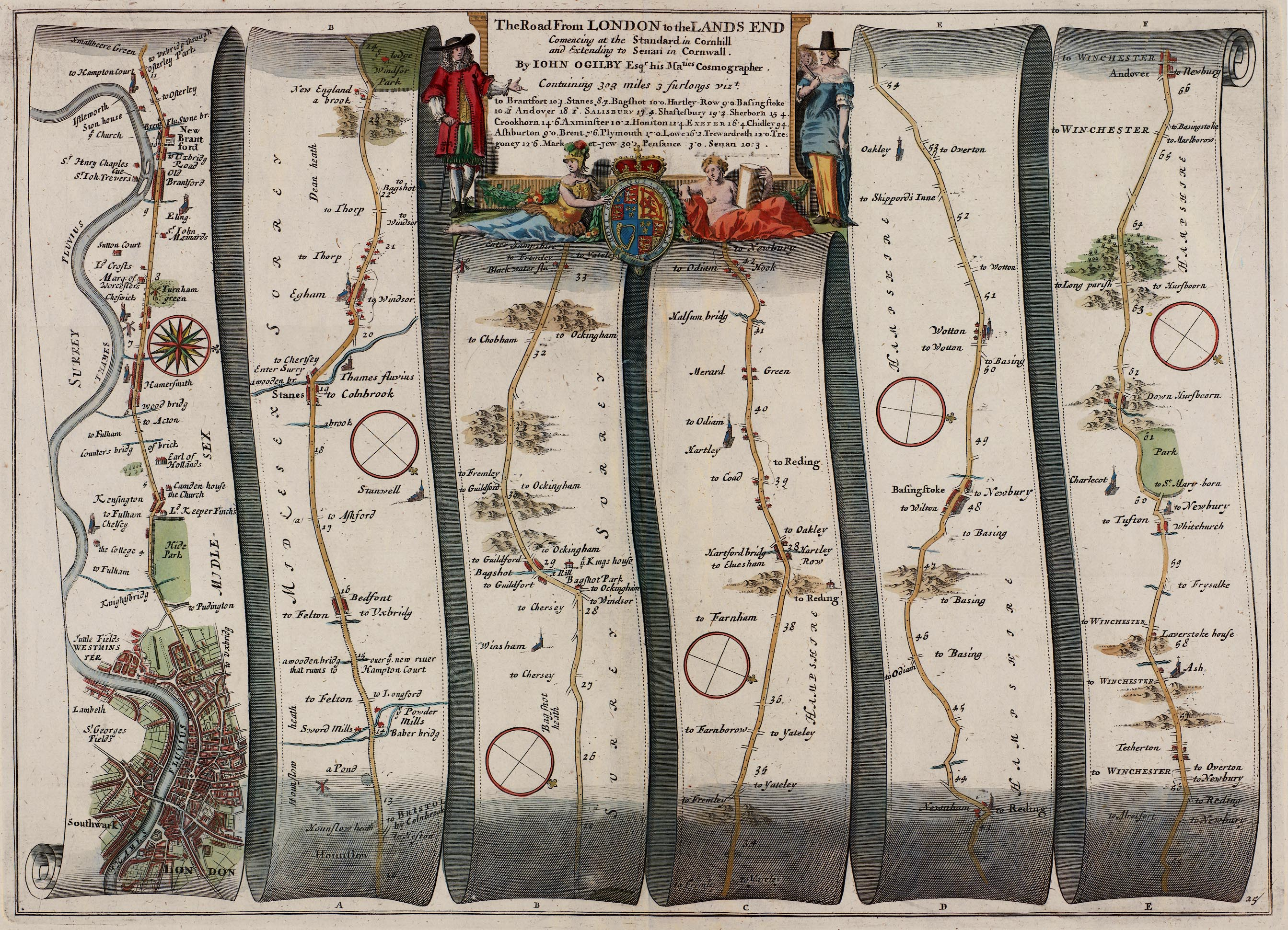
"The Road From London to the Lands End" from Ogilby's Britannia (1675)

== See also ==
- Ammassalik wooden maps
- Gantt chart
- Schematic
- Timeline
