= Jens Rosing =

Greenlandic artist (1925–2008)

- Born: July 28, 1925; Ilulissat, Greenland
- Died: May 24, 2008 (aged 82)
- Spouse: Dagny Rosing (m. 1952)

Jens Christian Rosing (28 July 1925 – 24 May 2008) was a notable Greenlandic artist, author and storyteller. He designed the coat of arms of Greenland, many Greenlandic postage stamps, as well as illustrated children's books and created diverse works of art.

== Life ==
Rosing was born in 1925 in Ilulissat (Jakobshavn), Greenland, son of priest and artist Otto Rosing. In 1947–1948, he was a student at the Akademiet for Fri og Merkantil Kunst in Denmark. In 1952, he married Dagny Rosing (maiden name Nielsen), who is Danish. That year, Rosing introduced domesticated reindeer to Nuup Kangerlua, and he managed a reindeer station in Itinnera along one of the fjords near Nuuk until 1959. He and his family lived for many years in a suburb of Copenhagen, Denmark.

Jens and Dagny Rosing had 3 boys and one girl.

== Career ==
=== Greenlandic Traditions ===
Rosing focused on understanding, interpreting and sharing Greenlandic traditions. He told stories in words, images and sculptures. By 1999, he had published 4 books in Greenlandic, 13 books and articles in Danish, and 1 book in English in addition to illustrating another 17 books, many for children. Rosing also made several films documenting Greenlandic Inuit traditional activities, particular hunting. A full listing of his published contributions includes 145 works in 305 publications in 8 languages.

=== Stamp Design ===
Rosing was known as the number one stamp designer for Greenland. Throughout his 50-year career, Rosing produced 130 stamp designs. His first design was produced in 1957 and was a commemorative stamp for Greenland. It had a scene featured on it from the Mother of the Sea. There are two versions of the stamp. The first stamp was printed in 1957 in a green-blue color, and the 1961 reprint was in blue.

In 1962, another stamp was created from Drum Dance, and in 1966 a stamp showing The Boy and the Fox was created. In 1985, the coat of arms stamp was designed by Rosing. The stamp does feature a standing polar bear, in which Rosing did not design. The last stamp was created in 2007. It features dogs pulling a sled in an unknown place in Greenland. More complete listings of the stamps designed by Rosing from 1957 to 1995 can be found in and from 1995 to 1998 in.

All Greenlandic stamps were printed in only one color until the 1980s. Beginning in 1985, stamps became printed in offset, or in a combination of offset and recess-type printing. The later versions are brighter. However, they fail to show the appearance of the one color recess printing stamps.

=== Qilakitsoq Mummies ===
Rosing was curator and director of the Greenland National Museum in 1976-1978 when he saw photographs of the Qilakitsoq mummies. He realized their significance and initiated their excavation and study. In his book "The Sky Hangs Low", Rosing describes the find and results from scientific studies of the mummies in the context of Greenlandic Inuit culture. Rosing's line drawings and watercolors illustrate key features of the mummies, particularly details of their clothing.

== Awards ==
- Danish Writers Association's popular science prize, 1979
- Greenland Christmas Seal Committee's prize, 1983
- Greenland Home Rule's Culture Prize, 1985
- Danish State Art Foundation's life-long grant, 1989
- Greenland Home Rule's Decoration for Meritorious Services, 1997

== Publications ==
- The Sky Hangs Low, Penumbra Press, 1986
- Hvis vi vågner til havblik, Borgens Forlag, Copenhagen, 1993
- Si nous nous réveillons par temps calme ..., éditions Paulsen, Paris 2007
- Things and Wonders, the Norsemen in Greenland and America, Gavia, Humlebæk, 2000

== Sources ==
- Jens Rosing's biography on Inuit.uqam.ca
- Brunstrom, C. [2010]. Jens Rosing: Greenland’s Grand Old Man .
- Pasternack, Simon [1999]. Oqaluttuartoq Jens Rosing, Fortaelleren Jens Rosing, Jens Rosing the Storyteller
