= Bolatta Silis-Høegh =

Greenlandic artist

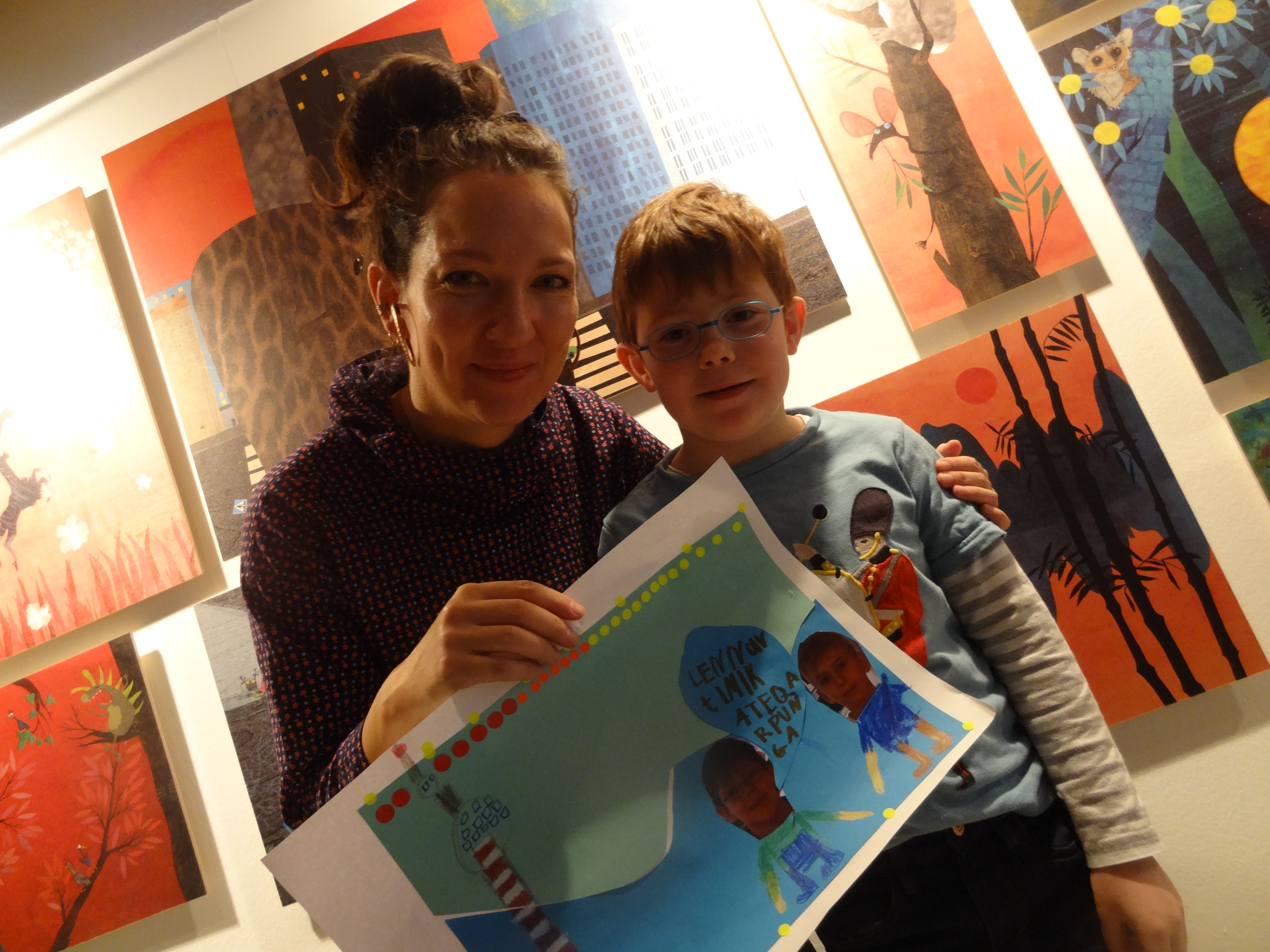
- Silis Høegh at an illustration workshop in the Nordic Embassies in Berlin, 2018
- Born: Bolatta Tatjana Paarnaq Silis-Høegh; 1981 (age 44–45); Qaqortoq, Greenland
- Education: Aarhus Art Academy
- Known for: Contemporary art and children's literature
- Notable work: Haveforeningen Sisimiut 2068 (exhibit); Aima qaa schhh! (children's book)
- Family: Aka Høegh (mother); Ivars Silis (father); Inuk Silis Høegh (brother)
- Awards: Nordic Council Children and Young People's Literature Prize (2016 nominee)

Bolatta Silis-Høegh is a Greenlandic contemporary artist and children's book author and illustrator who lives in Denmark.

She is the daughter of artist Aka Høegh and the sister of artist Inuk Silis-Høegh.

Silis-Høegh is best known for her Haveforeningen Sisimiut 2068 piece on climate change. Her 2014 children's book Aima qaa schhh! was nominated for a Nordic Council Children and Young People’s Literature Prize.

In 2015 and 2016 she toured with two exhibits, both reflecting on uranium mining in Greenland.

== Early life and education ==
Silis-Høegh was born in 1981 in Qaqortoq, Greenland to Latvian photographer and videographer father Ivars Silis and Greenlandic artist Aka Hoegh. Her brother, Inuk Silis-Høegh, is nine years older.

She graduated from Aarhus Art Academy in 2006.

== Art career ==
Silis-Høegh works as a contemporary artist in multiple mediums which combines American pop culture with traditional Greenlandic cultural influences.

She first exhibited outside Greenland in 2005 at The North Atlantic House where her exhibit Den røde snescooter (English: The Red Snowmobile) was displayed alongside other Greenlandic artists.

Her best known work is Haveforeningen Sisimiut 2068 (English: Allotment Garden 2068) a three dimensional representation of a traditional Greenland allotment, set in the year 2068 and filled tropical plants and animals, a playful reflection on the impact of climate change. The piece won a Danish Arts Foundation award in 2010.

In 2015 and 2016, in response to the Greenlandic government's 2013 lifting of the moratorium on uranium mining, Silis-Høegh's toured with her Light On Lights Off exhibit. Also in 2016, her exhibition STORM was shown at Nordatlantens Brygge; the exhibit included themes of anger, politics, and environmentalism.

== Publications ==
Silis-Høegh published her first children's book Aima in 2011 and the 2014 sequel Aima qaa schhh! was nominated for the 2016 Nordic Council Children and Young People’s Literature Prize. Aima qaa schhh! is a 32-page book featuring Aima as the protagonist and her relationship with her imaginary friend Manna. The book includes a wide range of art by Silis-Høegh.

- Aima (Danish Greenlandic), Milk Publishing, 2011, ISBN 978-87-91359-77-4
- Aima qaa schhh (English, Danish, Greenlandic) Milk Publishing, 2014 ISBN 978-87-92790-27-9
- Aima meets the Mother of the Mountain (English, Danish, Greenlandic) Milk Publishing, 2020, ISBN 978-87-93941-13-7

== Personal life ==
In 2014, Silis-Høegh lived in Vesterbro, Copenhagen, Denmark with her husband and their two children.
