= Jessie Kleemann =

Danish (Greenlandic) artist and writer

Marie Jessie Kleemann
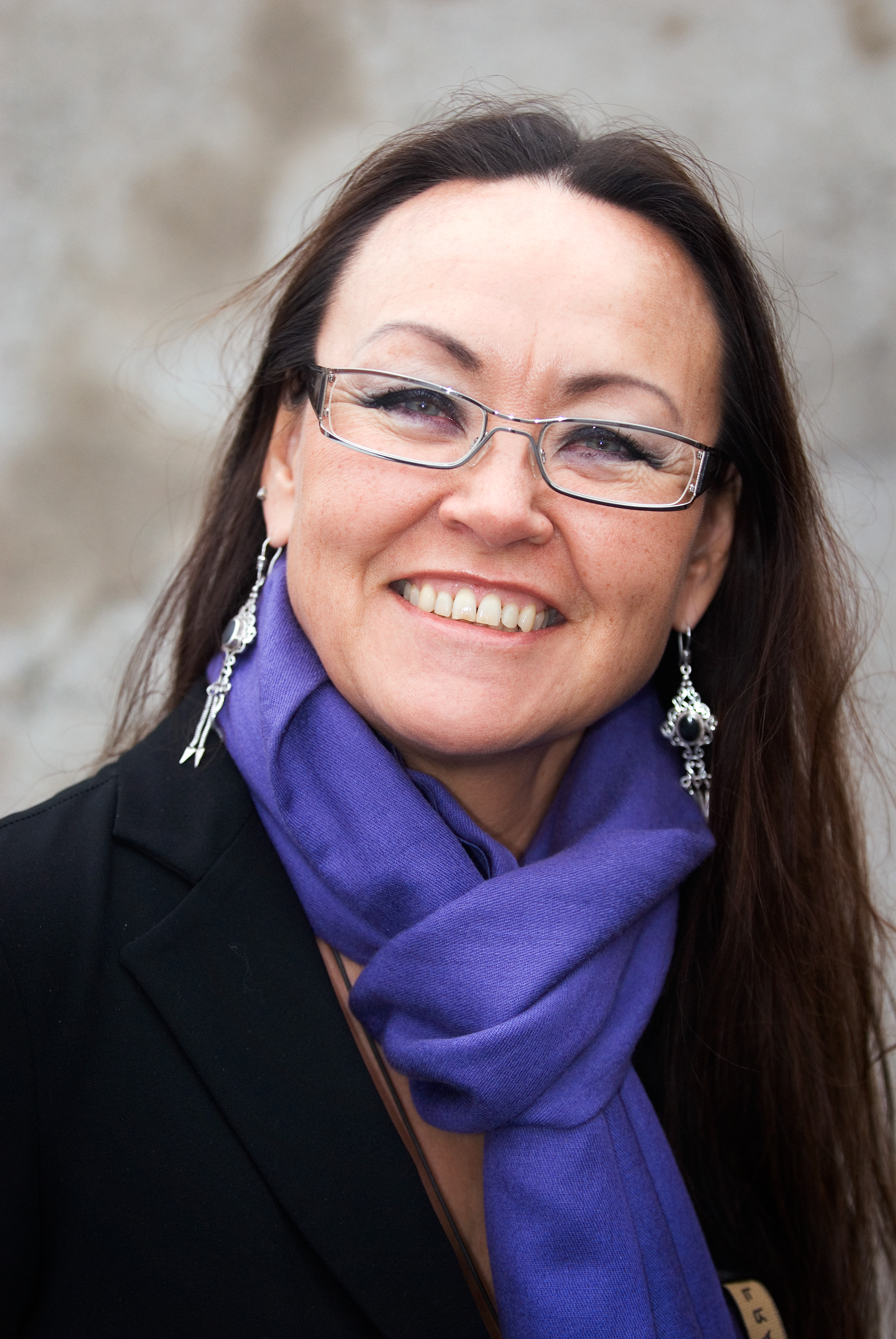
- Jessie Kleeman (2007)
- Born: Jensine Marie Kristensen; November 6, 1959 (age 66); Upernavik
- Known for: performance art and poetry
- Website: jessiekleemann.com

Marie Jessie Kleemann (née Jensine Marie Kristensen, born 1959) is a Greenlandic artist and writer. Educated both as an actor and a graphic artist, from 1984 to 1991 she headed Greenland's College of Art in Nuuk. Now recognized principally as a performance artist expressing Inuit themes in music and dance, her innovative poetry has featured in international festivals. Kleemann now lives and works in Copenhagen where she strives to revive Greenland's cultural heritage.

== Early life and education ==
Born in Upernavik on the north-west coast of Greenland on 6 November 1959, Jensine Marie Kristensen is the daughter of the fisherman Arkaluk Kleemann and Vilhelmina Kristensen, a seamstress. In December 1978, she changed her name to Marie Jessie Kleemann. In September 1994 in Nuuk, she married the Danish lawyer Claus Roland Andresassen. She first studied drama at the Greenlandic Tukak Theatre in Fjaltring, Jutland (1978–79), before attending the Graphics Workshop in Nuuk (1979–80). In the early 1980s, she continued her studies in Canada and Finland's Sápmi.

== Career ==
From 1984 to 1991, Kleemann headed Greenland's College of Art in Nuuk although she regretted the school's lack of interest in Greenland's traditional culture. As a poet, she has not published many books but she is nevertheless regarded as one of Greenland's most experimental writers. While she has attended many international poetry festivals and her poems have been used as a basis for films such as Ivalo Frank's Killer Bird (2015), it was not until 1997 that she published her first collection of poetry in Danish and English as Taallat – Digte – Poems. Her latest collection Arkhticós Dolorôs exhibits symbols and figures from traditional Greenlandic culture in her attempt to inspire a new look at the effects of climate change on the melting Arctic. She adopts, for example, the legendary Mother of the Sea as a symbol representing pollution and catastrophe.

Inspired by Barry Lopez's Arctic Dreams, Kleemann had already used the title Arkhticós Doloros for her 2019 video performance recorded on the Sermeq Kujalleq glacier in the west of Greenland. Kleemann's installation ORSOQ (2012) incorporating bottles of seal oil has recently been acquired by the National Gallery of Denmark.
