= Anna Kûitse Thastum =

Greenlandic drum dancer (1942 – 2012)

- Born: 1942; Kulusuk, Greenland
- Died: July 13, 2012 (aged 69–70)

Anna Kûitse Thastum (1942 – 13 July 2012) was a Greenlandic drum dancer. Born in Kulusuk, she lived variously in the United States and Denmark, before resettling there again. She was awarded a prize by the Greenlandic government in 2008 for her contributions to the culture of Greenland.

== Early life ==
Anna Kûitse Thastum was born in Kulusuk among 13 siblings in 1942. She said her grandfather, named Kûitse, was a piniartorsuaq—great hunter—who killed several polar bears. All of her siblings were drum dancers, as well as her parents; the practice, used in ceremonies, had been banned by early Christian settlers in Greenland. When her sisters had left their home, she took care of her father until 1966, when he died.

After his death, she married an American and moved to the United States, and then returned in 1984. She remarried the next year to a Dane, Arvid Thatsum, and moved to Denmark, where she lived for four years, returning again to Kulusuk. She met both of her husbands at DYE-4, an early-warning defense system put in place by the United States government at Kulusuk.

== Career ==
She began drum dancing again after her final return to Kulusuk. After the completion of an airport in the town, she and her brother performed a drum dance for the audience. She taught drum dancing to the children of her community, and nurtured the art practice.

In 2008, Thastum was awarded with a cultural prize by the minister for culture, Tommy Marø. The prize is for awarded annually for outstanding contributions to the culture of Greenland. After being awarded the prize, she went on a tour in Italy and the United States, then taught drum dancing to children in Kulusuk and Tasiilaq. She had asked for drum dancing to be considered a part of UNESCO's list of cultural heritage practices. She was profiled in the 2010 film ECHOES, discussing her views on her life: there was "lots of sadness" but "I'm still alive".

== Death ==
She died on 13 July 2012, following a long illness.
