= Moravian Brethren Mission House =

Historical building in Nuuk, Greenland

Coordinates: 64°10′8″N 51°44′44″W

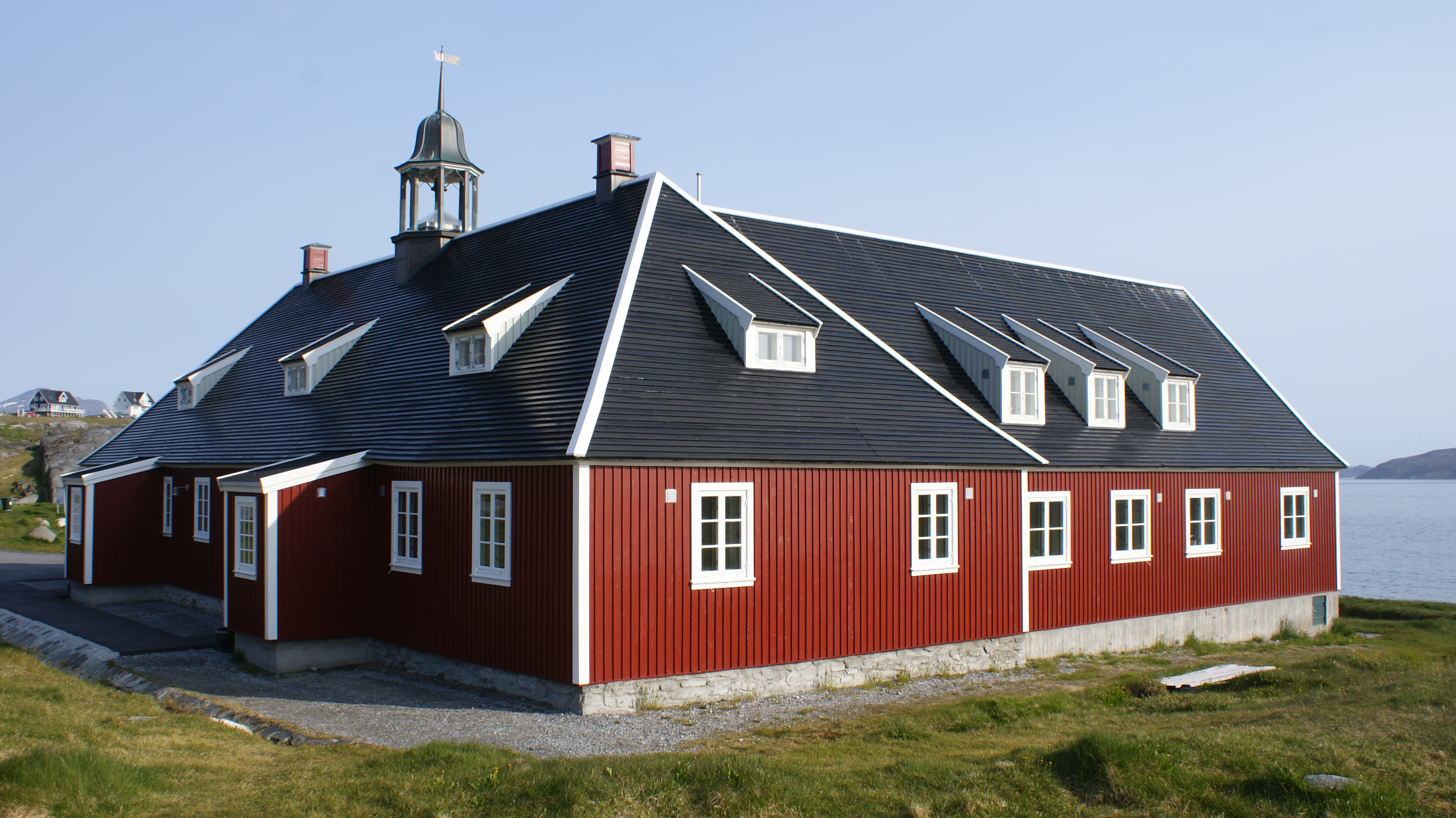
Moravian Brethren Mission House

Moravian Brethren Mission House or Herrnhut House (Danish: Herrnhuthuset) is a historical building in Nuuk, the capital of Greenland, established in 1747 from timber shipped to the United Brethren from the Netherlands. It was the centre of the Moravian Brethren Mission in Greenland and the missionaries operated across the west coast of Greenland from this building. Greenlander converts were reported saying, "If it can be so beautiful here on Earth, how wonderful must it not be in Heaven."

The building is current used as the office of the Ombudsman of Greenland ('Ombudsmanden for Inatsisartut').

== Location ==
The building is located on the southern outskirts of the Nuuk, west of Queen Ingrid's Hospital. Perched at the southern endpoint of a large peninsula, it overlooks the Nuup Kangerlua fjord, at the point where it leaves the mountainous region, with only a group of skerries at its wide mouth. Immediately to the north of the house, there is a cemetery which the Moravians operated as a God's Acre.

== See also ==
- Moravian missions in Greenland
