= Nuuk Art Museum =

Museum in Greenland

Coordinates: 64.177860°N 51.729216°W

- Nuuk Kunstmuseum
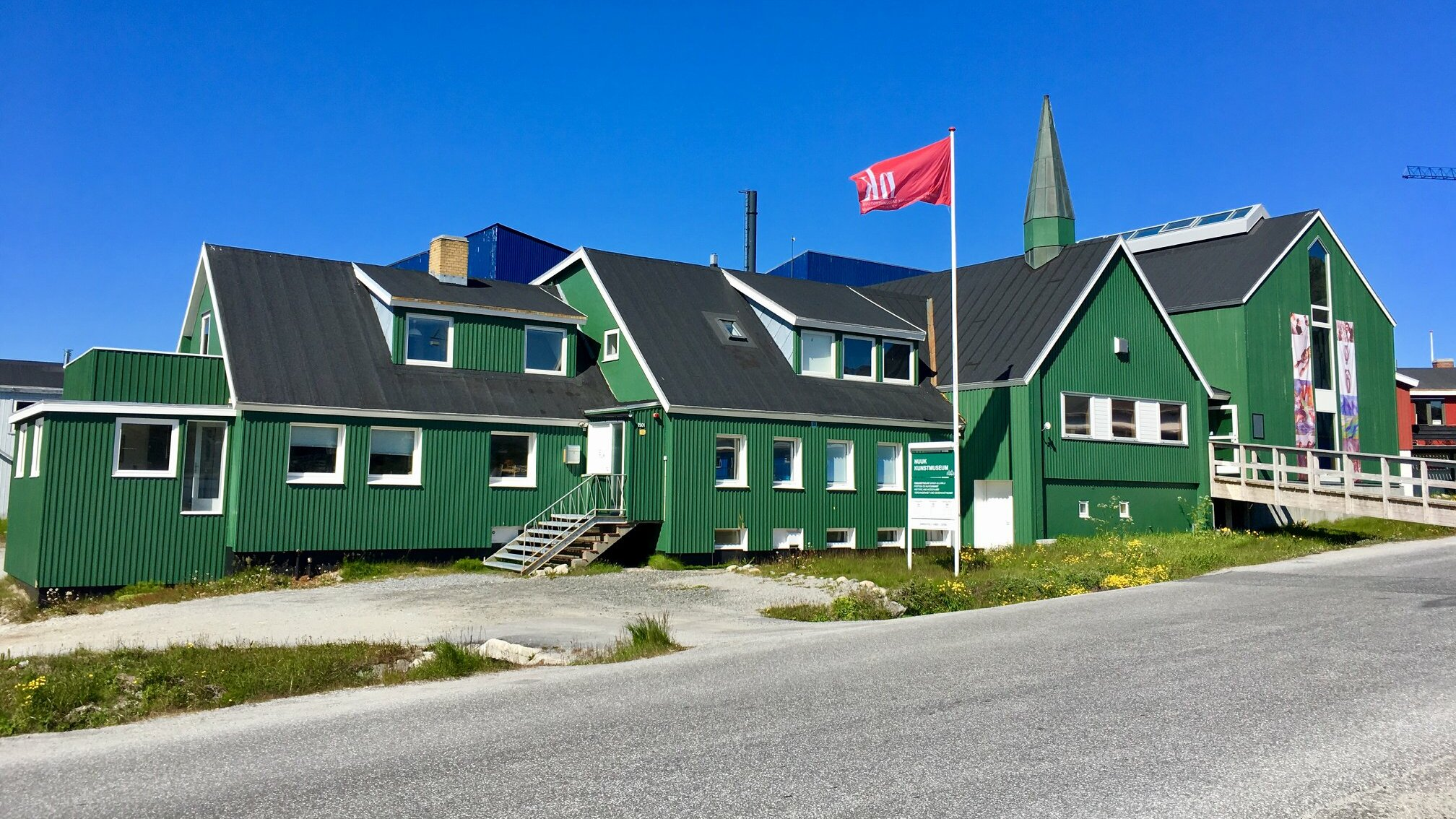
- Established: 2005
- Location: Nuuk, Greenland
- Type: Art museum
- Website: https://www.nuukkunstmuseum.com/

Nuuk Art Museum (Danish: Nuuk Kunstmuseum) is a local museum in Greenland, located in Nuuk, the capital. The museum contains a notable collection of paintings, watercolors, drawings, graphics, figures in soapstone, ivory, and wood, with many items collected by the businessman Svend Junge. Of particular note is a collection of over 150 paintings by Emanuel A. Petersen.

== Establishment ==
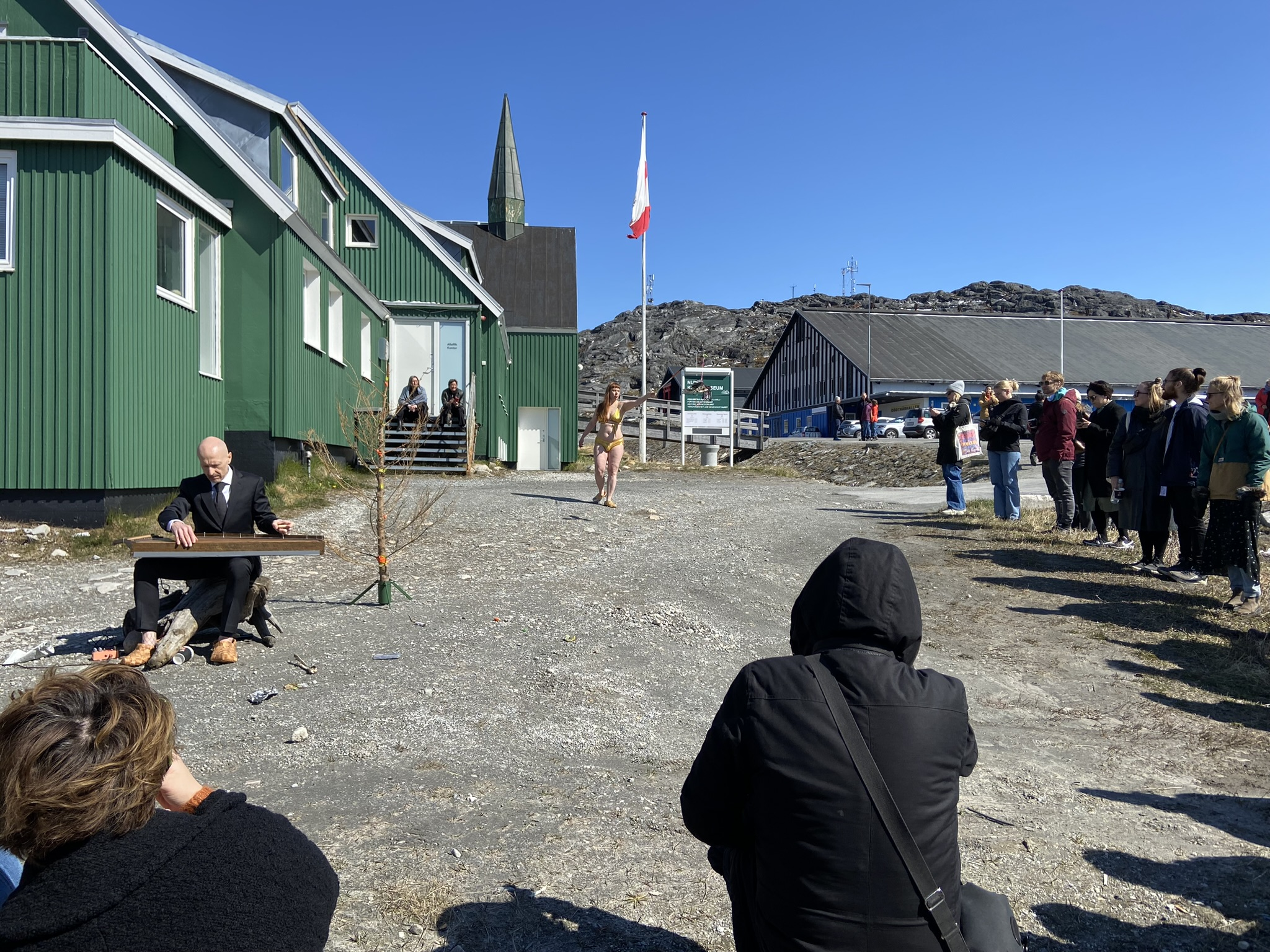
Performance Art from Finland outside the Museum: Kainulainen & Latva.

The museum was founded on 22 May 2005, occupying a former Seventh-day Adventist Church building in Kissarneqqortuunnguaq, Nuuk. The museum was donated to the citizens of the Kommuneqarfik Sermersooq (then Nuuk Municipality) by Svend and Helene Junge and inaugurated on 21 June 2007, Greenland National Day.

Nuuk Art Museum exhibits around 250 paintings, watercolors, photographs, drawings, graphics and paintings, as well as around 50 figures in bone, tusk, wood and soapstone. The museum is around 600 square meters and includes an extension for changing exhibitions. The permanent collection includes an extensive selection of older art by European artists who have lived in Greenland for varying durations. These are artists such as Christine Deichmann (1869-1945), J.E.C. Rasmussen (1841-1893), Harald Moltke (1871-1960) and Emanuel A. Petersen (1894-1948). The permanent collection also displays recent works by Greenlandic artists such as Simon Kristoffersen (1933-1990), Miki Jacobsen (b. 1965), Buuti Pedersen (b. 1955), Hans Lynge (1906-1988), Anne-Birthe Hove (1951-2012) and Pia Arke (1958-2007).

The collection is curated with a focus on how Greenland has been viewed by outside artists and how local artists view Greenland. This makes it possible to look at the interplay between traditional and new expressions.

In recent years, the museum has worked on various projects that allow visitors to experience the highlights of the museum's permanent collection via an audio guide and explore the urban space with the museum's artwalk. In addition, educational material has been developed for several grade levels and high schools.

== See also ==
- List of Greenlandic artists
