= Qilakitsoq =

Archaeological site in Greenland

Coordinates: 70°36′31″N 52°10′55″W

- Present location: Nuussuaq Peninsula, Greenland

Location
- Qilakitsoq (Greenland)

Qilakitsoq (Greenlandic pronunciation: [qilakit͡sɔq]) is an abandoned settlement and an important archaeological site in Greenland. It is the location of the discovery of eight mummified corpses from the Thule period. These Inuit mummies offer important insights into the lives of Inuit about 500 years ago.

== Location and setting ==
Qilakitsoq lies on the north coast of the Nuussuaq Peninsula in western Greenland, across the water from Uummannaq. It occupies a small inlet that opens westward onto the Uummannaq Fjord system. The inlet cuts into the coast, forming a harbour sheltered from most winds.

From the water, the ground rises gently from the shore before meeting steep mountains. This narrow stretch between harbour and mountains is the setting of Qilakitsoq. Its shelter had a limit: strong winter winds and currents could break up the sea ice, making seal hunting on the ice difficult.

== Settlement history ==
Qilakitsoq was used over several centuries, leaving traces of different kinds of homes along the shore. Archaeologists mapped eleven house and tent remains. Some of the oldest-looking dwellings have worn down to low, rounded outlines in the ground. A larger winter house appears to have been built in the 1700s and altered in the 1800s.

The best-preserved winter house still shows how it was built: layers of turf and stone form its walls, and its entrance passage bends away from the sea. Archaeologists also recorded stone structures that may have been used to store meat. None of the house or tent remains has been excavated. Their dates are estimates based on comparisons with buildings elsewhere in Greenland, and no surviving dwelling can be securely linked to the eight people buried nearby around 1475 CE.

Qilakitsoq enters the written record in 1789, shortly after the Omenak colony was founded at present-day Uummannaq in 1763. Recorded under the name "Killekitok", it was described as having a good harbour but being seldom inhabited. In 1811, geologist Karl Ludwig Giesecke listed Qilakitsoq among three places on the north side of the Nuussuaq Peninsula inhabited during winter.

Permanent settlement may have ended after 1811, but oral tradition records a few people living at Qilakitsoq during the nineteenth century. Gulløv and Meldgaard suggested that competition from European hunters using nets to catch seals may have contributed to its abandonment. Exactly when the settlement ceased to be used remains uncertain.

== Discovery ==
On October 9, 1972, two hunters, Hans and Jokum Grønvold from Uummannaq, discovered a grave containing several mummies while they were out hunting for rock ptarmigans. They covered the graves up again, and immediately alerted the authorities. Even so, it was not until 1978 that the first scientific investigations of the gravesites took place and soon thereafter, the mummies were transferred to Copenhagen for further research. In the meantime, there was already evidence of lasting damage by careless visitors; Hans and Jokum Grønvold repaired the partially covered graves multiple times.

== Deposition ==
The eight people were buried in two stone-built graves, which occupied a rocky ledge about 200 metres (660 ft) from the settlement and 27 metres (89 ft) above sea level. Between a large boulder and the rock face, an overhang helped shelter the burials from rain and snow. The graves were about 1.7 metres (5 ft 7 in) apart, almost at right angles to one another, and each reached 1 metre (3 ft 3 in) deep.

In Grave I, three women lay beneath two boys. The women were wrapped in sealskins or caribou skin, with their legs bent and heads towards the northwest. Above them, the older boy's head rested on the thighs of the woman directly beneath him, while the baby lay nearby on skins. Flat stones lined the floor, with cassiope and crowberry plants scattered over them.

Grave II held three women with their heads towards the south. The uppermost woman lay on her left side, her knees drawn up and hands folded before her chest. An edge of her caribou-skin wrapping covered her face. At the bottom, another woman's feet were wedged beneath stones. Grass and cassiope covered parts of the floor.

All eight people wore animal-skin clothing. Additional skins lay between the bodies, and stones covered the graves. The bodies had not been pushed aside to make room for later burials, but archaeologists could not establish whether everyone had been buried together or at different times.

The Greenland National Museum explains the clothing and extra skins as preparations for the journey to the realm of the dead, following Inuit burial customs. These belongings were intended to ensure a safe journey and a good life after death. Amulets found on and between the clothing were used to give strength and protect against evil spirits.

== Human remains ==
The numbering of the mummies follows the classifications of the initial investigators: specifically, the corpses were divided by graves and numbered from top to bottom.

=== Grave I ===
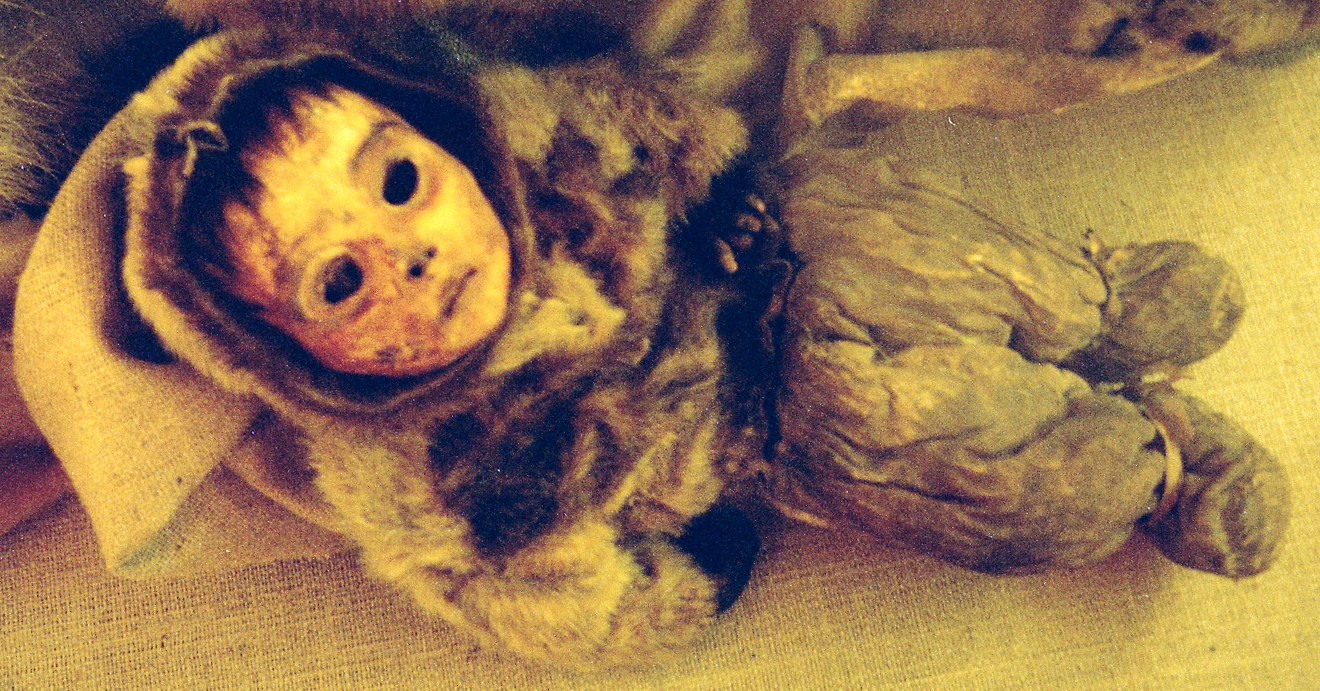
Mummy I/1: a six-month-old boy

==== I/1 A boy about six months ====
This best-preserved mummy was initially thought by its discoverers to be a doll. The especially good conservation can probably be attributed to a faster loss of body heat due to its smaller size. He likely descended from I/4 or II/7.

==== I/2 A four-year-old boy ====
This boy was probably the son of I/3.

==== I/3 A 20- to 30-year-old woman ====
This mummy is most likely the daughter of II/6 or II/8 and not, as initially assumed, the sister of I/4. This woman is also exhibited in the Nuuk museum.

==== I/4 A woman over 30 years ====
This mummy is also well-preserved and can be viewed in Nuuk. She might be the sister of II/7.

==== I/5 A woman of about 50 years ====
According to the results of a DNA analysis, this woman is not maternally related to any of the other mummies.

=== Grave II ===
==== II/6 A woman of about 50 years ====
This well-preserved mummy, which can be viewed in the museum, is likely the sister of II/8.

==== II/7 A woman of about 20 years ====
This woman could have been the sister of I/4. Food remains were found in her intestines, providing insight into her diet. As expected, there was a low proportion of plant-based nutrition; surprisingly, in addition to pollen, the remains of partially-burned non-native evergreen bark was found.

==== II/8 A woman of about 50 years ====
This mummy is very poorly preserved. She could be the sister of II/6.

== Clothing and associated items ==
As early as 1903, Qilakitsoq proved to be a prominent site of archaeological findings when the colonial administrator at the time sent several discovered artifacts to the National Museum of Denmark. Among other items were household objects and hunting tools, most of which are from the region's early history.

A total of 78 articles of clothing were discovered. Of note were the kamit, nearly waterproof boots stitched from sealskin, which were insulated from the cold using hay. Socks were generally worn under kamit. The mummies generally wore two layers of clothing: outer and inner (mostly short) trousers, and both an outer and an inner anorak. Mummy II/8 even wore three. The inner anoraks were largely made of feathers; five different species of bird were used to make one anorak. Outer layers were sealskin. The use of different colors and their arrangement suggest conscious design for aesthetic purposes.

== Scientific analysis ==
Due to certain clues such as age and location, the mummies were assumed to be two non-related families. As a result of mitochondrial DNA analyses, it was found that there were familial links between people in both graves. Radiocarbon dating yielded a probable time of death around 1475 with a margin of error of about ±50 years. Investigations were performed as carefully as possible; the four best-preserved mummies were neither derobed nor opened. Intense conservation measures were also avoided.

=== Health and injuries ===
Medical examinations revealed evidence of illness, injury and wear from everyday activities among the eight people buried at Qilakitsoq. Some diagnoses remain uncertain because researchers could examine the four best-preserved bodies only through X-rays and other methods that did not require opening them.

Two older women showed joint wear associated with osteoarthritis and compression fractures, where bones in the spine had collapsed. Another woman had a left collarbone fracture that had failed to join properly. Extensive damage at the base of her skull was interpreted as probable cancer of the upper throat, behind the nose. A younger woman had a possible kidney stone in her right kidney.

The boy aged about four had skeletal changes that researchers interpreted as possible Down syndrome. His left hip also showed signs of probable Legg–Calvé–Perthes disease, which affects the growing head of the thigh bone. Both diagnoses were based on examination of the surviving remains.

Dental examinations found no tooth decay, but chipped enamel was widespread and one tooth had a fractured root. The older women's teeth were heavily worn. Grooves across some teeth were attributed to preparing animal sinews for sewing. Researchers suggested that this work, together with using the teeth to prepare hides, helped explain teeth lost during life. Adults had substantial deposits of hardened plaque, although loss of the bone supporting their teeth was generally slight.

The lungs of a young woman contained extensive deposits of carbon particles, a condition called anthracosis. Skin examinations identified two small growths consistent with common warts on one woman's finger. The fingernails of two women also bore marks attributed to work.

== Tattoos ==
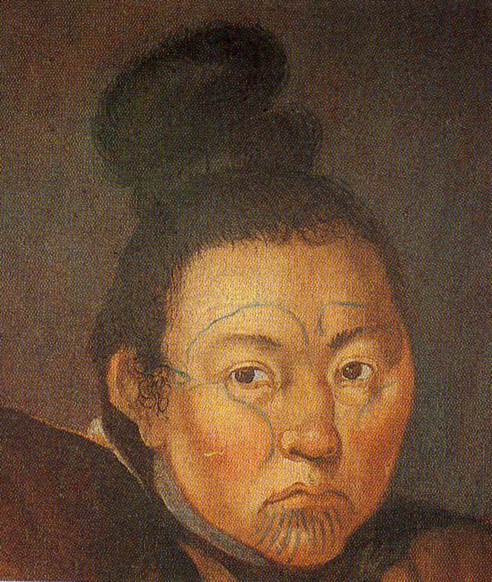
Married Greenlandic woman (1654). Her tattoos almost exactly match those of adult mummies found in Qilakitsoq.

Five of the six women buried at Qilakitsoq had facial tattoos. Infrared photography, which made markings beneath the darkened, dried skin easier to see, revealed details difficult to distinguish in ordinary light. No tattoos were found on the two children or the youngest woman, II/7, whose estimated age was 18–20 years.

All five tattooed women had forehead lines running above the eyebrows and dipping towards the bridge of the nose. Four had diagonal cheek lines ending in Y-shaped forks, and three had vertical chin lines. The skin on II/8's chin had not survived, preventing assessment of that area.

The designs differed in their details. I/3 had a distinct forehead dot and lines beside the outer eye corners. II/6 had broken lines, small T-shaped additions above the eyebrows and dots beside the cheek lines. No tattoos were found elsewhere on the bodies, although clothing covered some areas and others were examined only before cleaning.

Researchers identified two tattooing methods: puncturing the skin and drawing a needle threaded with soot-coated sinew beneath it. The tattoos provided the first certain evidence of puncture tattooing in Greenland. In his 2015 review, Niels Lynnerup, a biological anthropologist at the University of Copenhagen, described interpretations linking the custom to group and family relationships and to puberty and marriage. He suggested that the youngest woman's lack of tattoos might indicate that she had not yet married.

== Exhibition ==
The Qilakitsoq find was returned from Denmark to Greenland in 1982. Four of the eight mummies, together with material recovered from the graves, were placed in a permanent exhibition in specially designed rooms at the Greenland National Museum in Nuuk.

The museum's Qilakitsormiut exhibition displays the preserved clothing found with the burials, while the four mummies occupy a separate room. The museum presents the individuals through accounts of life, death, belief and society in the Greenland of their time. The exhibition discusses their burial clothing, the extra skins and garments supplied for the journey to the realm of the dead, facial tattoos and protective amulets found among the clothing.

== See also ==
- Dorset culture
- Saqqaq culture

== Literature ==
- Jens Peder Hart Hansen, Jørgen Meldgaard, Jørgen Nordqvist (eds.): The Greenland Mummies. British Museum Publications, London 1991, ISBN 0-7141-2500-8
- Jens Peder Hart Hansen, Jørgen Meldgaard, Jørgen Nordqvist: The Mummies of Qilakitsoq. In: National Geographic Society (eds.): National Geographic Magazine. Volume 167, No. 2. National Geographic Society, February 1985, ISSN 0027-9358.
