= Bodil Kaalund =

Danish textile artist and illustrator

Bodil Marie Kaalund-Jørgensen
- Born: November 8, 1930; Silkeborg
- Died: December 22, 2016 (aged 86); Lyngby
- Notable work: Korsnedtagelsen (Descent from the Cross) in 1966
- Parents: Martin Kaalund-Jørgensen (father); Hilda Jenny Rasmussen (mother)

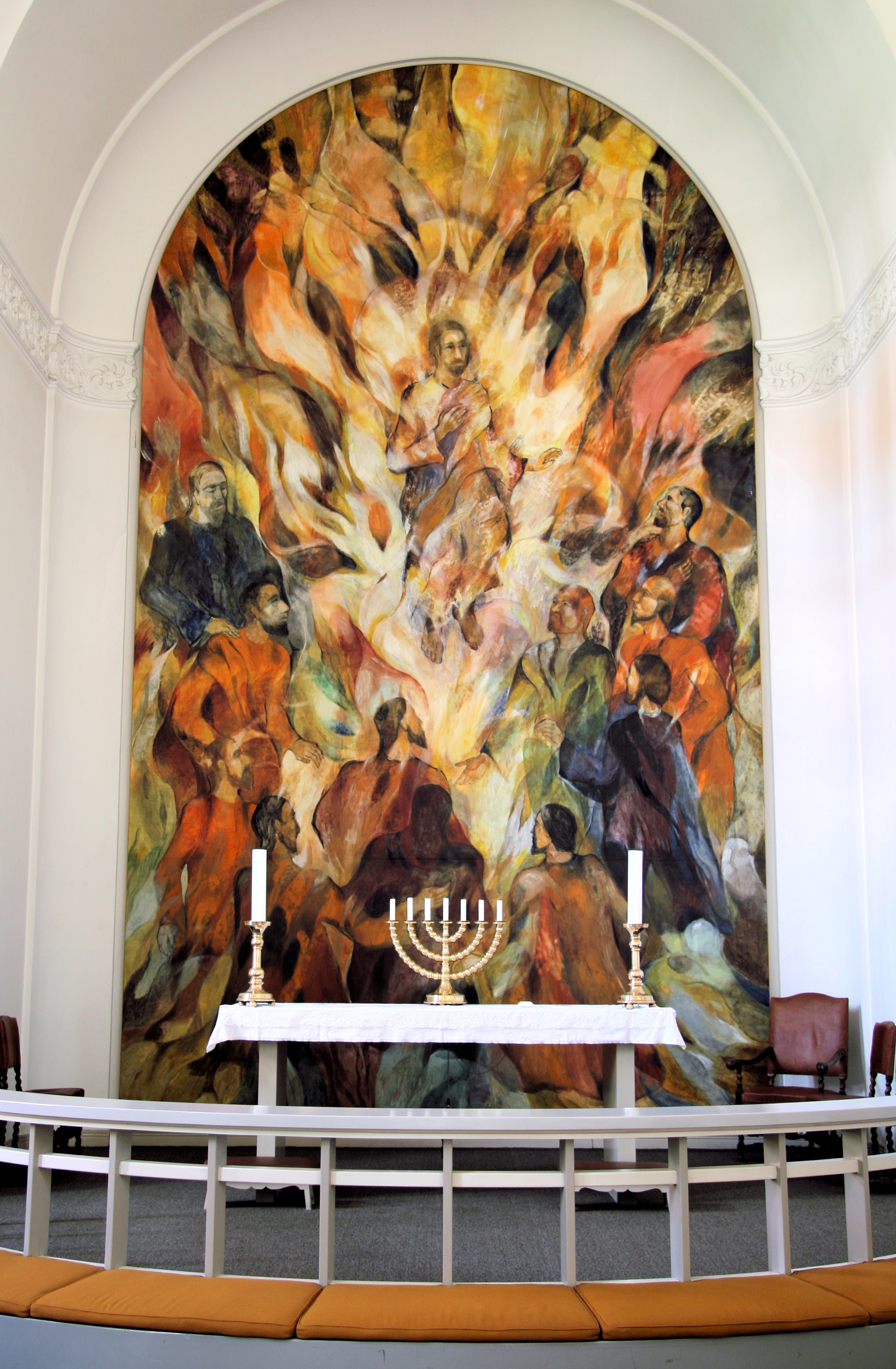
Bodil Kaalund: Altar painting in Solbjerg Church

Bodil Marie Kaalund-Jørgensen (1930–2016) was an award-winning Danish painter, textile artist and writer, who is remembered above all for her artwork in Danish churches and for her Bible illustrations. She was also a major contributor to the recognition of Greenland's cultural heritage, thanks in part to her Grønlands Kunst, published in English in 1983 as The Art of Greenland.

== Early life and education ==
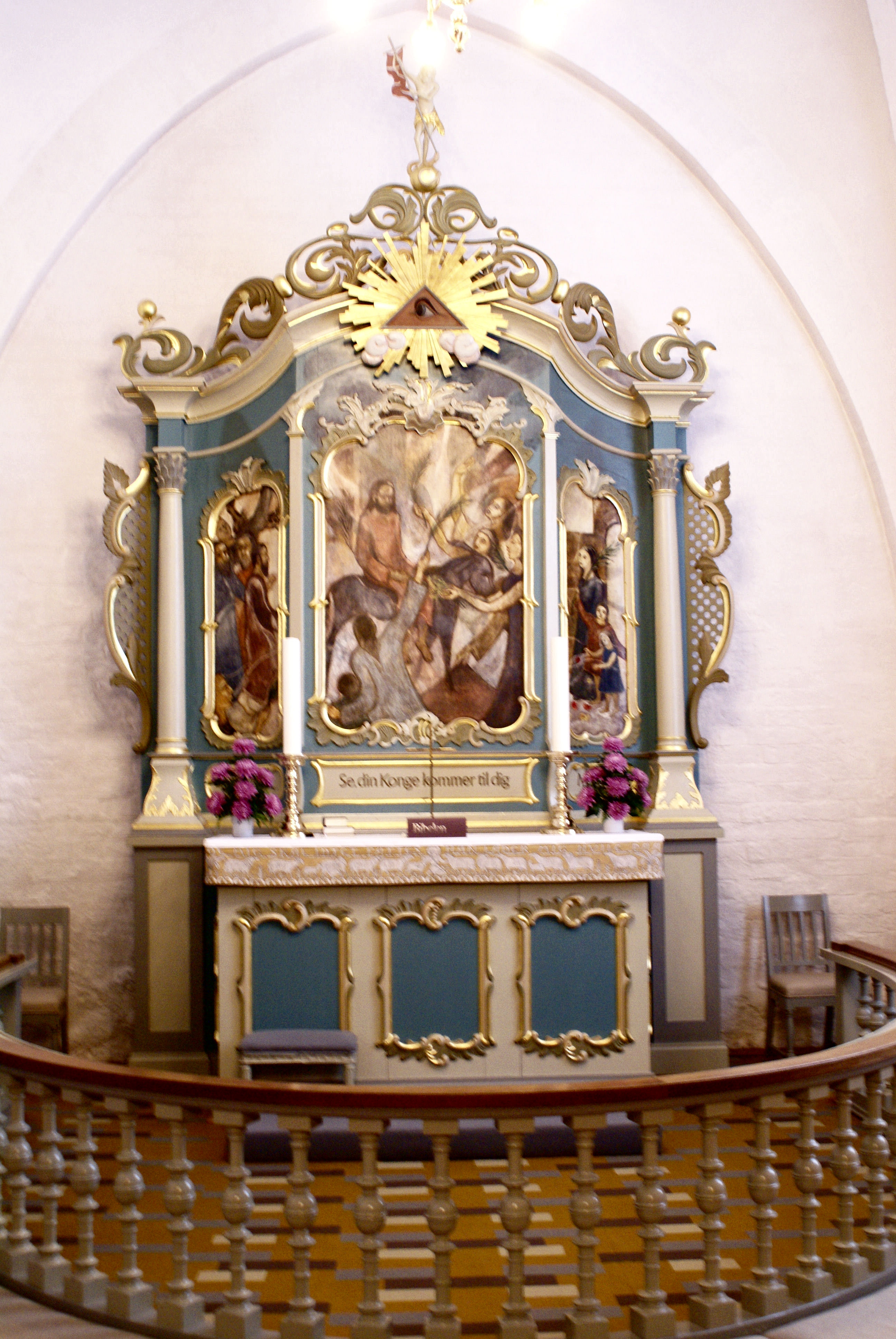
Bodil Kaalung: Altar in Lemvig Church

Born in Silkeborg on 8 November 1930, Bodil Marie Kaalund was the daughter of the painter Martin Kaalund-Jørgensen (1889–1952) and Hilda Jenny Rasmussen (1896–1984), a teacher. It was thanks to her father that she became interested in painting from an early age. Her mother, who never worked professionally, became her teacher when she and her elder sister spent their long summers in their Røsnæs summerhouse. In 1943, the family moved to Lyngby where she lived for the rest of her life.

Kaalund attended the state school in Lyngby. In her early teens, she became interested in religious art. This was reinforced in 1946 when she discovered the work of Edvard Munch while on holiday in Norway. When she was just 18, she exhibited two landscape paintings at Den Frie Udstilling's autumn exhibition.

After matriculating from high school, she studied at the Royal Danish Academy of Fine Arts under Kræsten Iversen, Holger J. Jensen and Elof Risebye, graduating in 1954. In 1950, Kaalund married the painter Nikolaj Nielsen. They had one child together, Magnus, but the marriage was dissolved in 1976.

== Career ==
While at the Royal Academy, Kaalund met the Greenlandic artist and writer Jens Rosing. As a result, she developed a keen interest in the art and culture of Greenland. In 1968, she travelled there to arrange the first exhibition of Danish art ever held in Greenland. The following year, she went on to arrange an exhibition of Greenlandic art in Denmark in the Louisiana Museum of Modern Art. She later collaborated with Hans Lynge to establish Grønlands Kunstskole (Greenland's Art School), which opened in 1972. In 1979, she published Grønlands kunst (translated as The Art of Greenland), the first extensive work of its kind.

Kaalund became recognized for her artwork with her painting Korsnedtagelsen (Descent from the Cross) in 1966. She became one of the first female artists to decorate churches when in 1972 she decorated the altar wall of Erlev Church on the island of Mors with a picture of Christ in the Garden of Gethsemane. In 1977, she decorated Lemvig Church in the west of Jutland, establishing a lasting relationship with the locality. She was instrumental in establishing the town's Museet for Religiøs Kunst (Museum for Religious Art) in 1994. She decorated a total of 27 churches, including Solbjerg Church and Hvidovre's Strandmark Church.

She also illustrated several religious works with Biblical scenes. Her major work in this connected was the new authorized Danish edition of the Bible which was published in 1992. It contained 159 illustrations. The original watercolours can be seen in the Lemvig Museum of Religious Art. Many of them are based on scenes from the countryside around the Limfjord and the west coast of Denmark.

Bodil Kaalund died in her sleep at her home in Lyngby on 22 December 2016.

== Awards ==
Kaalund had received many awards, including the Greenlandic Cultural Prize (2000) and the Academy's N. L. Høyen Medal (2002).
