= Katuaq =

Cultural centre in Nuuk, Greenland

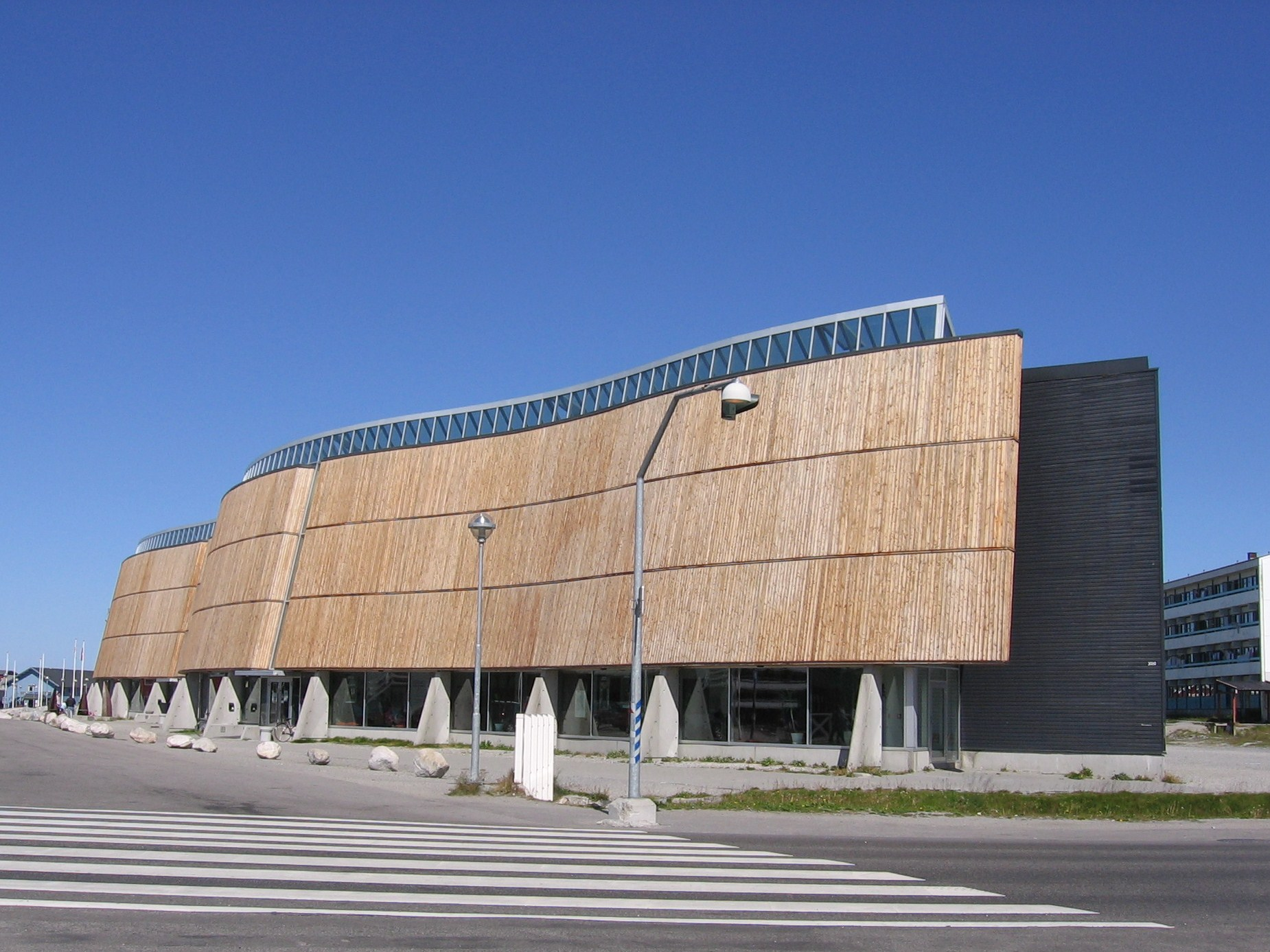
- The undulating perimeter screen
- Interactive map of the Katuaq area
- Alternative names: Grønlands Kulturhus

General information
- Architectural style: Modernism
- Location: Imaneq 21 3900 Nuuk, Nuuk, Greenland
- Coordinates: 64°10′38″N 51°44′20″W
- Construction started: 1994
- Completed: 1997
- Inaugurated: February 15, 1997
- Client: Nuuk Municipality

Technical details
- Floor area: 4800 square metres

Design and construction
- Architect: Schmidt Hammer Lassen

Katuaq (Danish: Grønlands Kulturhus) is a cultural centre in Nuuk, Greenland. It is used for concerts, exhibitions, conferences, and as a cinema. Designed by Schmidt Hammer Lassen, it was constructed as a joint project of the Greenland Home Rule Government, the Nuuk Municipal Council and the Nordic Council of Ministers and was inaugurated on 15 February 1997.

== Building ==
Katuaq is an L-shaped building with an undulating, backward-leaning screen facing onto Nuuk's central urban space. It is raised above the ground and clad in golden larch wood on both the inside and outside. The screen is inspired by the northern lights. This second skin also creates a contrast to the building proper. Between the perimeter screen and the core building lies the large foyer with three white freestanding elements in the shapes of a triangle, square, and circle.

== Facilities ==
Katuaq contains two auditoria, the larger one seating 508 people and the smaller one 80. The big auditorium, The Hans Lynge Hall, is used for concerts, theatre, conferences, and as a cinema. Katuaq also provides meeting facilities, administrative offices and a café.

Offices:

- NAPA - The Nordic Institute in Greenland
- Hello Norden, the Nordic Council of Ministers information service

Nuuk Center, the country's first shopping mall, is located right next door.

== See also ==
- List of Greenlandic artists
- Taseralik Culture Center
