= Barry Lopez =

American writer (1945–2020)

- Born: January 6, 1945; Port Chester, New York, U.S.
- Died: December 25, 2020 (aged 75); Eugene, Oregon, U.S.
- Education: University of Notre Dame (BA, MA)
- Writing career
- Notable works: Of Wolves and Men (1978); Arctic Dreams (1986)

Barry Holstun Lopez (January 6, 1945 – December 25, 2020) was an American essayist, nature writer, and fiction writer whose work is known for its humanitarian and environmental concerns. In a career spanning over 50 years, he visited more than 80 countries, and wrote extensively about a variety of landscapes including the Arctic wilderness, exploring the relationship between human cultures and nature. He won the National Book Award for Nonfiction for Arctic Dreams (1986) and his Of Wolves and Men (1978) was a National Book Award finalist. He was a contributor to magazines including Harper's Magazine, National Geographic, and The Paris Review.

== Early life ==
Lopez was born Barry Holstun Brennan on January 6, 1945, in Port Chester, New York, to Mary Frances (née Holstun) and John Brennan. His family moved to Reseda, California after the birth of his brother, Dennis, in 1948. He attended grade school at Our Lady of Grace during this time. His parents divorced in 1950, after which his mother married Adrian Bernard Lopez, a businessman, in 1955. Adrian Lopez adopted Barry and his brother, and they both took his surname. Barry Lopez experienced years of sexual abuse as the victim of a serial child molester posing as a doctor who went by the name Harry Shier.

When Lopez was 11, his family relocated to Manhattan, where he attended the Loyola School, graduating in 1962. As a young man, Lopez considered becoming a Catholic priest or a Trappist monk before attending the University of Notre Dame, earning undergraduate and graduate degrees there in 1966 and 1968. He also attended New York University and the University of Oregon. Although he drifted away from Catholicism, daily prayer remained important to him as a continuous, respectful attendance to the presence of the Divine.

== Career and works ==
Lopez's essays, short stories, reviews and opinion pieces began to appear in 1966. In his career of over 50 years, he traveled to over 80 countries, writing extensively about distant and exotic landscapes including the Arctic wilderness, exploring the relationships between human cultures and wild nature. Through his works, he also highlighted the harm caused by human actions on nature. He was a contributing editor of Harper's Magazine and a contributor to many magazines including National Geographic, The Paris Review, and Outside. Until 1981, he was also a landscape photographer. In 2002, he was elected a fellow of The Explorers Club.

Arctic Dreams (1986) describes five years in the Canadian Arctic, where Lopez worked as a biologist. Robert Macfarlane, reviewing the book in The Guardian, describes him as "the most important living writer about wilderness". In The New York Times, Michiko Kakutani argued that Arctic Dreams "is a book about the Arctic North in the way that Moby-Dick is a novel about whales".

A number of Lopez's works, including Giving Birth to Thunder, Sleeping with His Daughter (1978), make use of Native American legends, including characters such as Coyote. Crow and Weasel (1990) thematizes the importance of metaphor, which Lopez described in an interview as one of the definitive "passion[s]" of humanity.

James I. McClintock describes Lopez as an admirer of Wendell Berry. McClintock further observes, referring to Arctic Dreams, that Lopez "conjoin[s] ecological science and romantic insight". Slovic identifies "careful structure, euphony, and an abundance of particular details" as central characteristics of Lopez's work.

His final work published during his lifetime was Horizon (2019), an autobiographical telling of his travels over his lifetime. The Guardian describes the book as "a contemporary epic, at once pained and urgent, personal and oracular". A collection of essays, some of which had previously been published and others of which were new to the public, was published posthumously by Penguin Random House under the title Embrace Fearlessly the Burning World (2022), with an introduction by Rebecca Solnit.

An archive of Lopez's manuscripts and other work has been established at Texas Tech University, where he was the university's Visiting Distinguished Scholar. He also taught at universities including Columbia University, Eastern Washington University, University of Iowa, and Carleton College, Minnesota.

== Bibliography ==
=== Fiction ===
- Desert Notes: Reflections in the Eye of a Raven. Sheed, Andrews & McMeel. 1976. ISBN 0-8362-0661-4. OCLC 2089496.
- Giving Birth to Thunder, Sleeping with His Daughter: Coyote Builds North America. Sheed Andrews and McMeel. 1977. ISBN 0-8362-0726-2. OCLC 3433348.
- River Notes: The Dance of Herons. Andrews and McMeel. 1979. ISBN 0-8362-6106-2. OCLC 5170658.
- Winter Count. Scribner. 1981. ISBN 0-684-16817-0. OCLC 7178782. Distinguished Recognition Award, Friends of American Writers
- Crow and Weasel. North Point Press. 1990. ISBN 0-86547-439-7. OCLC 21118849. Parents' Choice Award
- Field Notes: The Grace Note of the Canyon Wren. Alfred A. Knopf. 1994. ISBN 0-679-43453-4. OCLC 29754729. Pacific Northwest Booksellers Association Award, Critics' Choice Award
- Lessons from the Wolverine. University of Georgia Press. 1997. ISBN 0-8203-1927-9. OCLC 36165237.
- Light Action in the Caribbean: Stories. Random House. 2000. ISBN 0-679-31076-2. OCLC 43929944.
- Resistance. Alfred A. Knopf. 2004. ISBN 1-4000-4220-8. OCLC 53477173.
- Outside: Six Short Stories. Trinity University Press. 2014. ISBN 978-1-59534-189-1. OCLC 855580539.

=== Nonfiction ===
- Of Wolves and Men. Scribner. 1978. ISBN 0-684-15624-5. OCLC 3843350. National Book Award finalist, John Burroughs Medal, Christopher Medal, Pacific Northwest Booksellers Association Award
- Arctic Dreams: Imagination and Desire in a Northern Landscape. Scribner. 1986. ISBN 978-0-375-72748-1. OCLC 48071476. National Book Award, National Book Critics Circle Award finalist
- Crossing Open Ground. Vintage Books. 1989. ISBN 0-679-72183-5. OCLC 18987292.
- The Rediscovery of North America. Vintage Books. 1992. ISBN 0-679-74099-6. OCLC 25788222.
- About This Life: Journeys on the Threshold of Memory. Random House. 1998. ISBN 0-679-30944-6. OCLC 38757150.
- Apologia. University of Georgia Press. 1998. ISBN 0-8203-2004-8. OCLC 37820073.
- Richard K. Nelson; Barry Holstun Lopez; Terry Tempest Williams (2002). Patriotism and the American Land: Essays. Orion Society. ISBN 9780913098615.
- Horizon. Penguin Random House. 2019. ISBN 978-0-307-35599-7. OCLC 1077254235.
- Embrace Fearlessly the Burning World. Random House. 2022. ISBN 978-0593242827. Introduction by Rebecca Solnit.

=== Anthology ===
- Vintage Lopez. Vintage Books. 2004. ISBN 1-4000-3398-5. OCLC 52410107.

=== Edited volumes ===
- Home Ground: Language for an American Landscape. Trinity University Press. 2006. ISBN 1-59534-024-6. OCLC 70167626.
- The Future of Nature: Writing on a Human Ecology from Orion Magazine. Milkweed Editions. 2007. ISBN 978-1-57131-306-5. OCLC 141187889.

== Awards and honors ==
- National Book Award
- Award in Literature, American Academy of Arts and Letters
- Lannan Literary Award
- Guggenheim Fellowship
- John Burroughs Medal
- Two Pushcart Prizes
- National Science Foundation Fellowship
- MacDowell Colony Residency Fellowship
- Academy of Television Arts and Sciences Award
- Elected Fellow of the Explorers Club
- Doctor of Humane Letters from Whittier College

== Personal life ==
Lopez's first marriage to Sandra Landers in 1967 ended in a divorce in 1998. He married Debra Gwartney in 2007. After the property surrounding their long-term home near Finn Rock on the McKenzie River in western Oregon was burned in the 2020 Holiday Farm Fire, the couple moved temporarily to Eugene, Oregon.

Lopez died on December 25, 2020, from complications of prostate cancer, in Eugene, Oregon.

== Sources ==
- McClintock, James I. (1994). Nature's Kindred Spirits: Aldo Leopold, Joseph Wood Krutch, Edward Abbey, Annie Dillard, and Gary Snyder. University of Wisconsin Press. ISBN 978-0-299-14173-8. OCLC 550516714.
- Slovic, Scott (1992). Seeking Awareness in American Nature Writing: Henry Thoreau, Annie Dillard, Edward Abbey, Wendell Berry, Barry Lopez. University of Utah Press. ISBN 0-585-10655-X. OCLC 43475967.
