= Mitsivarniannga =

Greenlandic shaman and tupilaq creator

Mitsivarniannga (1860 – 1910) was an angakkuq (a Greenlandic shaman) who created tupilai. He was among the first Greenlandic artists to produce tupilai, when between 1905 and 1906, he created a series of replicas for a Danish researcher made of driftwood and child body parts, including teeth, eyes, and skin. His son was Kârale Andreassen, who drew one of his tupilai, which was created in response to the death of Mitsivarniannga's brother.

== Life and career ==
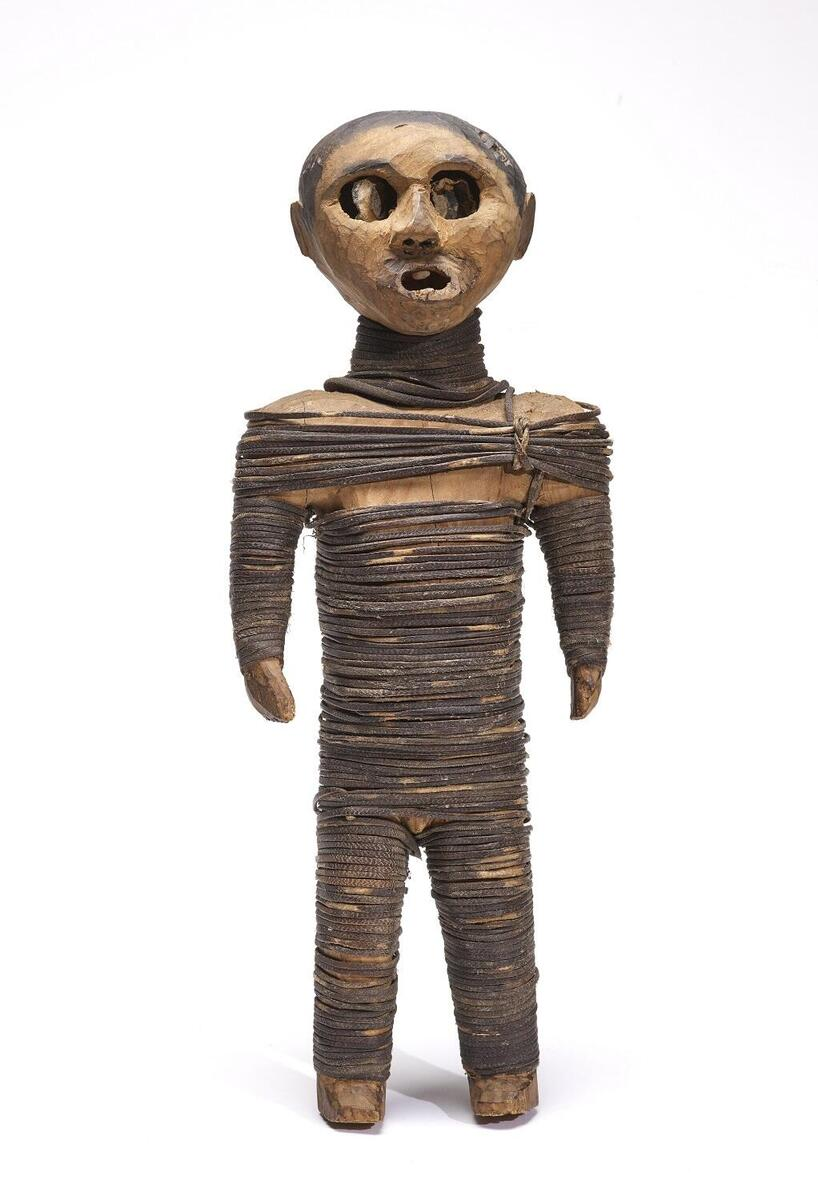
A tupilaq created by Mitsivarniannga for Thalbitzer

Mitsivarniannga was born in 1860.

Tupilai were figures which caused misfortune. During the Danish conquest of Greenland, settlers attempted—but never succeeded—in furnishing authentic tupilai; artists began to create replicas, which they would then sell. Between 1905 and 1906, Mitsivarniannga created one of the first tupilaq replicas for a Danish researcher, William Thalbitzer, which depicted a tupilaq that harassed Mitsivarniannga's family; these were made of child body parts (including teeth, eyes, and skin) and driftwood. This broke the taboo of not showing settlers tupilai, and other artists began to create tupilaq figures.

The settlers and missionaries allowed for East Greenlandic cultural traditions to continue on, and as a result of this sympathetic approach, Mitsivarniannga was among the first shamans to convert to Christianity.

Mitsivarniannga's son was Kârale Andreassen, a catechist. In the 1920s, Andreassen drew one of his father's tupilai, which was created in response to the death of Mitsivarniannga's brother. According to Mitsivarniannga, the tupilaq was created with pieces of his brother's body (including his head), a dead snow bunting, and seal tendons. After assembling the tupilaq, he said it came alive and flew away to avenge the death of his brother.

Mitsivarniannga died in 1910. A book of Greenlandic songs has one about challenging him from 1935.
