= Arctic Dreams =

1986 nonfiction book by Barry Lopez

Arctic Dreams: Imagination and Desire in a Northern Landscape
- Author: Barry Lopez
- Language: English
- Set in: Alaskan and Canadian Arctic
- Publisher: Charles Scribner's Sons
- Publication date: 1986
- Awards: National Book Award for Nonfiction (1986)
- ISBN: 9780684185781

Arctic Dreams: Imagination and Desire in a Northern Landscape is a 1986 nonfiction book by Barry Lopez. It won the National Book Award for Nonfiction, the Christopher Medal, a Pacific Northwest Booksellers Association Award, and an Oregon Book Award for literary nonfiction. It was a National Book Critics Circle Award finalist. The book is about the Arctic landscape, its wildlife, and the relationship between human beings and the natural world.

== Contents ==
Arctic Dreams (1986) describes five years in the Alaskan and Canadian Arctic, where Lopez worked as a biologist.

Lopez approaches the Arctic not as a comforting wilderness but as a demanding teacher. Its extreme light, immense spaces, and unusual landscapes challenge ordinary human perceptions. The phenomenon of the Arctic white-out, for example, eliminates shadows, depth, and horizons, forcing people to reconsider their assumptions about space and orientation. For Lopez, such experiences expose the limitations and complacency of human ways of thinking about nature.

Before writing Arctic Dreams, Lopez spent five years working as a field biologist in the Canadian Arctic. His scientific experience gave him an intimate knowledge of the region, from Melville Island and the Hood River to Baffin Bay and the Beaufort Sea. His writing combines scientific observation with literary sensitivity.

In Arctic Dreams, Barry Lopez spent time living among the Eskimos, learning about their language, culture, and relationship with the Arctic environment. He challenges the idea that Western culture is more sophisticated, arguing that Indigenous knowledge is essential to understanding and surviving in the Arctic. The concept of “Isumataq” expresses the importance of community: no individual can possess all knowledge, so people must share information, respect different opinions, and combine their experience. Lopez presents this collective knowledge as closely connected to respect for nature. The book also describes the mistreatment of Inuit people by explorers such as Robert Peary, revealing a darker history of Arctic exploration and its consequences for Indigenous communities.

== Structure ==
Arctic Dreams is structured as a series of interconnected essays that explore the Arctic through its landscapes, animals, peoples, history, and natural phenomena. Lopez moves between scientific observation, personal experience, and cultural reflection, creating a work that is neither simply a travel book nor a scientific study. He examines polar bears, whales, ice, mirages, birds, and the lives of Arctic communities, showing how each element forms part of a larger ecological system. A central concern of the book is the difficulty of truly knowing a landscape. Lopez suggests that the Arctic cannot be reduced to measurements, maps, or scientific descriptions alone. Its meaning emerges through the relationships between living creatures, physical environments, memory, and human perception.

== Reception ==
Robert Macfarlane, reviewing the book in The Guardian, describes him as "the most important living writer about wilderness". In The New York Times, Michiko Kakutani argued that Arctic Dreams "is a book about the Arctic North in the way that Moby-Dick is a novel about whales".
