= Pia Arke =

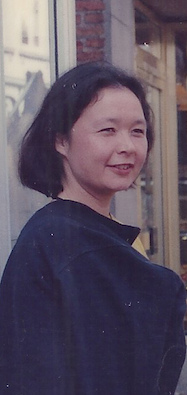
- Born: September 1, 1958; Ittoqqortoormiit, Greenland
- Died: May 2007 (aged 48)

Pia Arke (née Gant; 1 September 1958 – May 2007) was a Kalaaleq (Greenlandic Inuk) and Danish visual and performance artist, writer and photographer. She is remembered and respected for her self-portraits and landscape photographs of Kalaallit Nunaat (Greenland), as well as for her paintings, writings which strove to make visible the colonial histories and complex ethnic and cultural relations between Denmark and Greenland. Throughout her artistic-research practice, Arke used the metaphor of her own mixed-heritage (the "mongrel") as an opportunity to engage these historical relationships, as well as address significant questions of Arctic Indigenous identity and representation.

== Early life ==
Arke was born on September 1, 1958 in Ittoqqortoormiit in northeastern Greenland to a Danish father (the telegraphist Jørgen Gant) and a Greenlandic mother (Justine Piparajik Birgitte). She was brought up in the Thule area of northern Greenland and in the southern town of Narsaq, however, like numerous children of similar parentage, she never learnt to speak Greenlandic. She lived with her family both in the east and west of Greenland. After initial schooling in Danish-language schools in Greenland, she moved with her family to Denmark when she was 13 years old.

In 1987, Arke returned to Copenhagen, Denmark where she attended the Royal Danish Academy of Fine Arts in Copenhagen to study painting under Mogens Møller and Per Bak Jensen, graduating in 1993. That very same year, Arke entered the Department of Theory and Communications at the Royal Danish Academy of Fine Arts, Copenhagen. She graduated with an MFA in 1995 with a published thesis "Ethno-Aesthetics/Etnoæstetik", critiquing Western romantic and primitivist stereotyping of "Eskimo" art, foregrounding critical issues of cultural identity and authenticity in art.

== Career ==
In the late 1980s, Arke began to exhibit her paintings. In 1988, Arke developed her own life-size pin-hole camera (camera obscura) which she hand-built using pine and plywood, to photograph the landscapes of Greenland that she had known as a child. The final results were displayed in her exhibition Imaginary Homelands in 1990. The structure had a little entry-way where the artist would climb in and attach a sheet of film along the back wall. Light from the outside would then stream in through a little hole at the opposite end of the enclosure. The artist would often take advantage of the slow exposure process, (fifteen to thirty minutes) by staying in the box to manipulate the process through the use of her own body which would cast a visible shadow on the finished image.

In his Editors' introduction to Pia Arke. Arctic Hysteria 1997, Iben Mondrup portrays how her exhibition was provocatively called "Arctic hysteria", given the controversial irrationality that was said to affect Indigenous women. Her exhibitions and accompanying explanations encouraged Denmark to re-examine the colonial history of Greenland. While a number of exhibitions were held throughout her lifetime, the first important exhibition of her work in Denmark did not take place until after her death with Tupilakosaurus (2010).Tupilakosaurus consists of over 70 photographs, paintings, videos, installations and reports.

Arke's art and photographs re-examine the history of Denmark's repressive colonization in Greenland. As an outcome, Pia is now recognized as one of the Nordic region's most important postcolonial critics and players as a result of the artistic research which she practiced for two decades.

== Legacy ==
In May 2007, Pia Arke died from cancer at 48 years of age. Her books have been re-issued and a film and exhibition were created in 2010 at the National Museum of Denmark. Her "Ethno-Aesthetics" (1995) and "Stories from Scoresbysund" (2003) were made available in English, Danish and Greenlandic. The exhibition was then moved to Sweden and Greenland.

== Exhibitions ==
- 2019 – 16th Istanbul Biennial: The Seventh Continent, curated by Nicolas Bourriaud, at Pera Museum, Istanbul, Turkey
- 2019 – Pia Arke: Wonderland, curated by Katrine Elise Pedersen, at Kunsthall Trondheim, Trondheim, Norway
- 2022 – Drøm og fortrængning, curated by Marianne Ager, at Brandts, Odense, Denmark

== Published works ==
- Arke, Pia (2010). Ethno-aesthetics (in Danish). Kunsttidsskriftet ARK, Pia Arke Selskabet & Kuratorisk Aktion. ISBN 978-87-993523-1-9.
- Arke, Pia (2010). Stories from Scoresbysund: Photographs, Colonisation and Mapping. Pia Arke Selskabet and Kuratorisk Auktion. ISBN 978-87-993523-0-2.
- Arke, Pia (2012). Tupilakosaurus: An Incomplete(Able) Survey of Pia Arke's Artistic Work and Research. ISBN 978-87-993523-3-3.
