= The Nordic Institute in Greenland =

Cultural institute

The Nordic Institute in Greenland (NAPA – Nunani Avannarlerni Piorsarsimassutsikkut Attaveqaat) is a Nordic cultural institute under the aegis of the Nordic Council of Ministers located in Nuuk. Established 1 January 1986, as an institution under Nordic Council of Ministers (NCM) within the framework of Nordic Cultural Cooperation. NAPA aims to provide people in Greenland with knowledge about the other Nordic countries’ languages and cultures. The Institute also aims to spread knowledge about the Greenlandic language and culture to the other Nordic countries. In collaboration with the other Nordic Houses and Institutes, NAPA also coordinates cultural co-operation with the neighbours in the North American countries and the Arctic.

The Institute organises cultural events, such as meetings with authors, exhibitions and lectures on Nordic issues, and has an extensive co-operation with other organisations and cultural institutions. NAPA also organises seminars and publishes material about the Nordic countries and their languages both on the Internet and as printed materials.

The Institute is involved in a number of outward-directed activities, especially in relation to schools and educational institutions in Greenland.

NAPA was founded in 1986. It is located in the centre of Nuuk at the cultural centre of Katuaq.
