= Inuk Silis Høegh =

Greenlandic artist and filmmaker

- Born: 1972 (age 53–54); Qaqortoq, Greenland, Kingdom of Denmark
- Citizenship: Kingdom of Denmark
- Education: MFA, The Royal Danish Academy of Fine Arts; MA, University of Bristol
- Occupations: Filmmaker, artist
- Parent(s): Aka Høegh, Ivars Silis

Inuk Silis Høegh (born 1972 in Qaqortoq, Greenland, Kingdom of Denmark) is a Greenlandic artist and filmmaker. The son of artist Aka Høegh and photographer and film artist Ivars Silis, he grew up in an artistic environment, and his sister is Bolatta Silis Høegh, also an artist.

== Background and education ==
Høegh received the Niels Wessel Bagges Grant in 2005, completing a Master of Fine Arts (MFA) from The Royal Danish Academy of Fine Arts (2010) and a Master of Arts in Film and TV Production from the University of Bristol (1997).

== Career ==
=== Filmmaking ===
Høegh's 2002 documentary "Eskimo Weekend" followed a Greenlandic rock band over a weekend, and has been credited with challenging stereotypes about Inuit. In 2014 Høegh released the documentary Sumé: Sound of a Revolution about the groundbreaking Greenlandic rock band Sumé. The movie was the first ever Greenlandic selection shown at the Berlinale festival, and was very well received.

He is partner with Emile Hertling Péronard in the Ánorâk Film documentary studio.

=== Visual art ===
In 2013 Høegh's art installation Iluliaq, a monumental sculpture of an iceberg, was installed in the Great Hall of the National Gallery of Canada, in Ottawa, as part of the exhibition Sakahàn: International Indigenous Art. The work provided a commentary on climate change, as it appeared gradually to "melt" as the windows of the Great Hall were replaced over the duration of the installation. His artwork has been featured in exhibitions in countries including Greenland, Denmark, France, Iceland, Finland, Latvia and Germany, and his film work has been shown internationally.

== Filmography ==
- Godnat - Sinilluarit (short film, 1999)
- På Fremmed Is (documentary, 2000)
- Eskimo Weekend (short film, 2001)
- Red Lights and Time for Time (music videos, 2003–2004)
- Sooq Akersuuttugut / Why We Fight (art video, 2004)
- Tarrarsornerit / Spejlinger (documentary, 2007)
- Sumé: The Sound of a Revolution (documentary, 2014)
- The Green Land
