= Nuuk Port and Harbour =

Nuuk Port
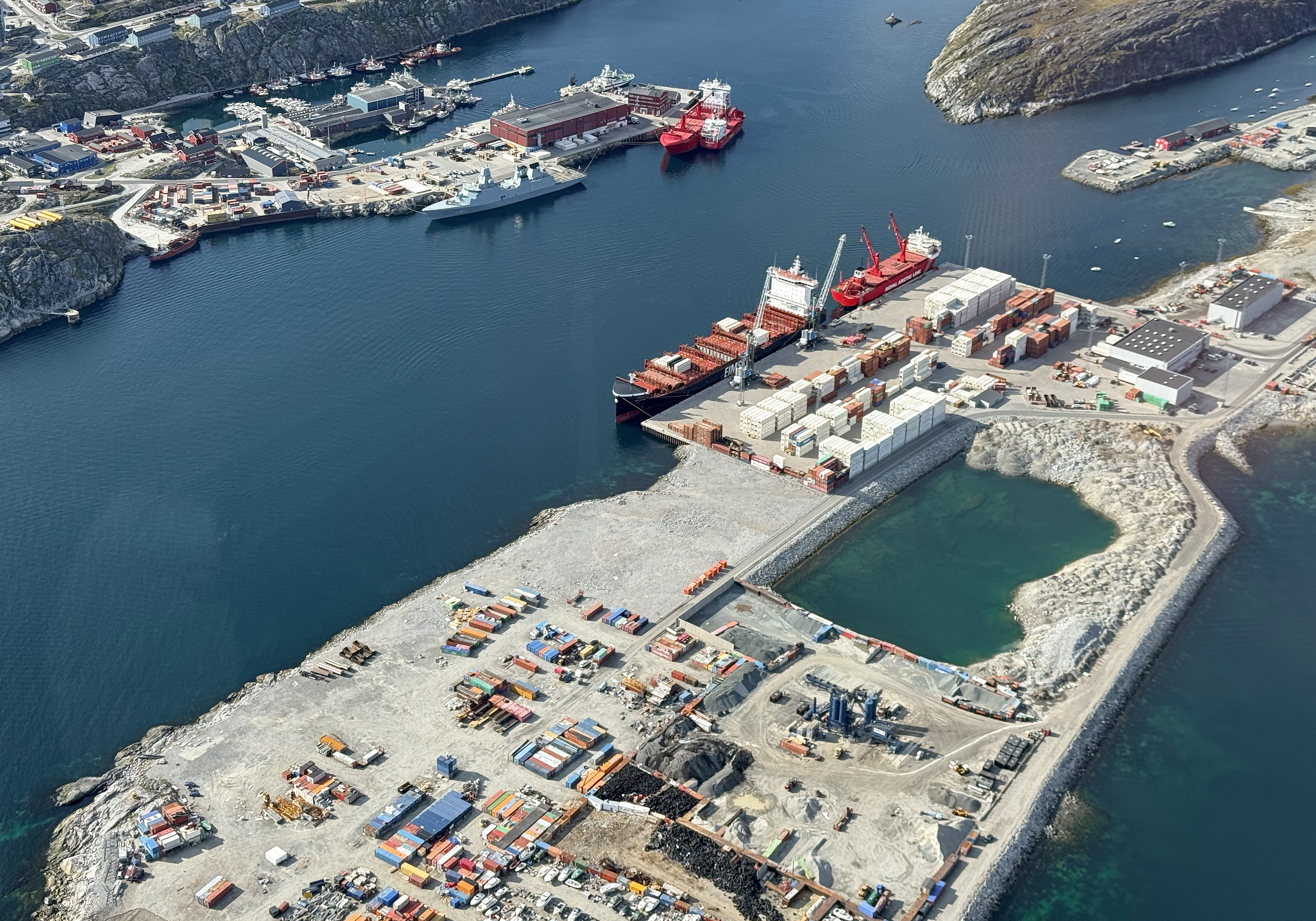
- Aerial view in 2025

Location
- Country: Greenland
- Location: Nuuk
- Coordinates: 64°10′15″N 51°43′15″W
- UN/LOCODE: GLGOH

Details
- Opened: 2017
- Operated by: Sikuki Nuuk Harbour A/S
- Owned by: Government of Greenland
- Type of harbour: Seaport
- No. of berths: 3
- Operator: Sikuki Nuuk Harbour A/S

Statistics
- Annual container volume: 60,000 TEU (2022)
- Website; Official website

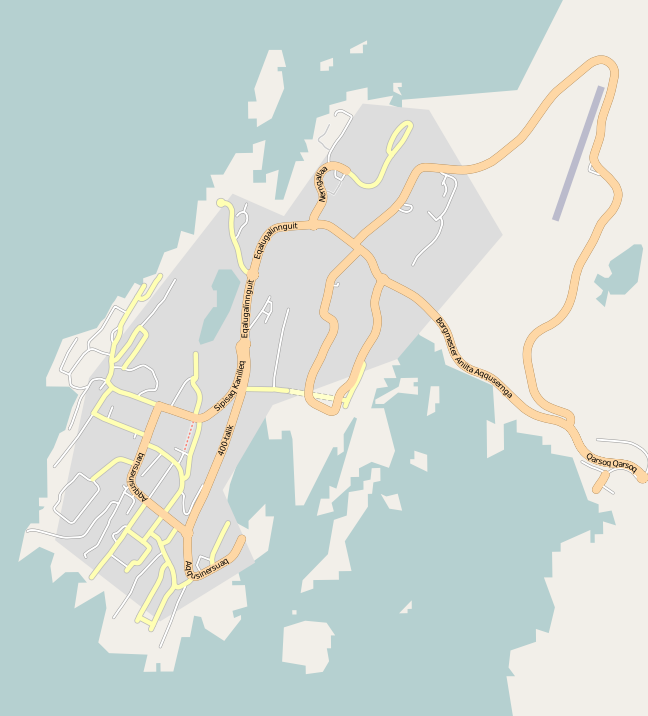
Map of Nuuk showing the harbour towards the southeast

Nuuk Port and Harbour is the largest port in Greenland. It is located in the southeastern area of the city of Nuuk known as Old Nuuk. The harbour entrance is restricted due to tides during much of the year, and ice during winter.

The inner port area is home to a marina for smaller vessels and ferries. And larger vessels to the east side of the port area.

Container area is located east of the ferry terminal with an area for container storage and processing. The container area was moved from the south side to the east in 2016.
