= Arnannguaq Høegh =

Greenlandic visual artist (1956–2020)

- Born: 1956; Qaqortoq
- Died: October 15, 2020 (aged 63–64)
- Occupations: artist; head of the Greenlandic Art Collage

Arnannguaq Høegh (1956– 15 October 2020) was a Greenlandic visual artist whose art was inspired by the country's symbols and nature. Remembered in particular for her graphic works, she was also active in sculpture and in abstract painting. From 1991, she ran the college of art (Kunstskolen) in Nuuk where she exerted significant influence over new generations of Greenlandic artists.

== Early life and education ==
Born in Qaqortoq in 1956, Arnannguaq Høegh attendeded the Folk High School for Art (Kunsthøjskolen) in Holbæk (1975), participated in the Kinngait workshop on Baffin Island (1976), studied at the Nova Scotia College of Art and Design (1977), at the Royal Danish Academy of Fine Arts (1978–79), at the Norwegian National Academy of Fine Arts (1979–81) and the Danish Academy's Pedagogical School (1982–86).

== Career ==
In 1980, Høegh exhibited her early prints and drawings at Greenland's Aasivik Innuit Festival, some of which had been created while she was at the Kinngait Workshop. Exhibiting sections containing elongated line drawings, the images reflect the influence of Kenojuak Ashevak and Pudlo Pudlat but they also demonstrate her own use of firm lines breaking the image into irregular abstract shapes.

Like that of other West Coast artists who studied under Bodil Kaalund, her tendencies towards social realism can be seen in her interest in details of objects depicting realism, although her later prints seem increasingly abstract. Thanks to her decorative texture, she was nevertheless able to emphasize common aspects of daily life which are frequently ignored. By the 1990s. Høegh was experimenting with techniques including photogravure and photopolymer to express notions of realism. This led later to her wider use of photographic references.

In 1991, Høegh was appointed head of the Greenlandic Art Collage in Nuuk where she trained generations of new artists while contributing to artwork herself. She also headed Kimik, Greenland's art association.

Arnannguaq Høegh died in Nuuk on 15 October 2020 after a lengthy illness.
