= Iben Mondrup =

Danish author (born 1969)

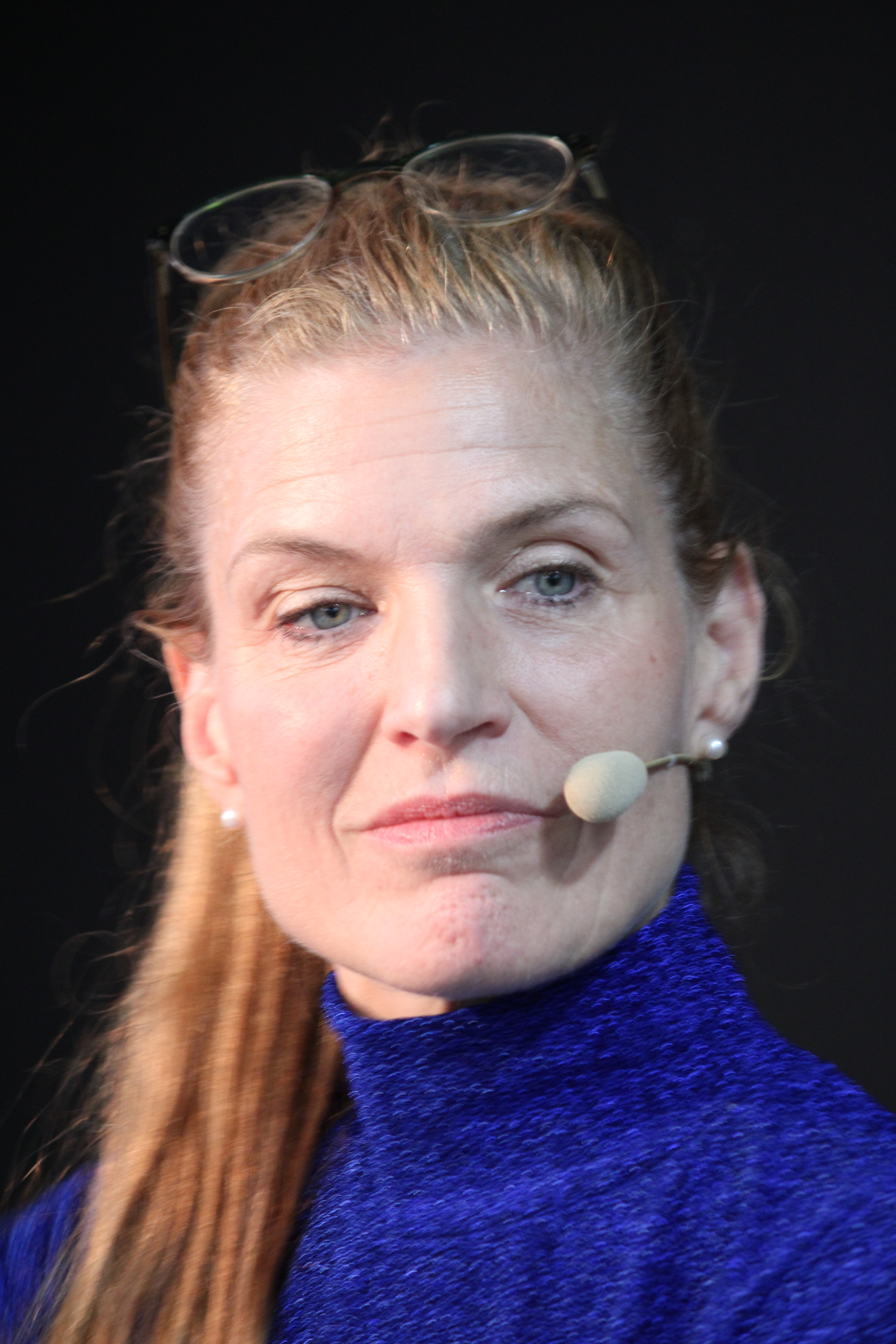
- Mondrup in 2025
- Born: September 26, 1969 (age 57); Copenhagen, Denmark
- Education: Royal Danish Academy of Fine Arts
- Children: 2

Iben Mondrup née Mortensen (born 1969) is a Danish novelist who spent her childhood in Greenland. A graduate of the Royal Danish Academy of Fine Arts, she turned to writing in 2009. publishing eight novels by 2023. Like many of her works which draw on her experience of life in Greenland and deal with family conflicts, Godhavn won the DR Romanprisen (Danmarks Radio's novel prize) in 2015. Her subsequent novels have also been best sellers. Mondrup has two children and lives in Copenhagen.

== Early life and family ==
Born in Copenhagen on 26 September 1969, Iben Mondrup is the daughter of the schoolteachers Ebbe and Kirsten Mortensen. She moved to Greenland with her parents in 1972. Initially she attended kindergarten with local Greenlandic children but then started school in a Danish-speaking class with just one other pupil, a boy from Denmark. Until she was 12, she lived in Qeqertarsuaq, but then the family moved to Nuuk, the capital. When she was 18, Mondrup moved to Copenhagen where she studied at the Royal Danish Academy of Fine Arts, graduating as a painter in 2003 with a master's degree in theory of art and communication.

== Career ==
In connection with her artistic interests, Mondrup has been involved in performance art with the Greenlandic artist Jessie Kleemann. In 2012, at the Liverpool Biennial, she and Kleemann were presenting Sassuma Arnaa (Mother of the Sea).

It is, however, thanks to her novels that Mondrup has gained recognition. Her early works, Ved slusen (2009), Store Malene (2013) and Godhavn (2014) are all closely associated with Greenland. Not until 2016 with the family conflicts in Karenminde does she move into Denmark itself. Vi er brødre (2018) shows how two brothers develop in completely different directions after World War II.

Returning to Greenland with the highly acclaimed Tabita (2020), the first in a trilogy, Mondrup reveals the tragic lives of adopted Greenlandic children. Equally successful, the second installment, Vittu (2022), shows what sentiments of love and betrayal can be experienced by adopted children. The third book in the trilogy, Bjørn, continues the story of adopted Greenlandic children.

== Awards ==
For her novel Godhavn, Mondrup was awarded Danmarks Radio's Novel Prize in 2015. In 2017, for Karensminde she won the Blixen Prize for fiction.
