= Anne-Birthe Hove =

Greenlandic graphic artist (1951–2012)

Anne-Birthe Hove (1951–2012) was a Greenlandic graphic artist. Many of her works portray the relationship between people and nature and reflect a specifically-Greenlandic identity and politics. Hove was born in Aasiaat and was educated at the Graphic Department at the Academy of Fine Arts in Copenhagen.

Nuuk Art Museum's collection includes 14 lithographs of Sermitsiaq created by Hove. She illustrated several stamps for Post Greenland, beginning in 1997. For several years she presided over KIMIK, a Greenlandic artist's association.
