= Aka Høegh =

Greenlandic artist (b. 1947)

- Born: Nukardleq Najâraq Eva Høegh; 16 December 1947 (age 78); Qutdligssat, North Greenland
- Education: Royal Danish Academy of Fine Arts
- Notable work: Stone and Man
- Awards: Nersornaat

Aka Høegh (born 16 December 1947) is a Greenlandic painter, graphic artist, and sculptor.

== Career ==
Høegh has worked in a variety of media, including painting, drawing, printmaking (lithographs), and sculpting.

In her art, Høegh focuses on nationalistic expressionism, creating art which reflects local, traditional myths, and is steeped in heritage and local lore. She frequently incorporates legend, nature, and provincial mythos into her works, devising strong connections between her art and local tradition. Her work, which started to take off in the early 1970s, "was foundational for how she generated relational spaces of intimacy within the politics of representation," and her pieces "center Kalaallit identity through composite vignettes that relationally center women (and the artist) and the land in intergenerational knowledge transfer".

Høegh illustrated Knud Rasmussen's Myths and Legends.

In 1986, she provided interior design for the new church in Tasiilaq.

She is best known for heading the art project "Stone and Man" (1993-1994), which established a sculpture garden in her home town of Qaqortoq in southern Greenland. The work is a dynamic, ongoing piece, with more pieces being added to at semi-regular intervals. Initially, 18 artists from Sweden, Finland, Norway, and the Faroe Islands participated in the project.

As a member of the international artist group "Art for Life", Høegh cooperated with 11 other artists in 1991 to produce the world's largest painting in Elche, Spain. The paintings size is 24,644 square meters.

Apart from being guest student at the Academy of Arts in Copenhagen, Høegh is an autodidact.

In September 2013 she was honoured of Nersornaat order.

=== Exhibitions and international co-operation ===
Høegh has had solo exhibitions in Greenland, Denmark, Faroe Islands, Iceland, Alaska, Germany, Finland, Sweden, Latvia, and Norway, as well as group exhibitions over most of Europe. She represented Greenland in "Scandinavia Today" in the United States, Mexico, and Lithuania.

Høegh's art can be found on many public buildings in Greenland. The mosaic relief outside the Workers' Folk High School in Qaqortoq is her work. The chimney of the new power plant is adorned by her artwork, as well.

== Personal life ==
Høegh was born in Qullissat on Disko Island, but grew up in Qaqortoq in her childhood.

Høegh has been married to photographer and film artist Ivars Silis since 1976. The couple have two children, Inuk Silis Høegh (b. 1972) and Bolatta Silis Høegh (b. 1981), both of whom are artists.
