= Greenland National Museum =

History museum in Nuuk, Greenland

Coordinates: 64.1772°N 51.7462°W

- Nunatta Katersugaasivia Allagaateqarfialu

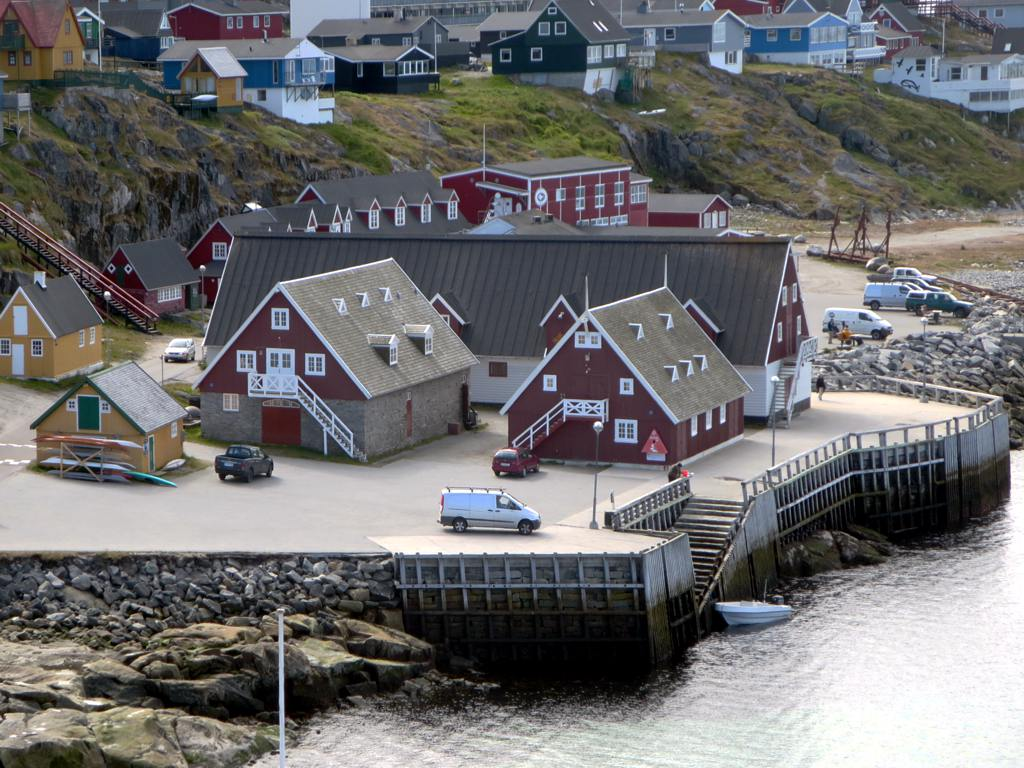

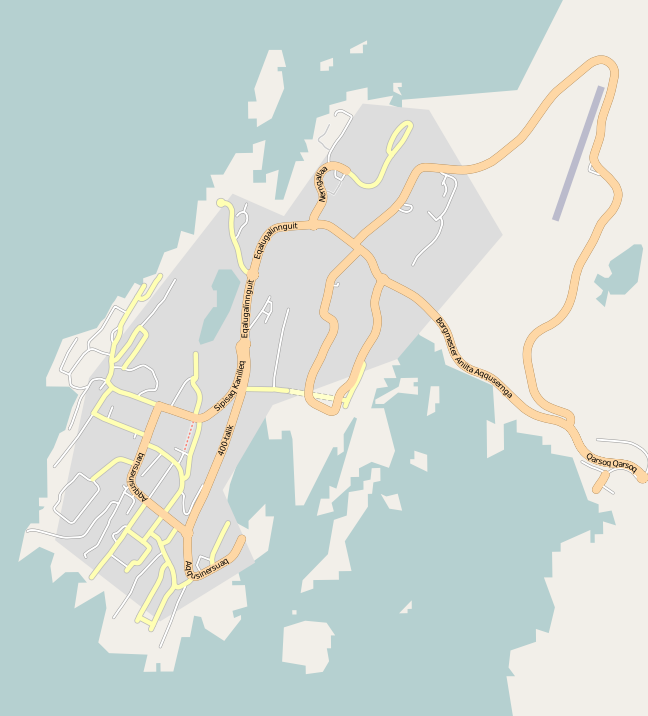
- Location within Nuuk
- Established: 1965
- Location: Nuuk, Greenland
- Type: Historical museum
- Website: https://en.nka.gl/

The Greenland National Museum (Greenlandic: Nunatta Katersugaasivia Allagaateqarfialu) is located in Nuuk, the capital of Greenland. It was one of the first museums established in Greenland, inaugurated in the mid-1960s. The museum has many artefacts related to archaeology, history, art, and handicrafts and also has information about ruins, graveyards, buildings etc. It is based in a warehouse which was built in 1936.

== History ==
The museum's first exhibition opened in 1965 in Greenland's Moravian Brethren Mission House. It moved to its present location in Nuuk's old colonial harbor in the 1970s due to the expansion of its collection with repatriated native Inuit items from the National Museum of Denmark. In 1991, the National Museum and National Archives were reorganized as the Greenland National Museum & Archives, yet today the archives are located at Ilimmarfik.

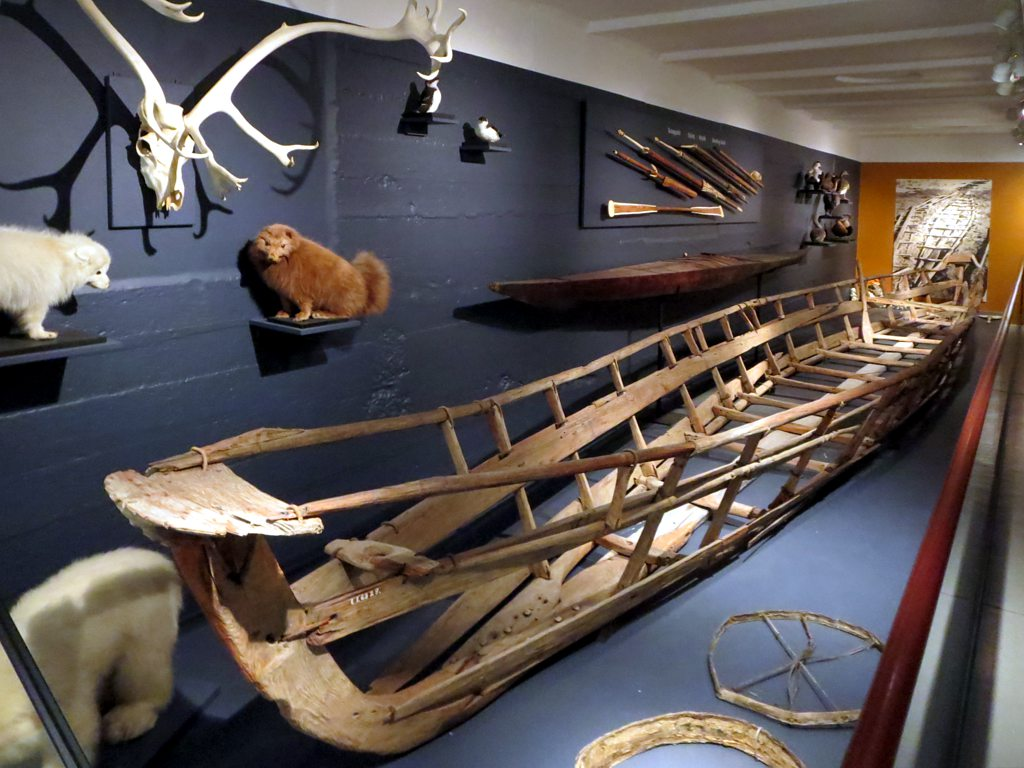
A umiak on display

== Qilakitsoq mummies ==
A major display in the museum is the Qilakitsoq mummies. The museum holds the mummies of three women and a six-month-old child dating to the mid-15th-century.

== Other displays ==
The museum also houses a display on social change in the 1950s, and one on geology. Several other nearby buildings also fall under the museum's protection, such as the restocked cooper's workshop and a display on blubber vats and presses.
