= Hans Lynge =

Greenlandic politician and artist (1906–1988)

Hans Lynge (born 1906 in Nuuk, died 1988 in Haderslev) was a Greenlandic writer, dramatist, painter, politician, printmaker, and sculptor. Many of his sculptures involve mothers or indigenous heroes, but he also did official sculptures of well known Greenlanders. His paintings draw on similar themes of Greenlandic legend and mothers while having the European influence of Impressionism. He played a role in the history of Greenland theatre as well. He also wrote several books depicting Nuuk.

His father was pastor Niels Lynge who was a painter in his own right.
