= Sermitsiaq =

Sermitsiaq may refer to:

- Sermitsiaq (mountain), on Sermitsiaq Island
- Sermitsiaq (newspaper), a Greenlandic newspaper
- Sermitsiaq Island, in the Nuup Kangerlua fjord, Greenland
- Sermitsiaq Glacier, in western Greenland
