= Qoornoq =

Uninhabited village in Greenland

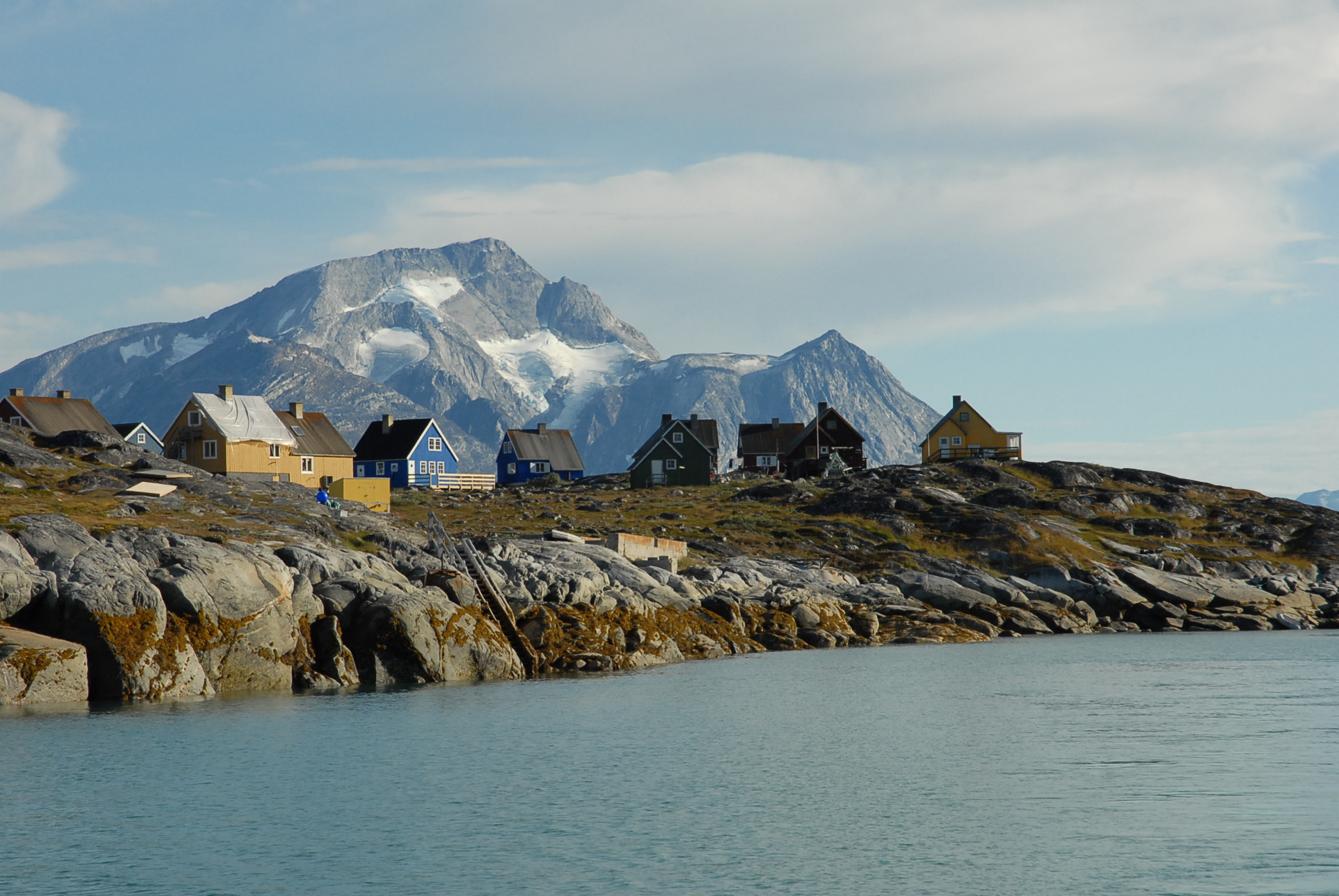

- Location within Greenland
- Coordinates: 64°32′00″N 51°05′40″W
- State: Kingdom of Denmark
- Constituent country: Greenland
- Municipality: Sermersooq
- First settled: 2200 BCE
- Abandoned: 1972
- Time zone: UTC-03

Qoornoq (old spelling: Qôrnoq) is an uninhabited fishing village in the Sermersooq municipality in southwestern Greenland.

== History ==
The area was known to have been inhabited by the ancient pre-Inuit, Paleo-Eskimo people of the Saqqaq culture as far back as 2200 BC. It still contains archaeological ruins of ancient Inuit and Norse buildings. The site was excavated in 1952 and the remains of an old Norse farm and ancient tools were discovered. The outside walls of the farm are double hatched and contain several Inuit houses. The last permanent resident left in 1972. Descendants of former residents often come to their houses in the summer by boat.

Qoornoq also once had a railway used for transporting fish. The railway was used in the 1950s, with a small diesel-hydraulic locomotive hauling flat wagons full of fish. The line closed shortly before the town's last resident left.

== Geography ==
Qoornoq is located on the northeastern coast of the Qoornuup Qeqertarsua Island in the Nuup Kangerlua fjord, to the northeast of Nuuk, the capital of Greenland.
