= Coat of arms of Nuuk =

- Armiger: Nuuk
- Adopted: 1986
- Shield: Azure, the red siminar standing on a small island, with three sets of waves in front, and Mt. Sermitsiaq standing behind all proper.

The coat of arms of Nuuk is a design of mostly blue and white, with a red building in the center known as the "red siminar", the teachers' training college of Nuuk, Greenland, and a yellow paddle floating in the water in front of it. There are three sets of white waves in front of the paddle, and Mt. Sermitsiaq in the background. The coat of arms was designed by Ejner Heilmann and Sven Tito Achmen. The design was copyrighted in 1986.

== Symbolism ==
Mt. Sermitsiaq, the mountain in the background, is the civic symbol of Nuuk. The red siminar, with gold windows and a weathercock, represents education and culture, while the yellow paddle, also known as the "kayak paddle", symbolizes the way of life of the indigenous peoples of Greenland, hunters of fish and other sea creatures; most importantly, it also symbolizes that Nuuk is the true power of Greenland. The blue and white waves, which are collected in three sets, growing larger as they get to the red siminar, represent two different things: the blue waves represent the sea fjord near Nuuk, and the white waves represent the sea ice.

== Flag ==
The coat of arms, against a plain white background, is also used on Nuuk's flag.
