= Nuuk =

Capital and largest city of Greenland

- Capital city
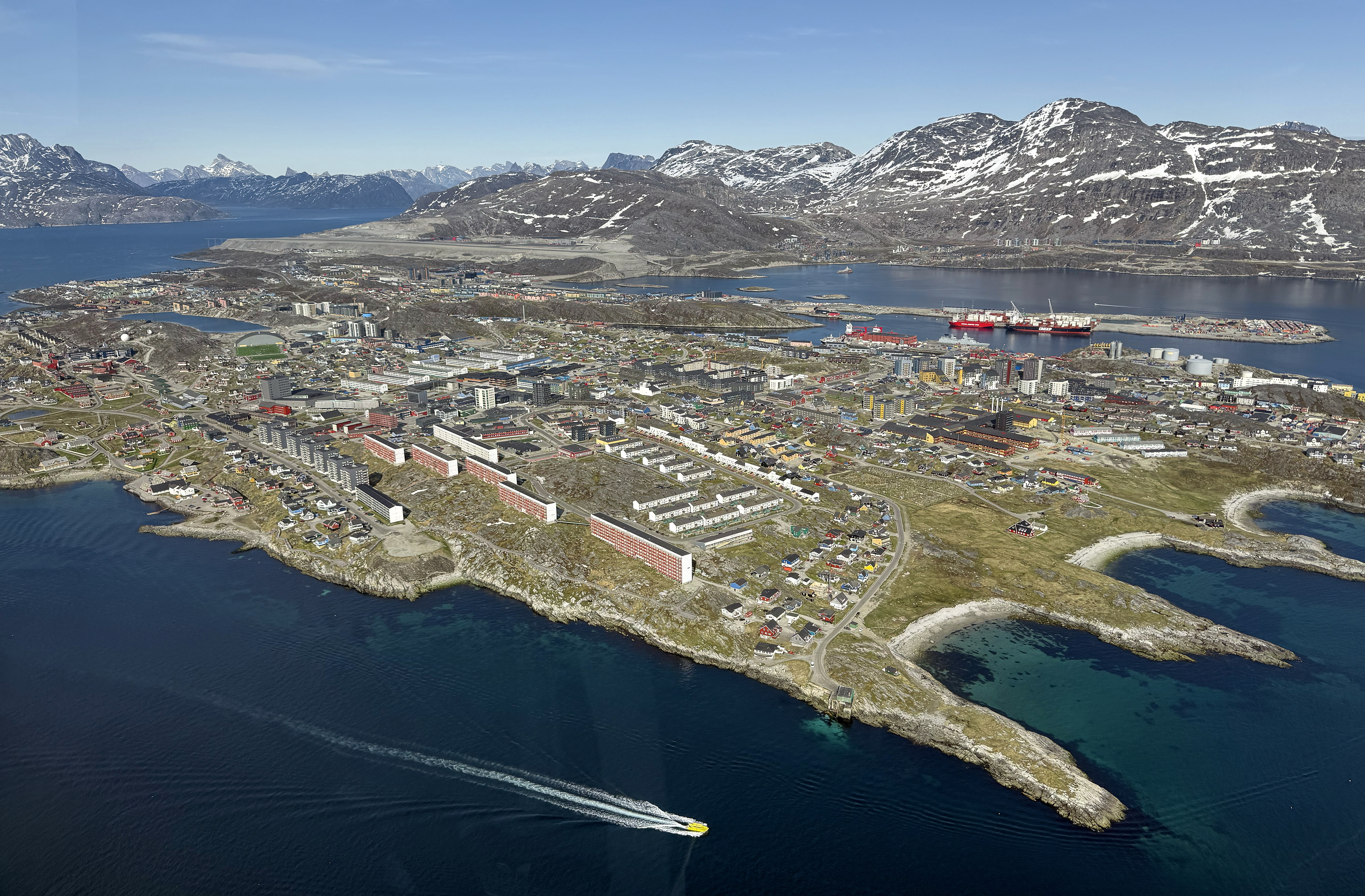
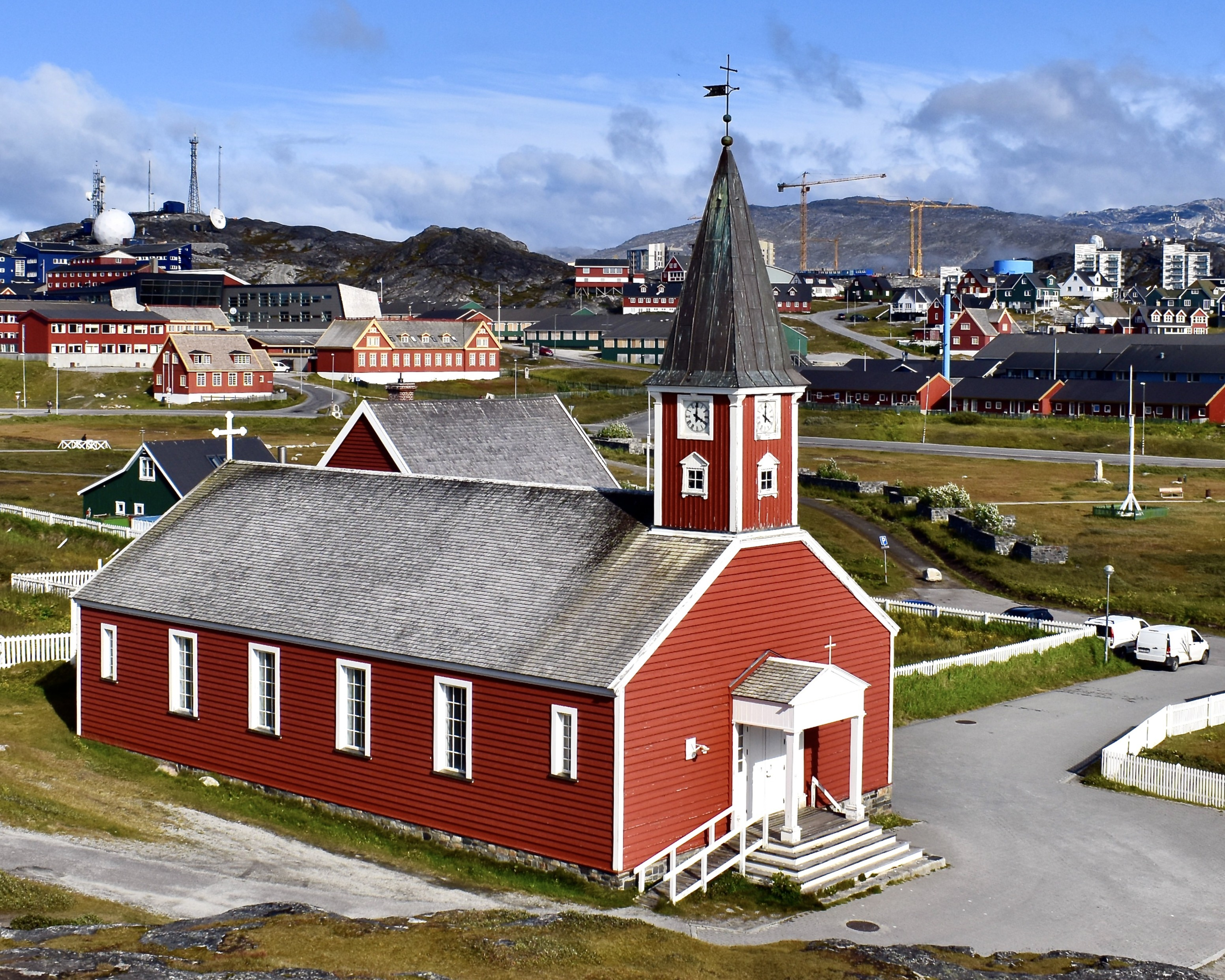
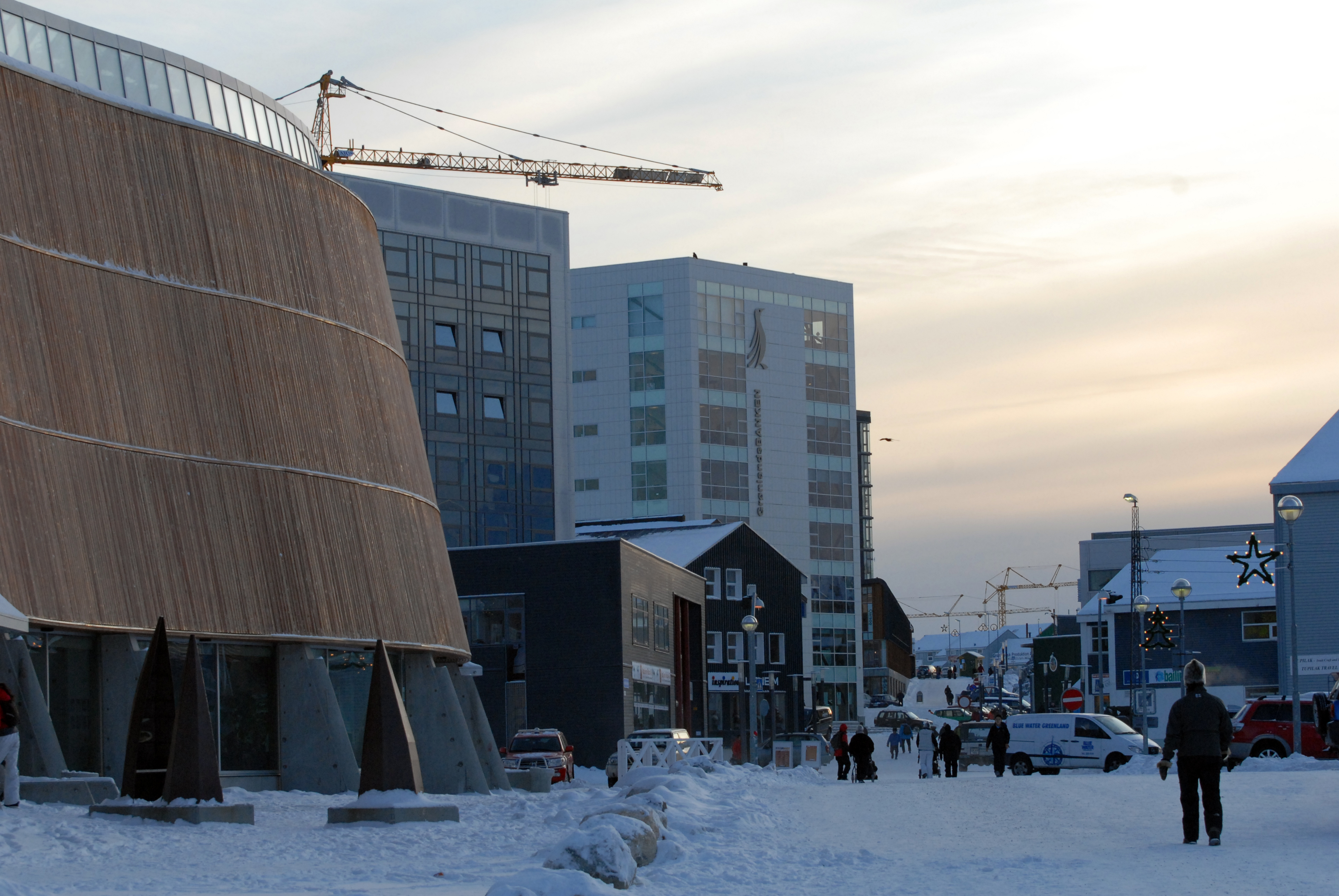
- Aerial view of Nuuk Nuuk Cathedral Downtown around Katuaq

- Flag Coat of arms
- Interactive map of Nuuk
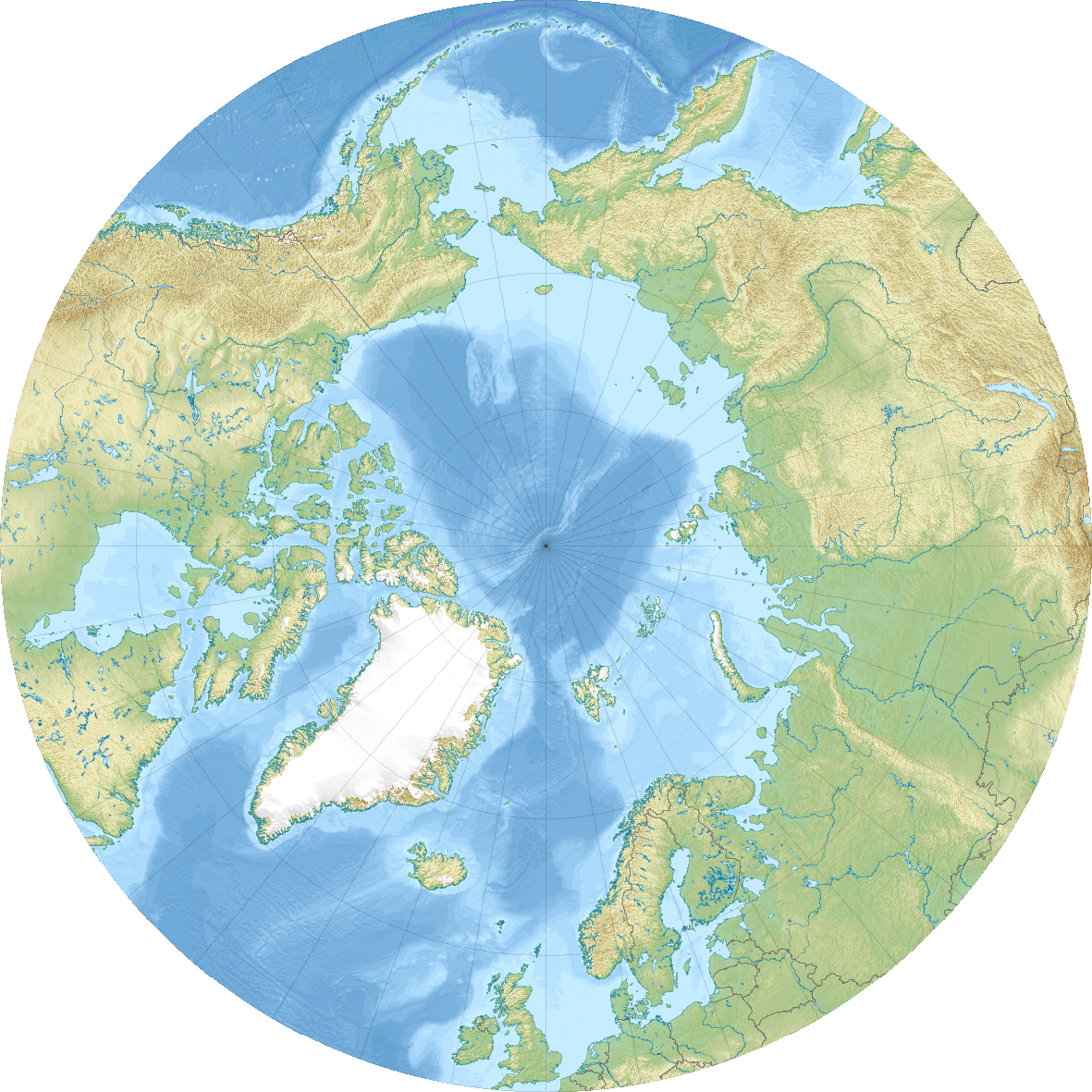
- Location within Greenland Location within North America Location within Arctic
- Coordinates: 64°10′36″N 51°44′10″W
- Sovereign state: Kingdom of Denmark
- Autonomous Territory: Greenland
- Municipality: Sermersooq
- Founded: 29 August 1728
- Incorporated: 1728

Area
  - Total: 49 km^{2} (18.8 sq mi)
- Elevation: 5 m (16 ft)

Population (2026)
  - Total: 20,298 (Largest in Greenland)
  - Density: 417/km^{2} (1,080/sq mi)
- (Note: City and metropolitan population is co-extensive, the entire Metro area belongs to Nuuk City)
- Demonym: Nuummioq
- Time zone: UTC−02:00 (WGT)
  - Summer (DST): UTC−01:00 (WGST)
- Postal code: 3900, 3905
- Website: sermersooq.gl

Nuuk (Greenlandic pronunciation: [nuːk]; formerly Danish: Godthåb) is the capital and most populous city of Greenland, an autonomous territory of Denmark. It is the seat of the Sermersooq municipality and the government of Greenland and is the territory's largest cultural and economic center. In January 2025, it had a population of 20,113—more than a third of the territory's population—making it one of the smallest capital cities in the world by population.

The city was founded in 1728 by the Danish-Norwegian missionary Hans Egede when he relocated from the earlier Hope Colony (Haabets Koloni), where he had arrived in 1721; the governor Claus Paarss was part of the relocation. The new colony was placed at the Inuit settlement of Nûk and named Godthaab ('good hope'). Nuuk is the Greenlandic word for 'cape' and is commonly found in Greenlandic place names. It is so named because of its position at the end of the Nuup Kangerlua fjord on the Labrador Sea's eastern shore. Its latitude, at 64°11' N, makes it the world's northernmost capital, a few kilometres farther north than Reykjavík. When home rule was established in 1979, the authorization of place names was transferred to Greenlandic authorities, who preferred Greenlandic names to Danish ones. The name Godthåb mostly went out of use over the next two decades.

== History ==
=== Early settlement ===
The site has a long history of habitation. The area around Nuuk was first occupied by the ancient, pre-Inuit, Paleo-Eskimo people of the Saqqaq culture as far back as 2200 BCE, when they lived in the area around the now abandoned settlement of Qoornoq. For a long time, it was occupied by the Dorset culture around the former settlement of Kangeq, but they disappeared from the Nuuk district before 1000 AD. The Nuuk area was then inhabited by Norse settlers from around 1000 until the disappearance of the settlement for uncertain reasons during the 15th century.

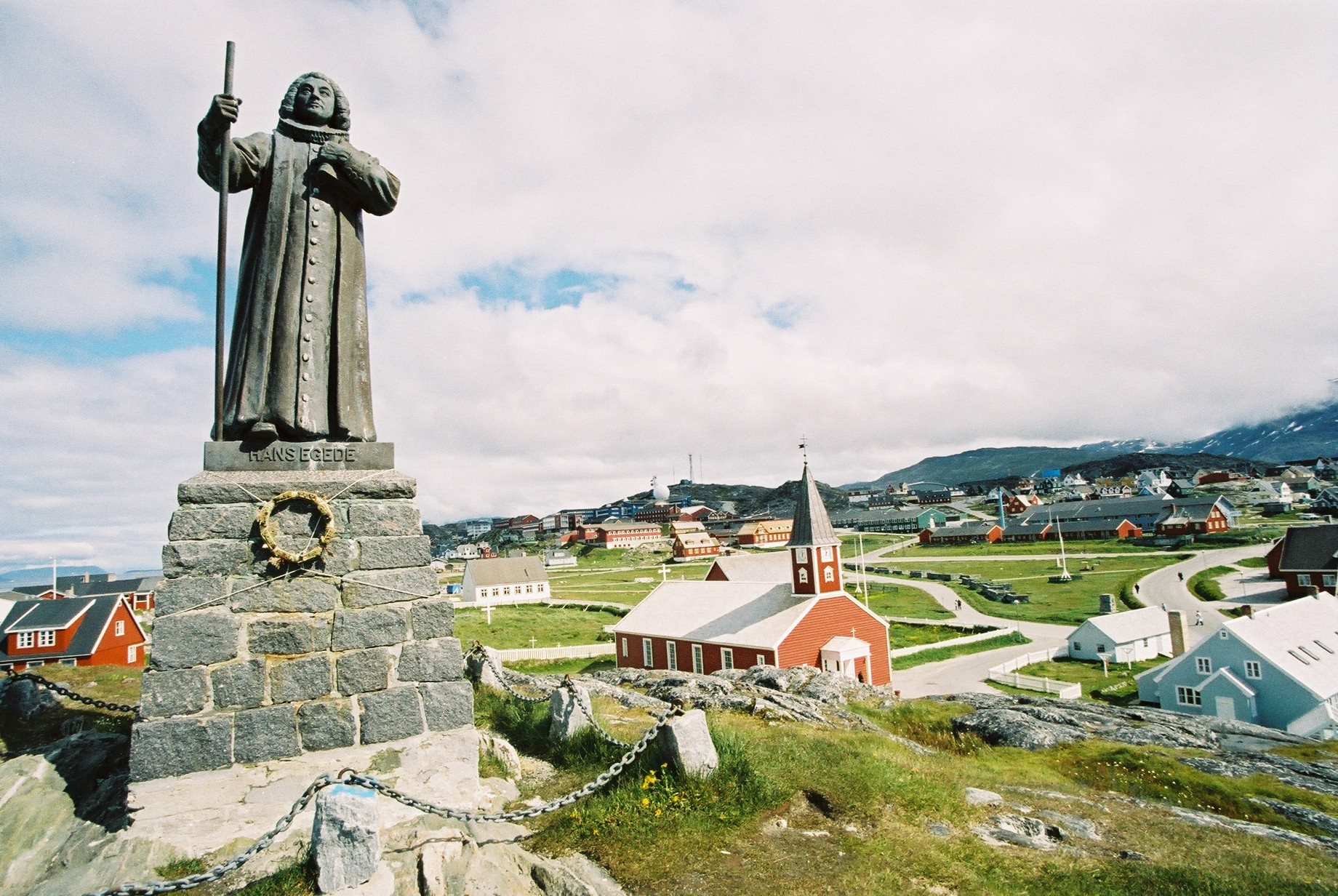
The statue of Hans Egede in Nuuk

=== Founding and early colonial period ===
The city proper was founded as the fort of Godt-Haab in 1728 by the royal governor Claus Paarss, when he relocated the missionary and merchant Hans Egede's earlier Hope Colony (Haabets Koloni) from Kangeq Island to the mainland.

At that time, Greenland was formally still a Norwegian colony under the united Danish-Norwegian Crown, but the colony had not had any contact for over three centuries. Paarss's colonists were mutinous soldiers, convicts, and prostitutes; within the first year, most died of scurvy and other ailments.

In 1733 and 1734, a smallpox epidemic killed most of the native population as well as Egede's wife. Hans Egede returned to Denmark in 1736 after 15 years in Greenland, leaving his son Poul to continue his work.

Godthaab became the seat of government for the Danish colony of South Greenland, while Godhavn (modern Qeqertarsuaq) was the capital of North Greenland until 1940, when the administration was unified in Godthaab.

=== Missionary settlements ===
In 1733, Moravian missionaries received permission to begin a mission on the island; in 1747, there were enough converts to prompt the construction of the Moravian Brethren Mission House and the formal establishment of the mission as New Herrnhut (Danish: Nye-Hernhut).

This became the nucleus of present-day Nuuk as many Greenlanders from the southeastern coast left their territory to live at the mission station. From this base, further missions were established at Lichtenfels (1748), Lichtenau (1774), Friedrichsthal (1824), Umanak (1861), and Idlorpait (1864), before they were discontinued in 1900 and folded into the Lutheran Church of Denmark.

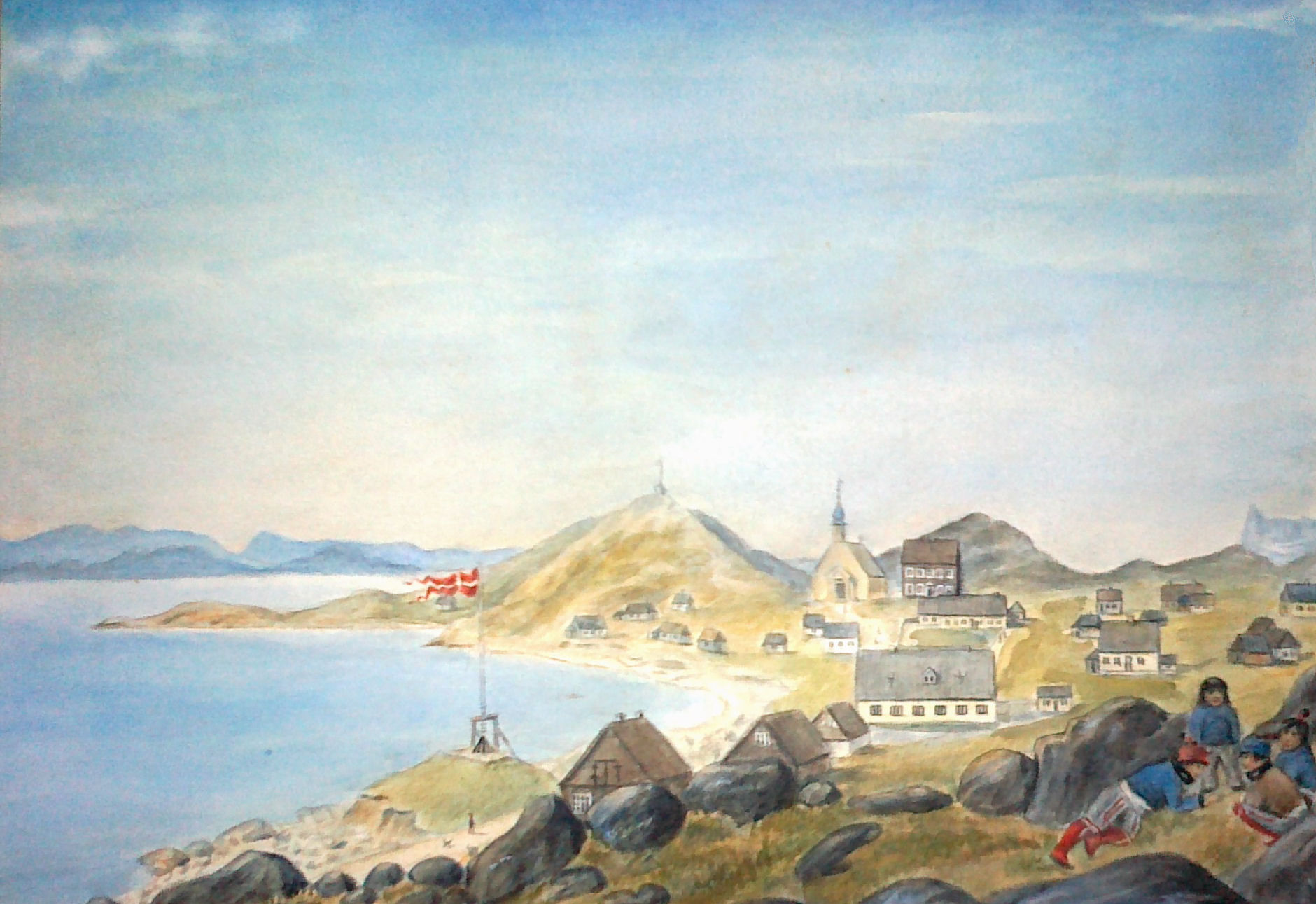
Nuuk (Danish: Godthåb), c. 1878

=== Cultural and political developments ===
In 1853, Hinrich Johannes Rink came to Greenland and was surprised at how local Greenlandic culture and identity had been suppressed under Danish influence.

In response, in 1861, he started the Atuagagdliutit, Greenland's first newspaper, with a native Greenlander as editor. This newspaper based in Nuuk later became an important token of Greenlandic identity.

=== World War II and postwar changes ===
During World War II, there was a reawakening of Greenlandic national identity. The use of written Greenlandic grew, and a council was assembled under Eske Brun's leadership in Nuuk. In 1940, an American and a Canadian Consulate were established in Nuuk.

Under new regulations in 1950, two councils amalgamated into one. This Countryside Council was abolished on 1 May 1979, when the Greenland Home Rule government renamed the city of Godthåb to Nuuk.

The city boomed during the 1950s when Denmark began to modernize Greenland. Nuuk is populated today by both Inuit and Danes, as is Greenland as a whole. Over a third of Greenland's population lives in the Nuuk Greater Metropolitan area.

According to a 2016 article in The Guardian examining indigenous influences on cities worldwide:

One city ... stands out. Nuuk ... has probably the highest percentage of aboriginal people of any city: almost 90% of Greenland's population of 58,000 is Inuit, and at least eight in 10 live in urban settlements. Nuuk also celebrates Inuit culture and history to an extent that is unprecedented in many cities with higher total aboriginal populations. By proportion and by cultural authority and impact, it may well be tiny Nuuk that is the most indigenous city in the world.

== Geography ==
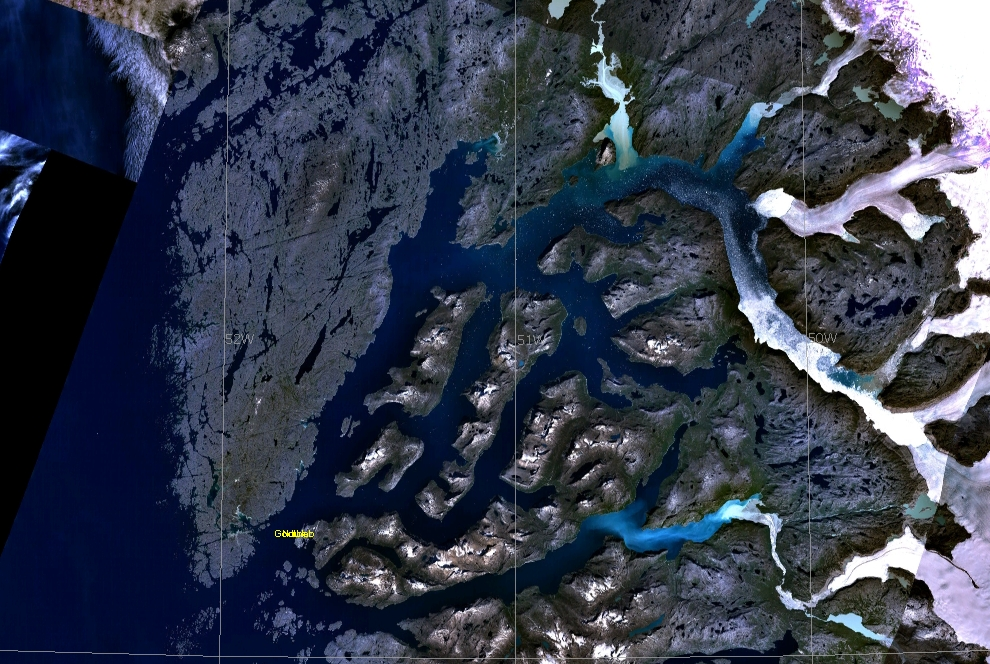
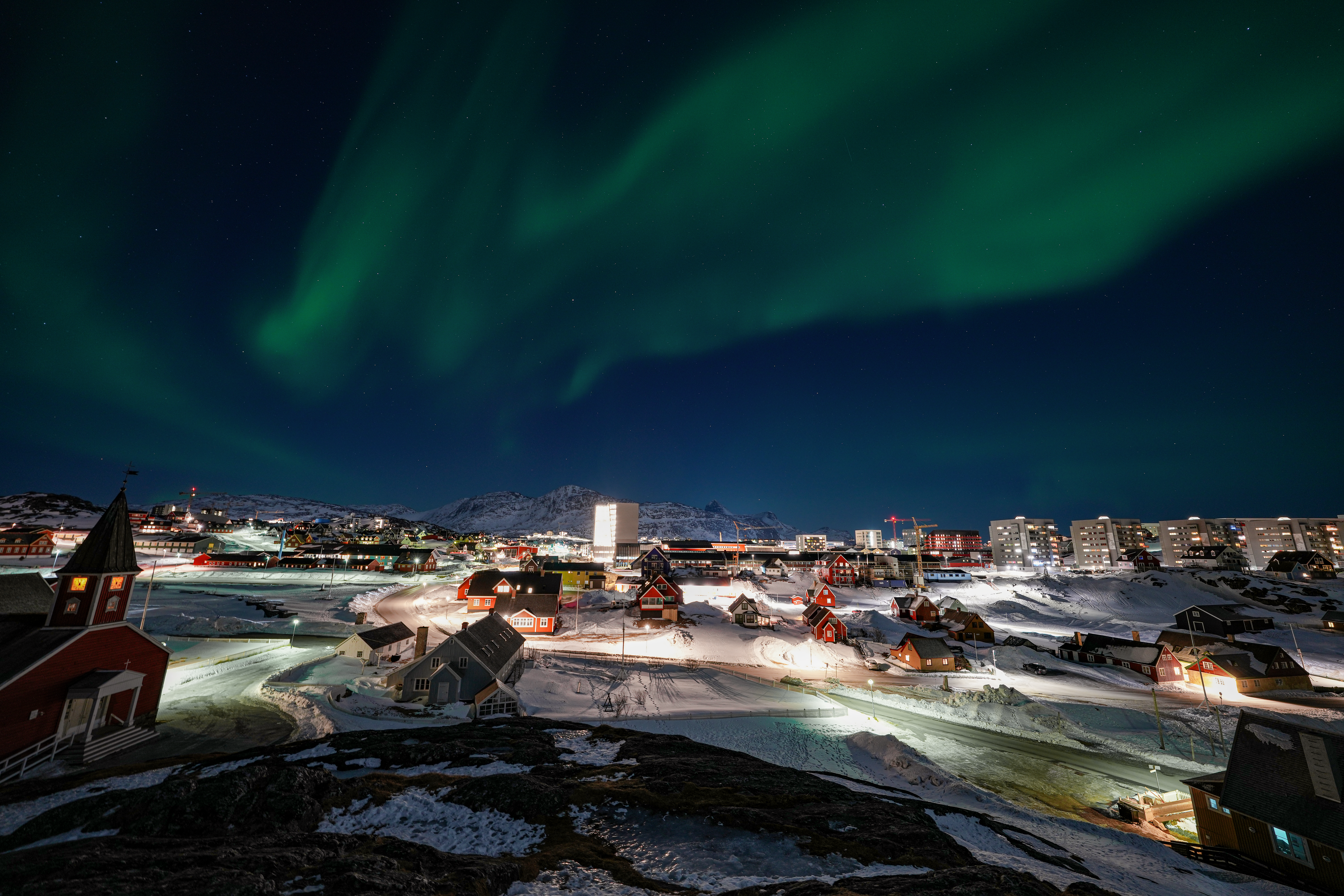
Left: Satellite view. Right: Nuuk in winter.

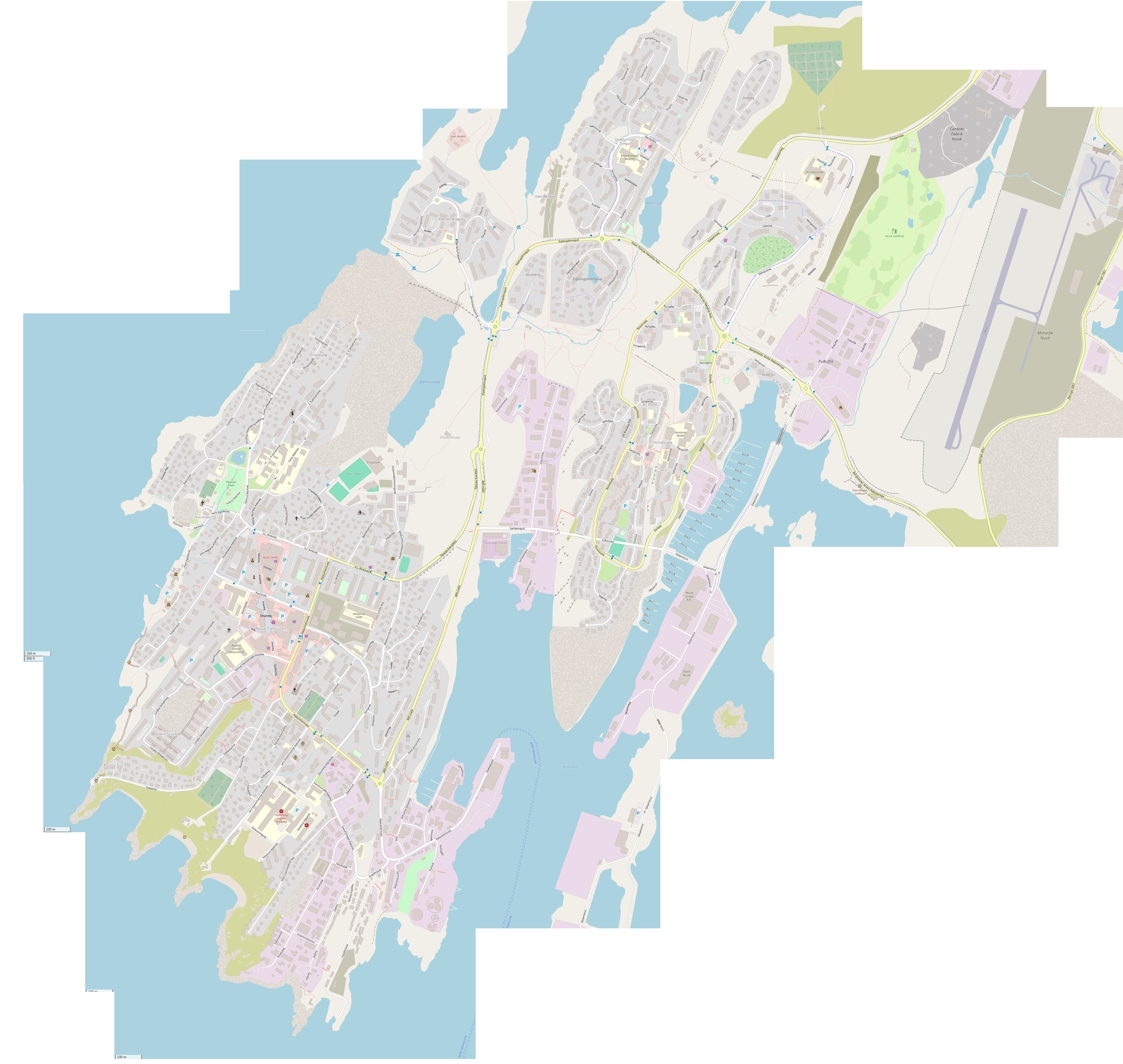
Map of Nuuk

Nuuk is located around 64°10′N 51°44′W, at the mouth of the Nuup Kangerlua fjord (formerly Baal's River), 10 km (6.2 mi) from the shores of the Labrador Sea on Greenland's southwestern coast and about 240 km (150 mi) south of the Arctic Circle. The fjord flows to the northwest, then turns southwest at 64°43′N 50°37′W, splitting into three arms in its lower run, with three big islands between the arms: Sermitsiaq Island, Qeqertarsuaq Island, and Qoornuup Qeqertarsua. The fjord widens into a bay dotted with skerries near its mouth, opening into Labrador Sea at approximately 64°03′N 51°58′W. Sermitsiaq mountain, reaching a height of 1,210 m (3,970 ft), 20 km (12 mi) to the northeast, can be seen from almost everywhere in Nuuk. The nationwide newspaper Sermitsiaq takes its name from the mountain. Closer to the town are the peaks of Store Malene, 790 m (2,590 ft), and Lille Malene, 420 m (1,380 ft). The magnetic declination at Nuuk is extreme.

View from the mountain Ukkusissaq, which means "soap stone" (in Danish it is called Store Malene.)
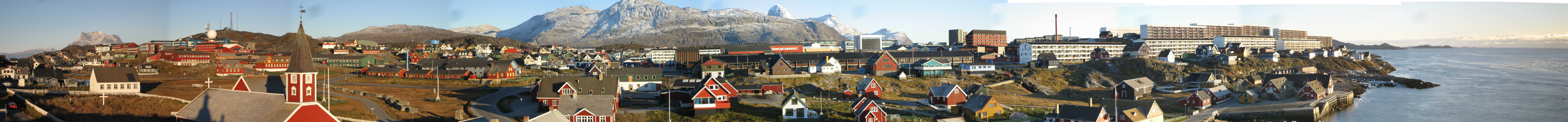
Panorama of Nuuk

=== Climate ===
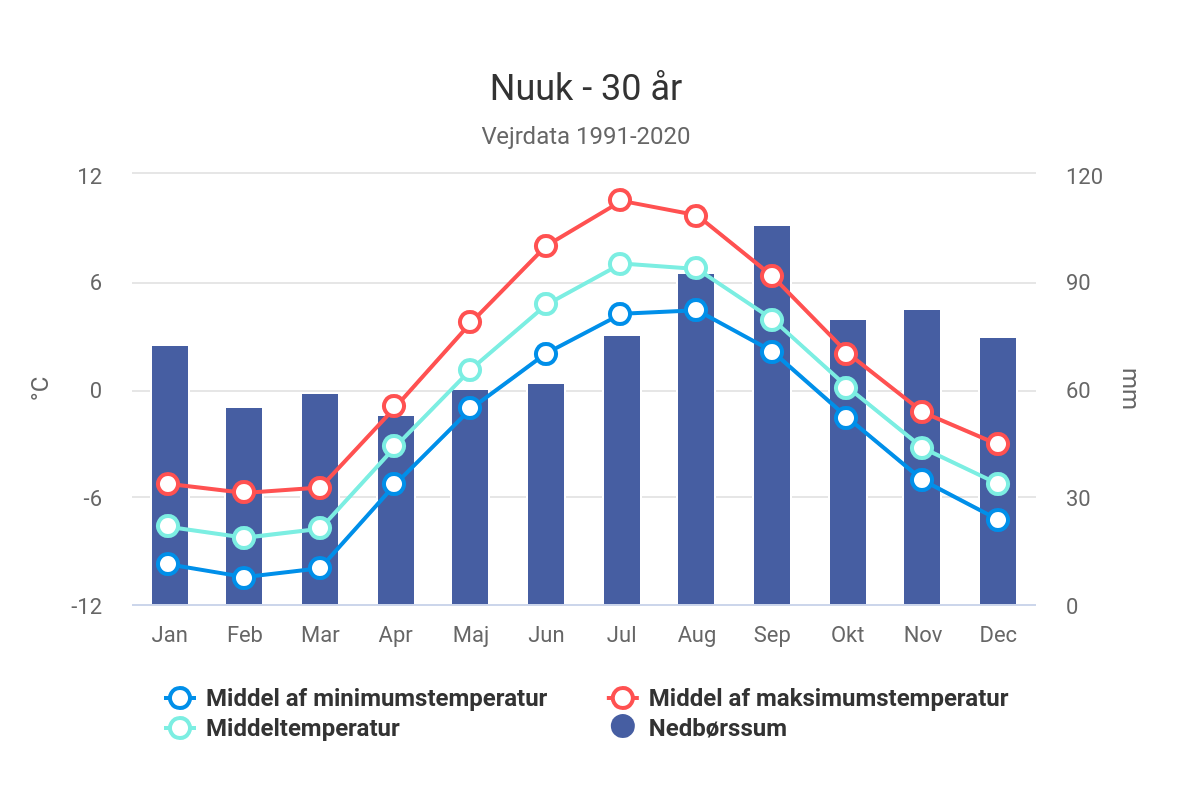
Climate chart of Nuuk

Nuuk has a maritime-influenced tundra climate (Köppen ET) with long, cold, snowy winters and short, cold summers. Although the winters are very cold, they are still milder than those in other tundra climates at similar latitudes, such as Alaska or parts of Eastern Siberia. Instead, peak winter is similar to identical latitudes in the Nordic countries. On 21 December, the shortest day and longest night of the year, the sun rises at 11:22 am and sets at 3:28 pm. On 21 June, the longest day and shortest night of the year, the sun sets at 1:03 am and rises at 3:53 am, producing constant civil twilight. Nuuk occasionally has mild temperatures year-round, with each month having recorded 13 °C (55 °F) or warmer, although only June, July, August, and September have recorded what could be considered hot weather (defined as 22.5 °C (72.5 °F) or higher). The monthly averages range from −9 °C (16 °F) to 7 °C (45 °F), whereas all-time extremes range from −32.5 °C (−26.5 °F) on 14 January 1984 to 26.3 °C (79.3 °F) on 6 July 2008. The record wind in Nuuk is 68 km/h.

The average monthly temperature (7.4 °C (45.3 °F) in July) is colder than what is considered the limit for trees (10 °C (50 °F) during the warmest month). There are a few planted trees, which do not sustain well.

Climate data for Nuuk (1991–2020 normals, extremes 1866–present)
Month	Jan	Feb	Mar	Apr	May	Jun	Jul	Aug	Sep	Oct	Nov	Dec	Year
Record high °C (°F)	15.3 (59.5)	13.0 (55.4)	15.2 (59.4)	16.9 (62.4)	18.3 (64.9)	23.8 (74.8)	26.3 (79.3)	25.1 (77.2)	23.8 (74.8)	19.9 (67.8)	15.8 (60.4)	13.3 (55.9)	26.3 (79.3)
Mean daily maximum °C (°F)	−5.0 (23.0)	−6.0 (21.2)	−5.1 (22.8)	−0.7 (30.7)	3.9 (39.0)	8.4 (47.1)	11.1 (52.0)	10.2 (50.4)	6.5 (43.7)	2.3 (36.1)	−1.1 (30.0)	−3.2 (26.2)	1.8 (35.2)
Daily mean °C (°F)	−7.5 (18.5)	−8.6 (16.5)	−7.7 (18.1)	−3.0 (26.6)	1.2 (34.2)	5.0 (41.0)	7.4 (45.3)	7.0 (44.6)	4.0 (39.2)	0.2 (32.4)	−3.3 (26.1)	−5.5 (22.1)	−0.9 (30.4)
Mean daily minimum °C (°F)	−9.7 (14.5)	−10.9 (12.4)	−10.0 (14.0)	−5.2 (22.6)	−1.2 (29.8)	2.0 (35.6)	4.4 (39.9)	4.5 (40.1)	2.0 (35.6)	−1.8 (28.8)	−5.3 (22.5)	−7.7 (18.1)	−3.3 (26.1)
Record low °C (°F)	−32.5 (−26.5)	−29.6 (−21.3)	−27.5 (−17.5)	−30.0 (−22.0)	−19.0 (−2.2)	−10.3 (13.5)	−6.6 (20.1)	−4.7 (23.5)	−8.2 (17.2)	−16.6 (2.1)	−24.4 (−11.9)	−25.2 (−13.4)	−32.5 (−26.5)
Average precipitation mm (inches)	67.1 (2.64)	51.1 (2.01)	58.9 (2.32)	53.3 (2.10)	57.4 (2.26)	61.7 (2.43)	69.3 (2.73)	90.8 (3.57)	104.6 (4.12)	80.5 (3.17)	79.0 (3.11)	74.5 (2.93)	852.6 (33.57)
Average precipitation days (≥ 0.1 mm)	13.8	12.7	15.1	13.2	13.0	10.5	12.5	12.5	14.1	13.5	14.3	14.4	159.6
Average snowy days	13.6	12.1	14.5	11.4	9.4	2.8	0.1	0.2	4.3	9.8	12.7	13.8	104.7
Average relative humidity (%)	73.8	74.7	74.3	78.3	81.1	85.0	85.3	86.7	82.3	76.7	73.3	73.4	78.7
Mean monthly sunshine hours	15.5	65.0	148.8	180.0	189.1	204.0	195.3	164.3	141.0	80.6	30.0	6.2	1,419.8
Mean daily sunshine hours	0.5	2.3	4.8	6.0	6.1	6.8	6.3	5.3	4.7	2.6	1.0	0.2	3.9
Source 1: Danish Meteorological Institute
Source 2: Meteo Climat (record highs and lows), Deutscher Wetterdienst (sun 1980–1990), NOAA (humidity 1991-2020)

== Demographics ==
Historical population
Year	Pop.	±%
1980	9,077	—
1990	12,217	+34.6%
2000	13,445	+10.1%
2010	15,469	+15.1%
2020	18,326	+18.5%
Source: Statistics Greenland

With 19,872 inhabitants as of January 2024, Nuuk is by far Greenland's largest town. Its population has doubled since 1977, increased by over a third since 1990, and risen by almost 21% since 2000. In addition to those born in Greenland, data from 2015 showed 3,826 were born outside the country. Attracted by good employment opportunities with high wages, Danes have continued to settle in the town. Today, Nuuk has the highest proportion of Danes of any town in Greenland. Half of Greenland's immigrants live in Nuuk, which also has a quarter of the country's native population.

== Government ==
As the capital of Greenland, Nuuk is its administrative center, containing all important government buildings and institutions. The public sector bodies are also the town's largest employer.

As of January 2026, Nuuk's mayor is Avaaraq Olsen.

Greenland's self-government parliament, the Inatsisartut, sits in Nuuk. It has 31 seats and its members are elected by popular vote on the basis of proportional representation to serve four-year terms. All of Greenland's major political parties have their headquarters in Nuuk, including the Inuit Ataqatigiit, Siumut, Democrats, Atassut, Association of Candidates, and the Women's Party.

=== KANUKOKA ===
KANUKOKA (Greenlandic: Kalaallit Nunaanni Kommunit Kattuffiat) was based in Nuuk. It was an association of Greenland's municipalities, led by Enok Sandgreen. Its aim was to facilitate cooperation among all five municipalities of Greenland: Avannaata, Kujalleq, Qeqertalik, Qeqqata, and Sermersooq. But Sermersooq and Qeqertalik both withdrew and KANUKOKA dissolved on 31 July 2018. The organisation ran the municipal elections every four years, with the last election taking place in 2016. All municipal authorities in Greenland were members of the organisation until its dissolution. The association was overseen by Maliina Abelsen, the Minister for Social Affairs in the Government of Greenland.

== Economy ==
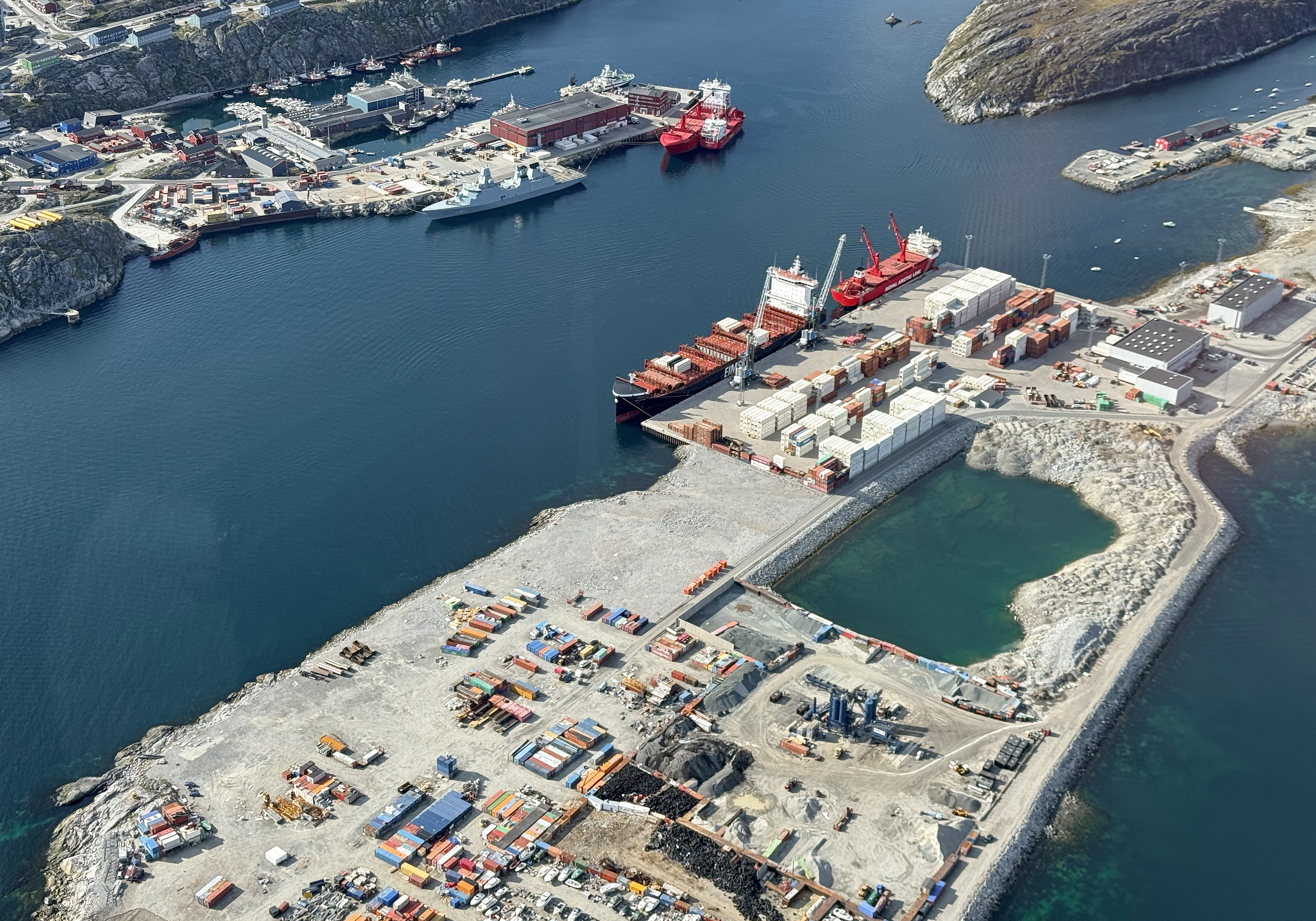
The Port of Nuuk

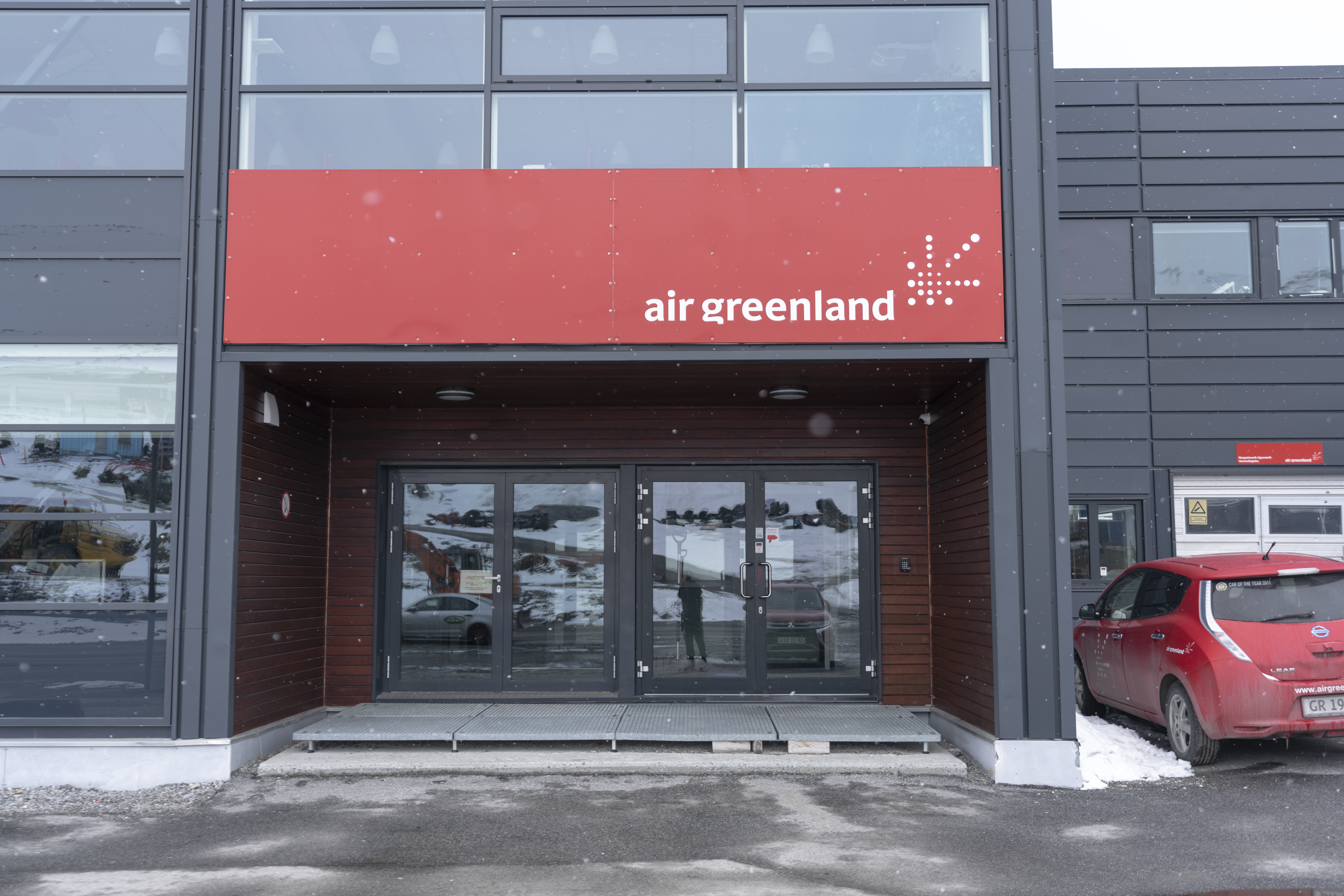
Air Greenland headquarters in Nuuk

Although only a small town, Nuuk has developed trade, business, shipping and other industries. It began as a small fishing settlement with a harbor, but as the economy developed rapidly during the 1970s and 1980s, Nuuk's fishing industry declined. Nuuk is nevertheless still home to almost half of Greenland's fishing fleet. The local Royal Greenland processing plant absorbs landed seafood amounting to over DKK 50 million (US$7 million) per annum, mainly (80%) shrimp, but also cod, lumpfish and halibut. Seafood, including seal, is also sold in abundance in Nuuk's fish markets, the largest being Kalaaliaraq Market. Minerals including zinc and gold have contributed to Nuuk's economic development.

Like much of Greenland, Nuuk heavily depends on Danish investment and relies on Denmark for block funding.

=== Energy ===
All of Greenland's electricity is supplied by the government-owned company Nukissiorfiit, which has a monopoly on it. Since 1993, Nuuk has received its electric power mainly from Buksefjord hydroelectric power plant by way of a 132 kV powerline crossing Ameralik fjord over a distance of 5,376 m (17,638 ft), the world's longest free span.

=== Education ===
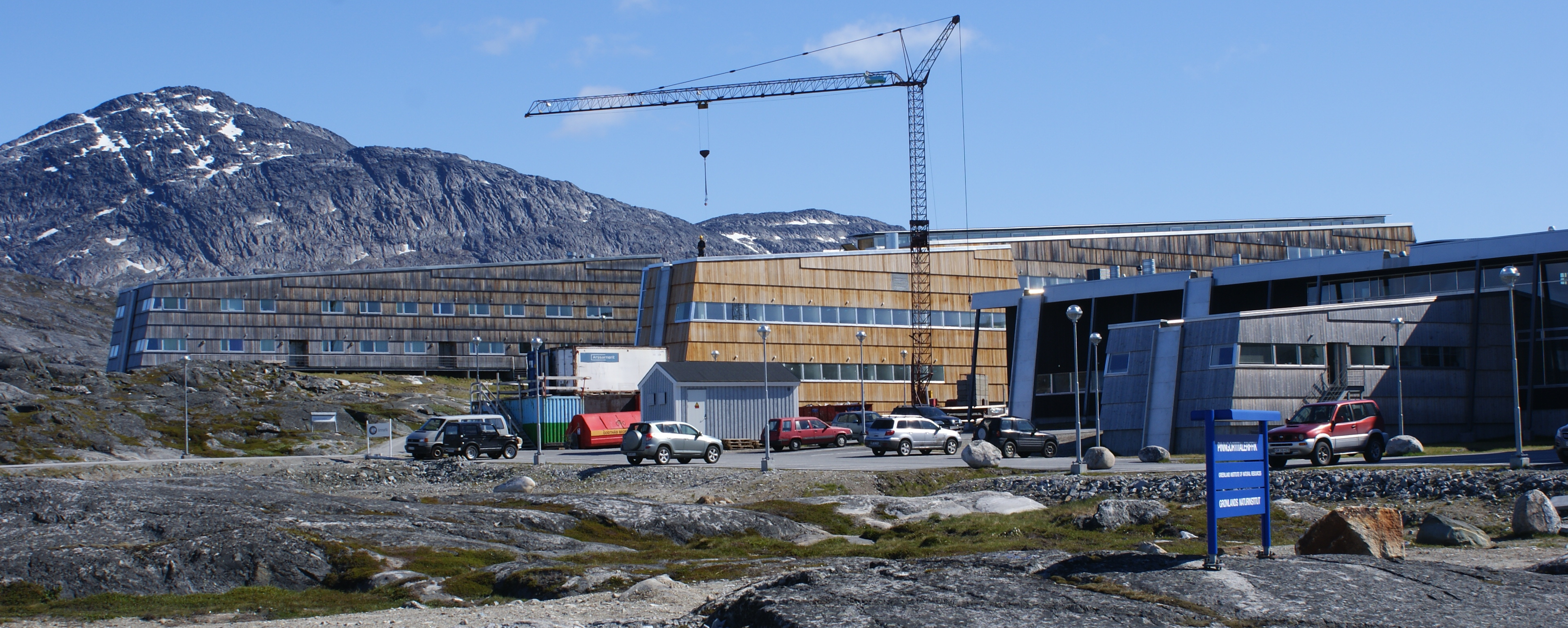
University of Greenland

Nuuk has several educational institutions of higher learning. The University of Greenland (Ilisimatusarfik), Greenland's only university, is in Nuuk. It was founded in 1987 and expanded in 2007 with the new building, Ilimmarfik, housing departments of journalism, management and economics, language, literature and media, cultural and social history, theology and religion, and social work. Nuuk is also home to the Department of Learning (Ilinniarfissuaq), Greenland's oldest educational facility, in the old colonial part of Nuuk (Nuutoqaq: Old Nuuk). Other notable educational institutions include the Department of Nursing and Health Science, Nuuk Technical College, and the Iron & Metal School.

=== Healthcare ===
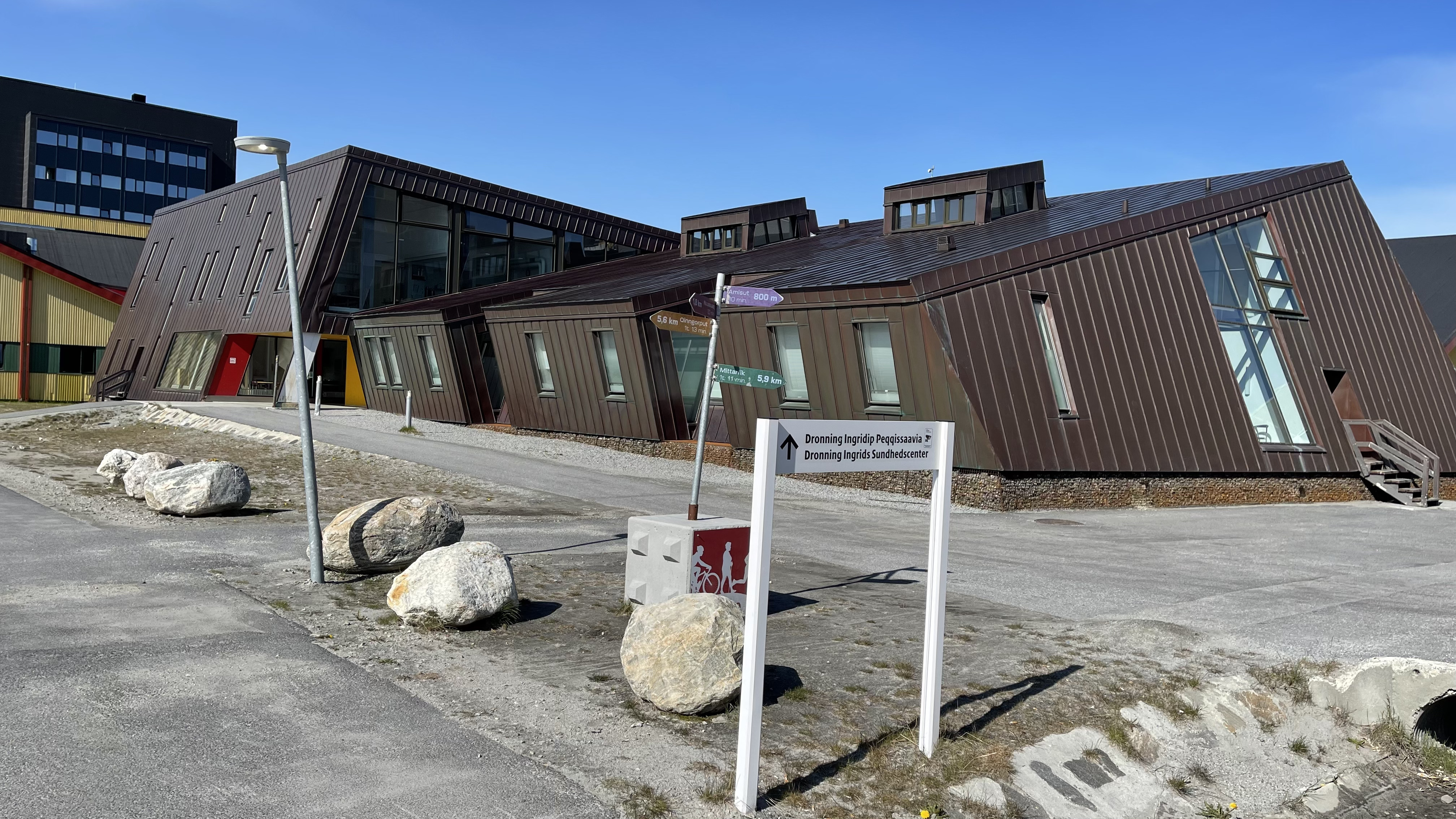
Queen Ingrid's Health Center

Nuuk is served by Queen Ingrid's Health Center, the regional health center for Region Sermersooq. It has an emergency room and a central clinic with several general practitioners. Nuuk also has Queen Ingrid's Hospital, Greenland's central hospital.

=== Tourism ===
The Nuuk Tourist Office was built in 1992 to house the headquarters of the new National Tourist Board of Greenland.

=== Shopping ===
Nuuk's shops offer local art and craftwork. In 2012, Greenland's first shopping center, Nuuk Center (NC), opened. The center has Greenland's first underground parking. Several supermarkets exist, such as Nuuk Center, Pisiffik, Brugseni, and Spar.

== Transportation ==
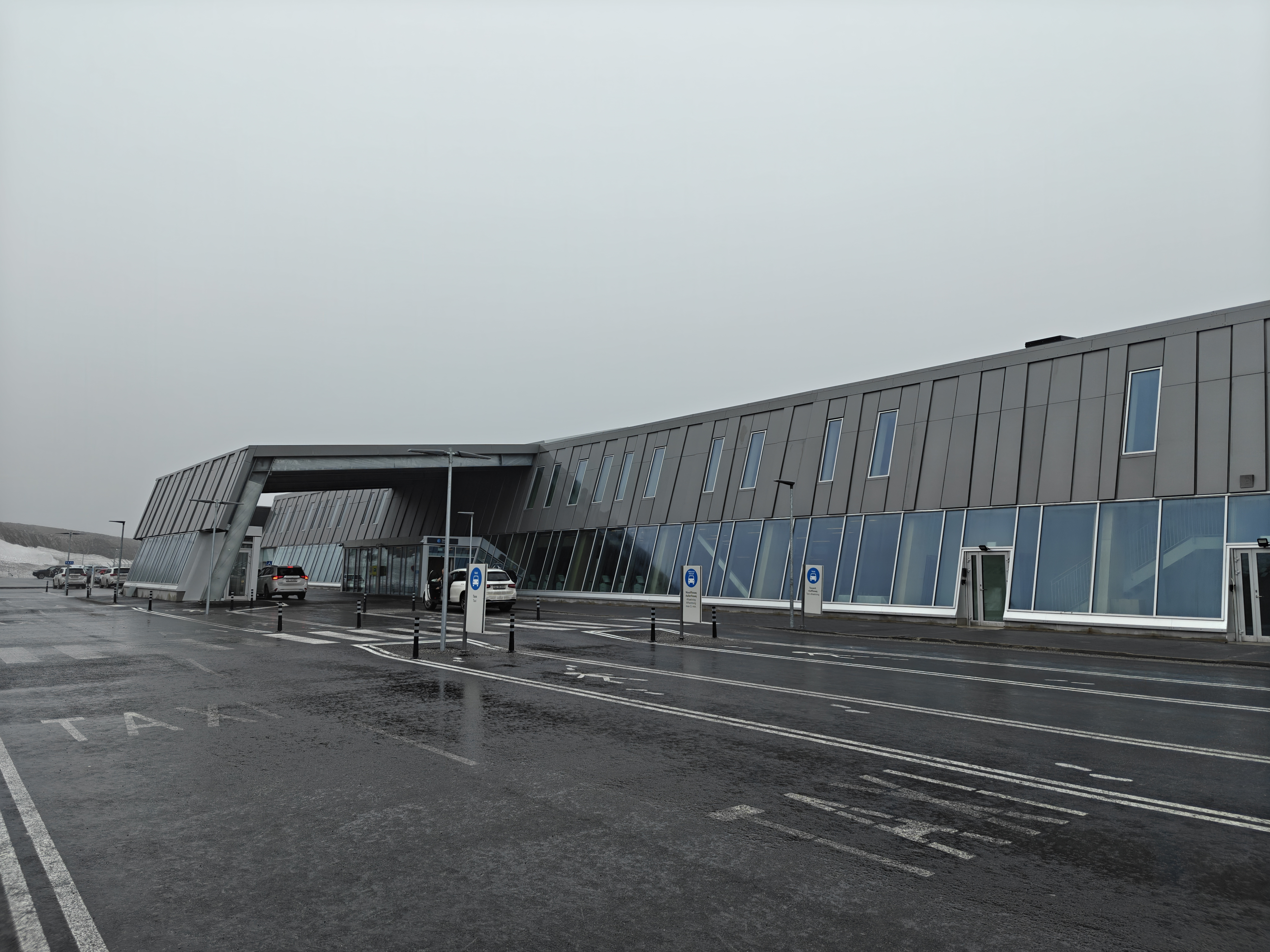
Nuuk Airport terminal, opened in 2024.

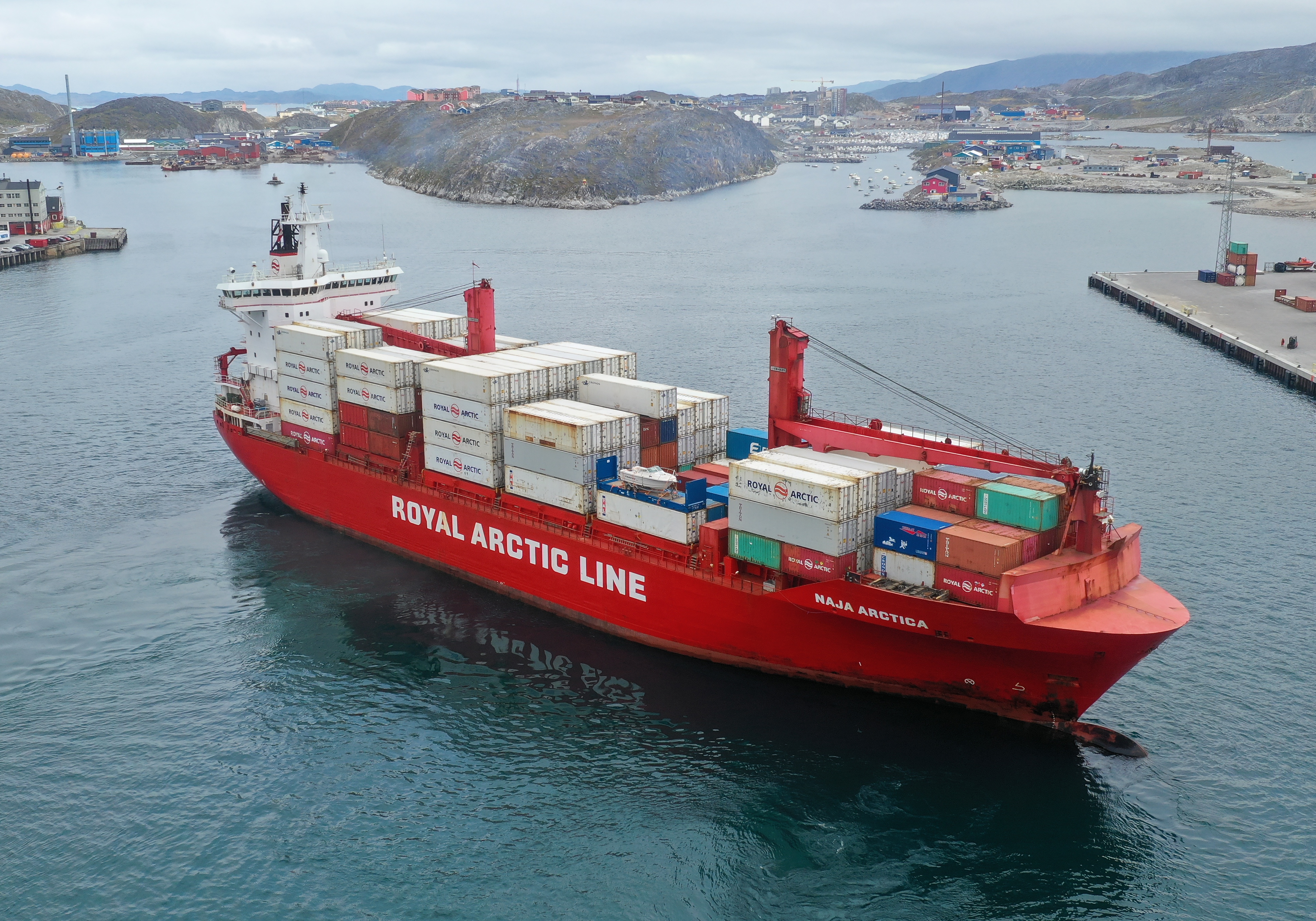
A Royal Arctic Line container ship in Nuuk

=== Airport ===
Nuuk has an international airport 4 km (2.5 mi) northeast of the town center. Built in 1979, it was extensively rebuilt and expanded in 2024 and is now Air Greenland's international and domestic hub and base of operations. Most traffic to, from, and within Greenland passes through the airport. It is served year-round with direct flights to Copenhagen and Reykjavík-Keflavík as well as almost all airports in Greenland. Seasonal routes are also operated to New York-Newark, Billund, Aalborg, and Iqaluit.

=== Sea ===
Nuuk is connected to Denmark by the Royal Arctic Line (in cooperation with Eimskip), which sails container ships from Aalborg via Iceland. They generally bring clothing, flour, medicine, timber, machinery, and non-perishable goods, and return with deep-frozen shrimp and fish. Most sea freight to other destinations in Greenland is trans-shipped in Nuuk via Royal Arctic Line.

Nuuk is served twice a week by the coastal passenger ferry of the Arctic Umiaq Line, which links the communities of the western coast, for most of the year.

=== Roads ===
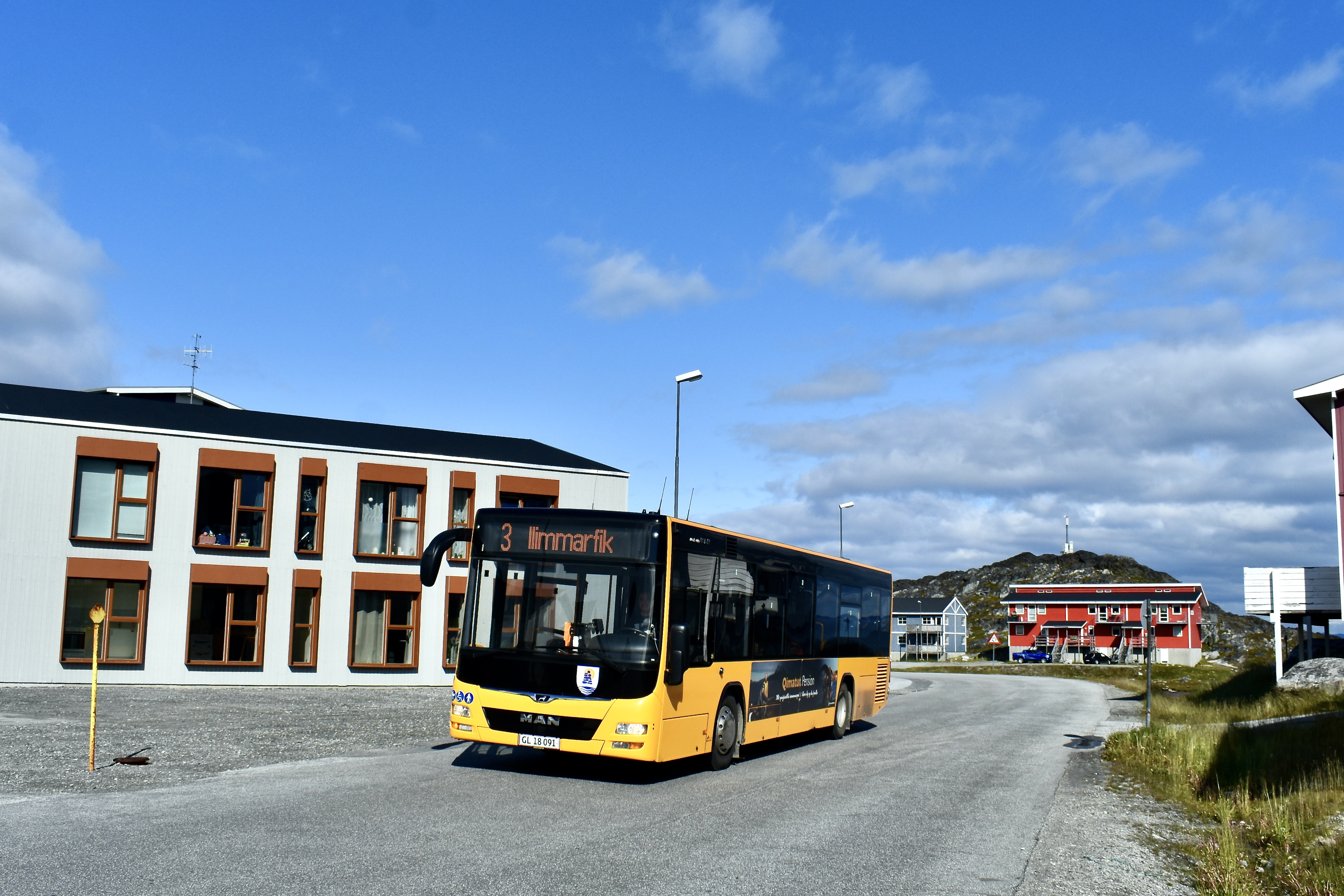
A bus in Nuuk

As of 2017, there are 80 km of local roads in Nuuk. No roads connect Nuuk with other parts of Greenland. Most buses and cars owned in Greenland operate in Nuuk. There are three traffic lights, 12 roundabouts, and one road tunnel in Nuuk, the only examples of such in Greenland. The city's high street is Aqqusinersuaq.

Since 1980, the bus service Nuup Bussii provides public transport services in Nuuk. Buses link the town center with the airport, the outlying districts and neighborhoods of Nuussuaq, Qinngorput, and Qernertunnguit in Quassussuup Tungaa. In 2012, the buses transported more than 2 million passengers around the city of Nuuk.

== Cityscape ==
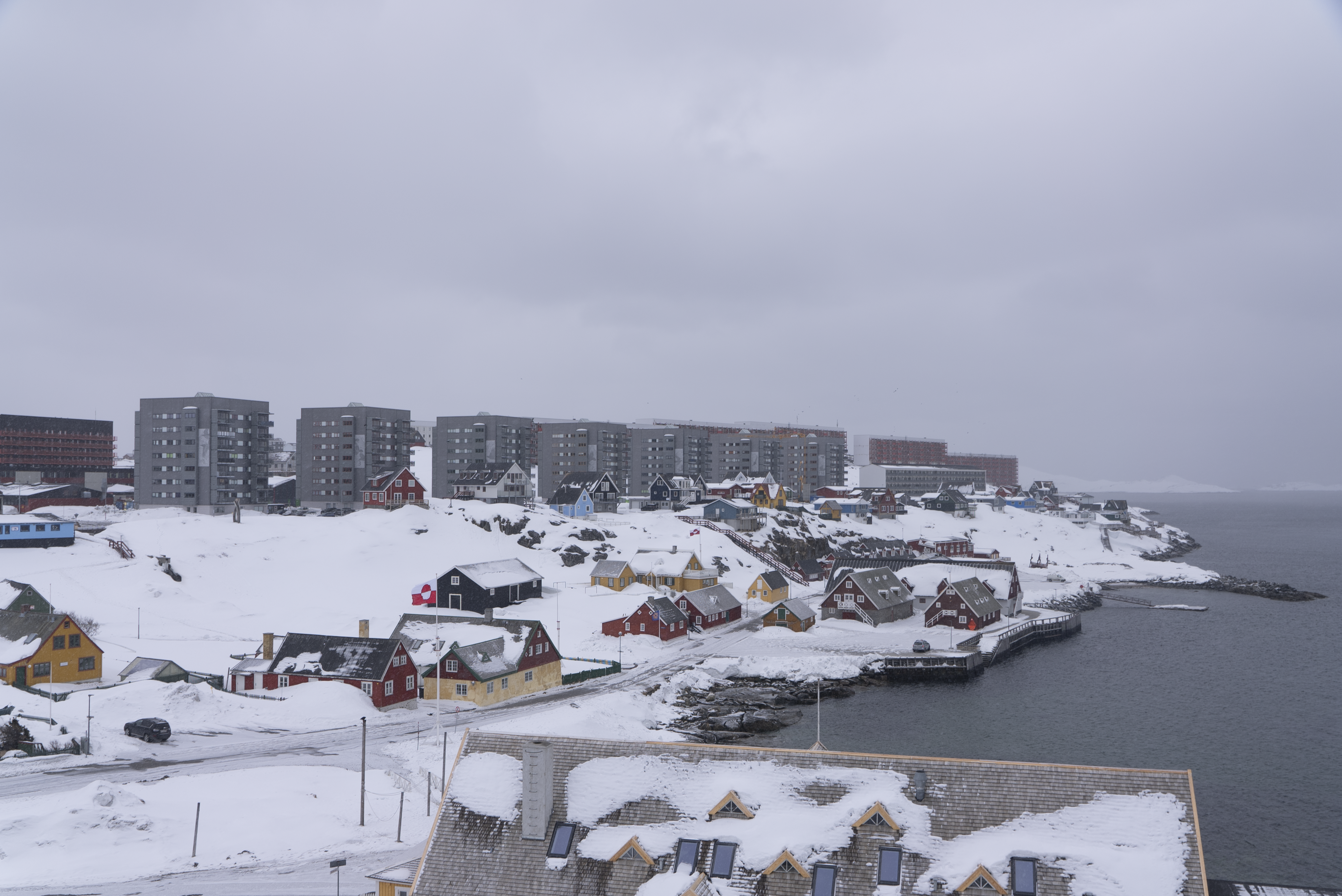
Tuapannguit low-rise residential buildings in Nuuk

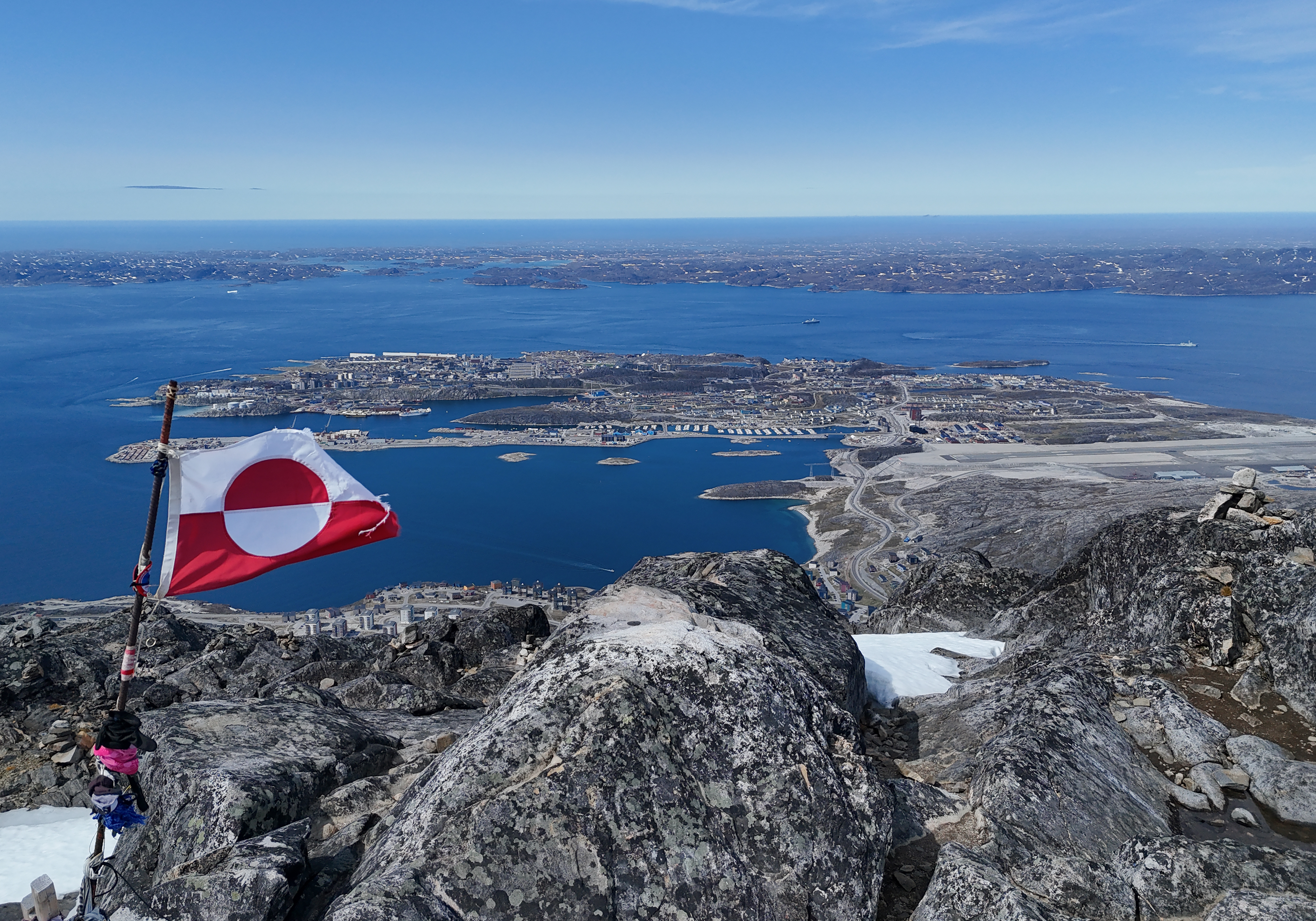
View of Nuuk from the top of Ukkusissat

=== Historical buildings ===
Hans Egede's House
Hans Egede's House, built in 1721 by the Norwegian missionary Hans Egede, is Greenland's oldest building. Standing close to the harbor among other old houses, it is now used for government receptions.

Nuuk Cathedral
The Church of Our Saviour of the Lutheran diocese of Greenland was built in 1849, and the tower was added in 1884. The red building with a clock tower and steeple is a prominent site on the landscape. The church received the status of Nuuk Cathedral in 1994. The first bishop was Kristian Mørk, followed in 1995 by Sofie Petersen, a Greenland native and the second woman in Denmark to become a bishop.

Outside the Cathedral stand the Statue of Hans Egede and the Statue of the Mother of the Sea, representing two different strands of Greenland's religious history.

The Herrnhut House was the center of the Moravian mission of New Herrnhut.

National Museum
Greenland National Museum is in Nuuk and was one of the first museums established in Greenland, inaugurated in the mid-1960s. It has many artifacts and exhibits related to Greenland's archaeology, history, art, and handicrafts, and contains the Qilakitsoq mummies.

Modern architecture

Examples of modern architecture include the Katuaq cultural center by Schmidt Hammer Lassen (1997), the campus of the University of Greenland by Tegnestuen Nuuk and KHR Arkitekter (2008), the Nuuk Center by KHR Arkitekter (2012), and the Anstalten Correctional Facility by Friis & Moltke and Schmidt Hammer Lassen (2019).

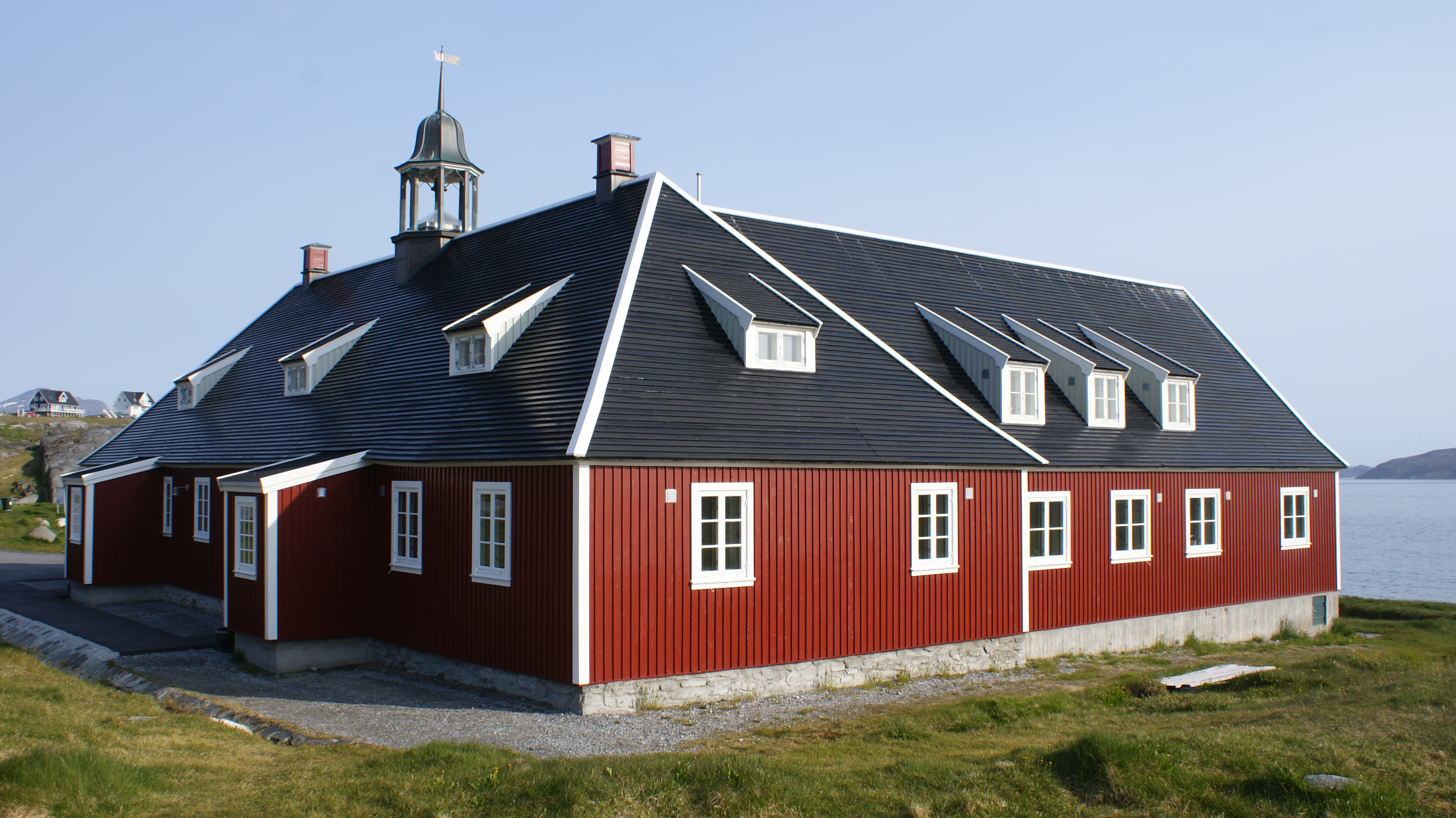
Moravian Brethren Mission House

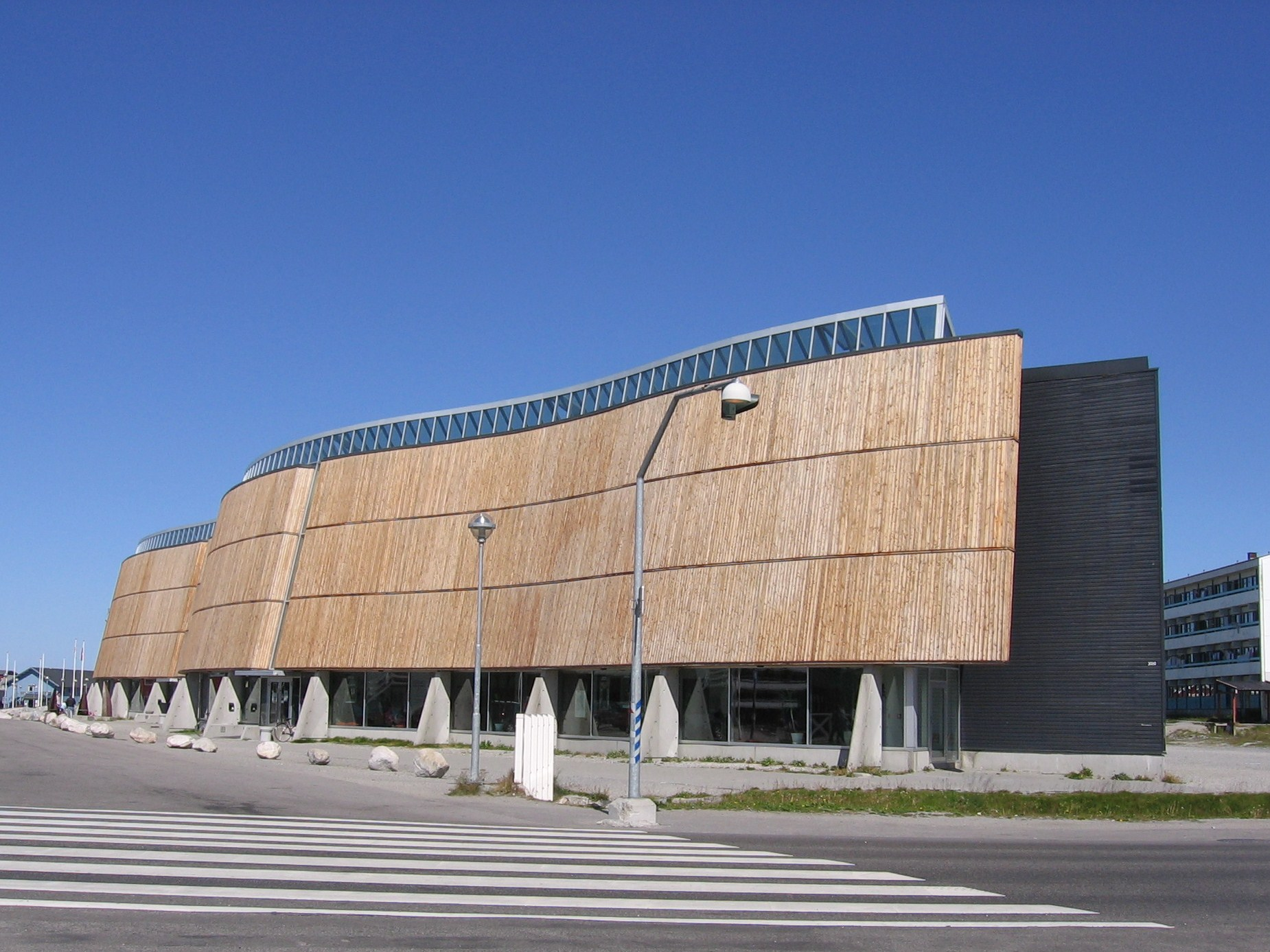
Katuaq

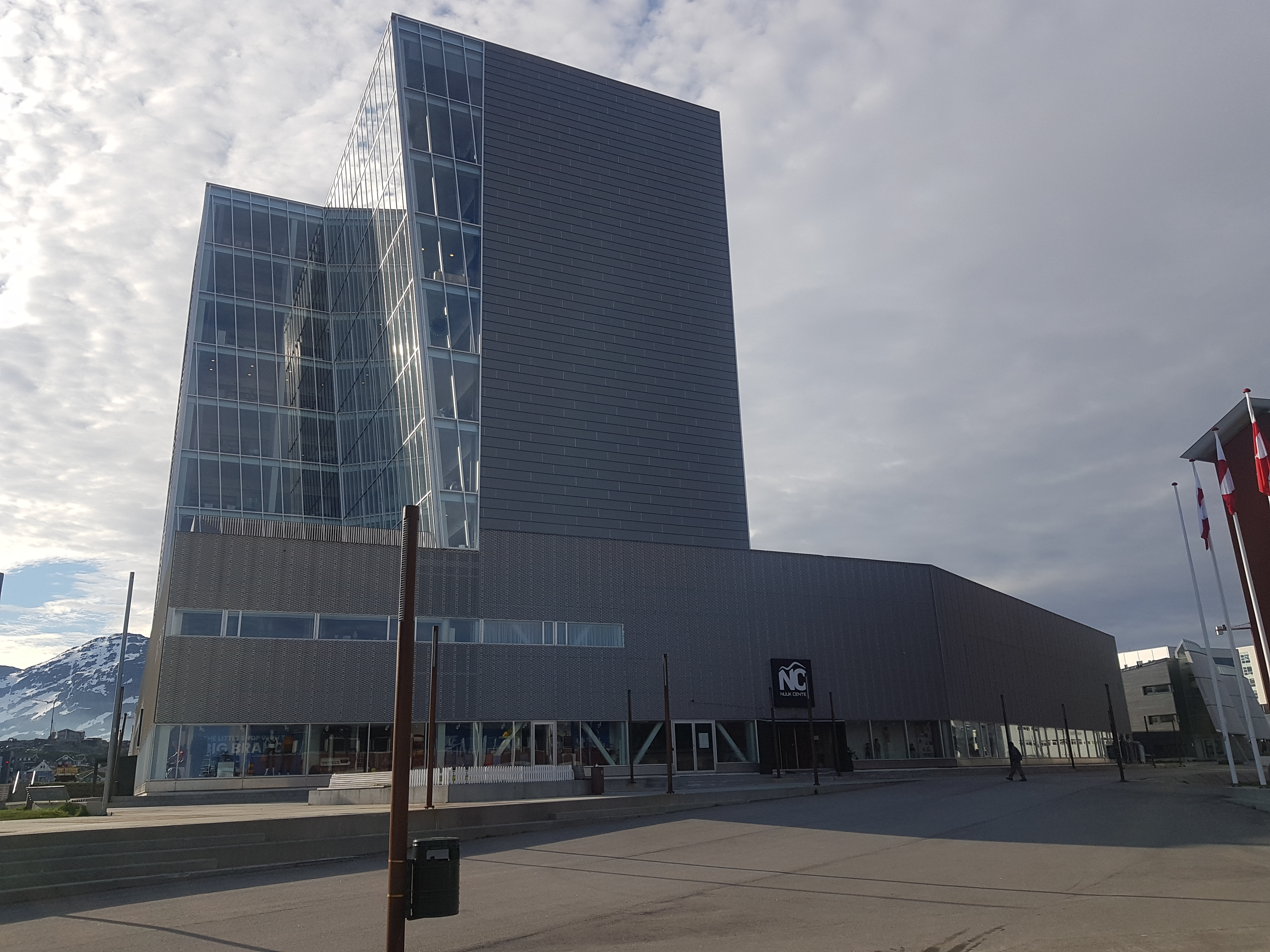
Nuuk Center

=== Cultural ===
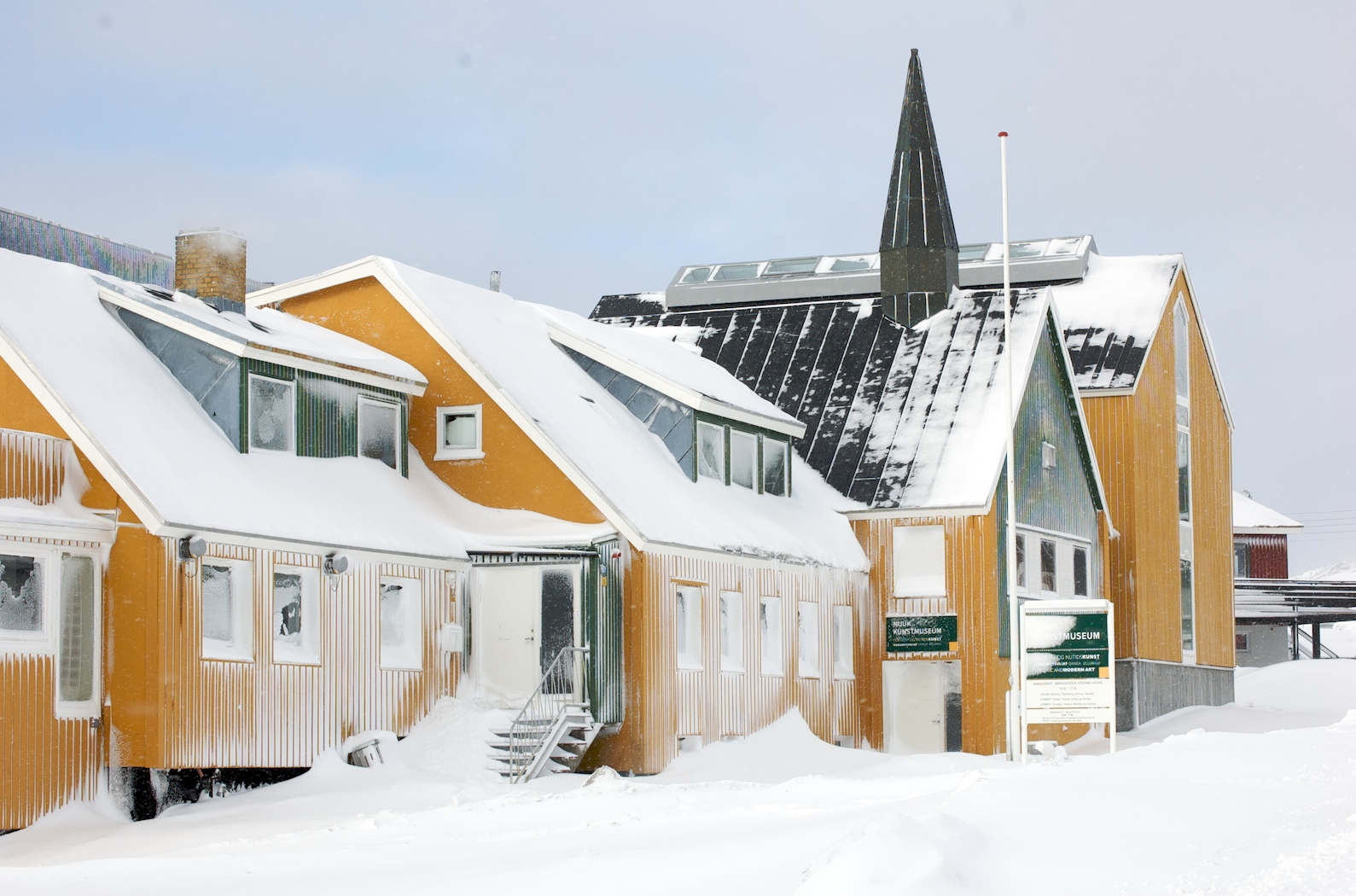
Nuuk Art Museum

Katuaq is a cultural center used for concerts, films, art exhibitions, and conferences. It was designed by Schmidt Hammer Lassen and inaugurated on 15 February 1997. Katuaq contains two auditoria, one seating 1,008 people and the other 508. The complex also contains an art school, library, meeting facilities, administrative offices, and a café.

The Nuuk Art Museum is Greenland's only private art and crafts museum. It has a notable collection of local paintings, watercolors, drawings, and graphics, some by Andy Warhol; and figures in soapstone, ivory, and wood, with many items collected by archaeologists.

=== Educational ===
Ilisimatusarfik, also known as the University of Greenland, is in Nuuk and is the national university of Greenland. Most courses are taught in Danish, although a few are in Kalaallisut. As of 2007, the university had about 150 students (almost all Greenlanders), 14 academic staff, and five administrators. Its library has about 30,000 volumes. The campus of the University of Greenland, hosting Statistics Greenland and the main holdings of the Public and National Library of Greenland, is at the district's northern end, near the road to Nuuk Airport.

The National Library of Greenland in Nuuk is the country's largest reference library. It is devoted to preserving Greenland's cultural heritage and history. The library holdings are split between the public library in the town center and Ilimmarfik, the campus of the University of Greenland. As of 1 January 2008, there are 83,324 items in the library database at Ilimmarfik.

== Sports ==
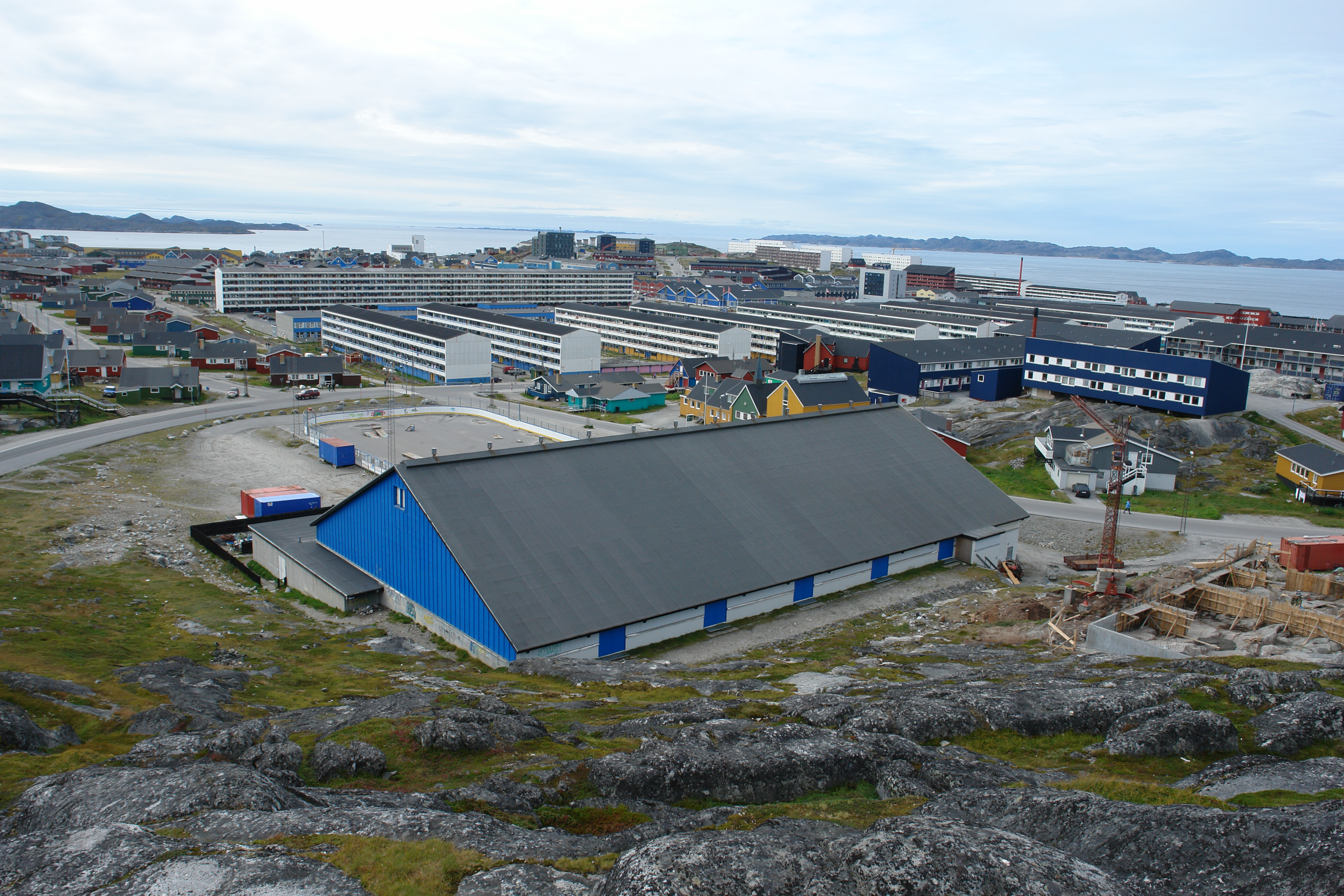
Godthåbhallen exterior

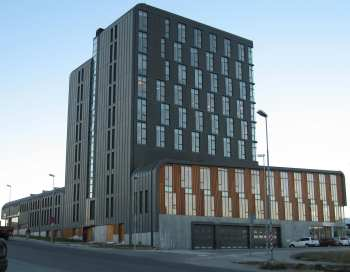
Teletårnet, Nuuk

Nuuk's sports clubs include Nuuk IL (established in 1934), B-67, and GSS Nuuk. Nuuk Stadium is a multi-purpose stadium, used mostly for football games. The stadium has a capacity of 2,000. The stadium can also be used as an entertainment venue: the Scottish rock band Nazareth performed at the venue.

Nuuk also has the Godthåbhallen, a handball stadium. It is the home of the Greenland men's national handball team and has a capacity of 1,000. There is a hill for alpine skiing with an altitude difference around 300 meters on the mountain Lille Malene, with the valley station close to the airport terminal. There is also the Nuuk golf course, the only arctic golf course in the world.

An indoor sports centre, Inussivik, was opened in 2002.

== Notable people ==
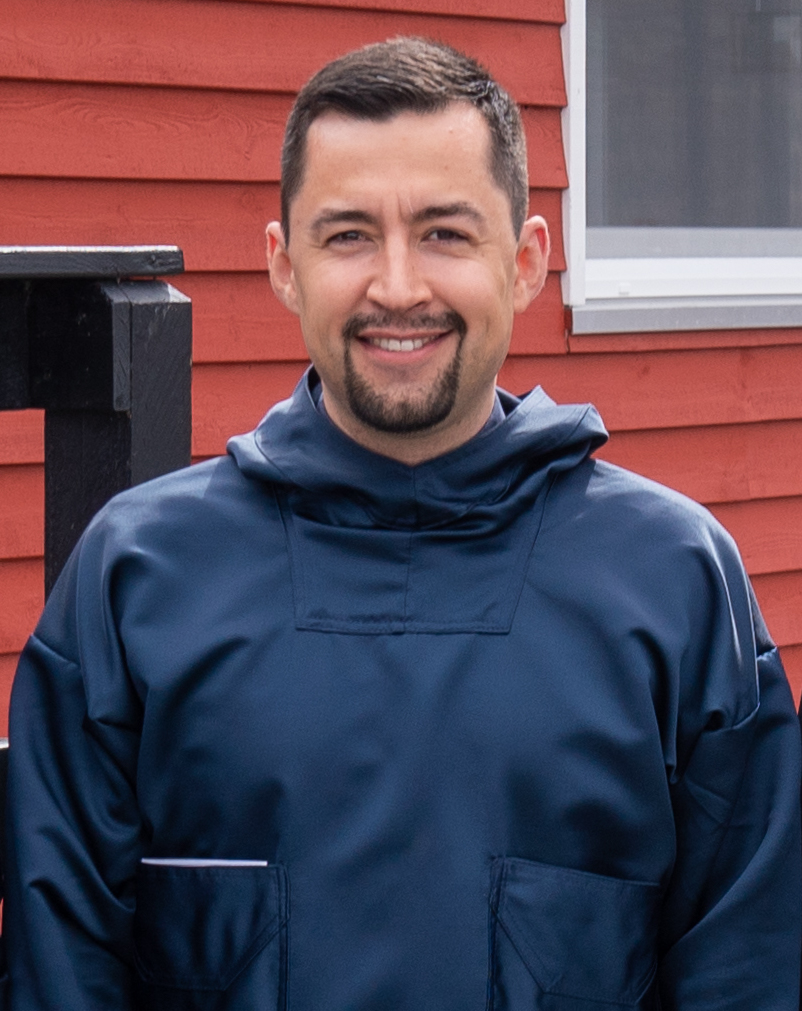
Múte Bourup Egede, 2021

- Johan Carl Christian Petersen (1813–1880), a seaman and interpreter
- Hans Lynge (1906–1988), writer, dramatist, painter, politician, printmaker and sculptor
- Finn Lynge (1933–2014), politician, Indigenous rights activist and priest; the sole MEP for Greenland, 1979 until 1984
- Agnethe Davidsen (1947–2007), Greenland's first female government minister
- Rasmus Lyberth (born 1951), musician and actor
- Sofie Petersen (born 1955), a Lutheran bishop & Bishop of Greenland from 1995 to 2020
- Minik Thorleif Rosing (born 1957), geologist
- Bo Lidegaard (born 1958), historian and journalist
- brothers Otto Rosing (born 1967), film director & Lars Rosing (born 1972), actor
- Maliina Abelsen (born 1976), Greenland's Minister for Social Affairs
- Aaja Chemnitz (born 1977), politician, member of the Danish Folketing
- Sara Olsvig (born 1978), politician member of the Danish Folketing, 2011–2014
- Nive Nielsen (born 1979), singer-songwriter and actress
- Julie Berthelsen (born 1979), pop singer and songwriter
- Bibi Chemnitz (born 1983), fashion designer
- Múte Bourup Egede (born 1987), politician, seventh Prime Minister of Greenland

=== Sport ===
- Nils Nielsen (born 1971), football manager, head coach for the Switzerland women's national football team, 2018–2022
- Jesper Grønkjær (born 1977), footballer, played 400 games and 80 for Denmark
- Mads Andersen (born 1995), a Danish chess grandmaster

== International relations ==
=== Twin towns and sister cities ===
Nuuk is twinned with:

- Aalborg, Denmark (2002–present)
- Changchun, Jilin, China
- Tiverton, Rhode Island, United States
- Lyngby-Taarbæk, Denmark
- Huddinge, Sweden
- Reykjavík, Iceland
- Ushuaia, Argentina
- Bocas Town, Panama
- Sorong, Indonesia
- Stockholm, Sweden

== See also ==
- Coat of Arms of Nuuk
- Sisimiut, the second-largest city in Greenland
