= Qeqertarsuaq Island (Nuuk) =

Island in Sermersooq, Greenland

Qeqertarsuaq
Storø
- Location within Greenland

Geography
- Location: Nuup Kangerlua
- Coordinates: 64°24′N 51°04′W

Administration
- Greenland
- Municipality: Sermersooq

Qeqertarsuaq, meaning 'The Large Island' in the Greenlandic language (Danish: Storø meaning 'big island' as well), is an uninhabited island in the Sermersooq municipality in southwestern Greenland.

== Geography ==
Qeqertarsuaq is one of three mountainous islands located in the middle run of the 160 km (99.4 mi) long Nuup Kangerlua fjord, to the north of Nuuk, the capital of Greenland. Its highest mountain is 1,616 metres (5,302 ft) high, meaning it is an ultra prominent mountain.

The two sibling islands are Qoornuup Qeqertarsua Island and Sermitsiaq Island.

== See also ==
- List of islands of Greenland
- Storø, another Greenlandic island located on the east coast.
- Disko Island, in Greenlandic Qeqertarsuaq, located in Disko Bay.
