= Sermitsiaq Island =

Uninhabited island in southwestern Greenland

Sermitsiaq
Sadelø
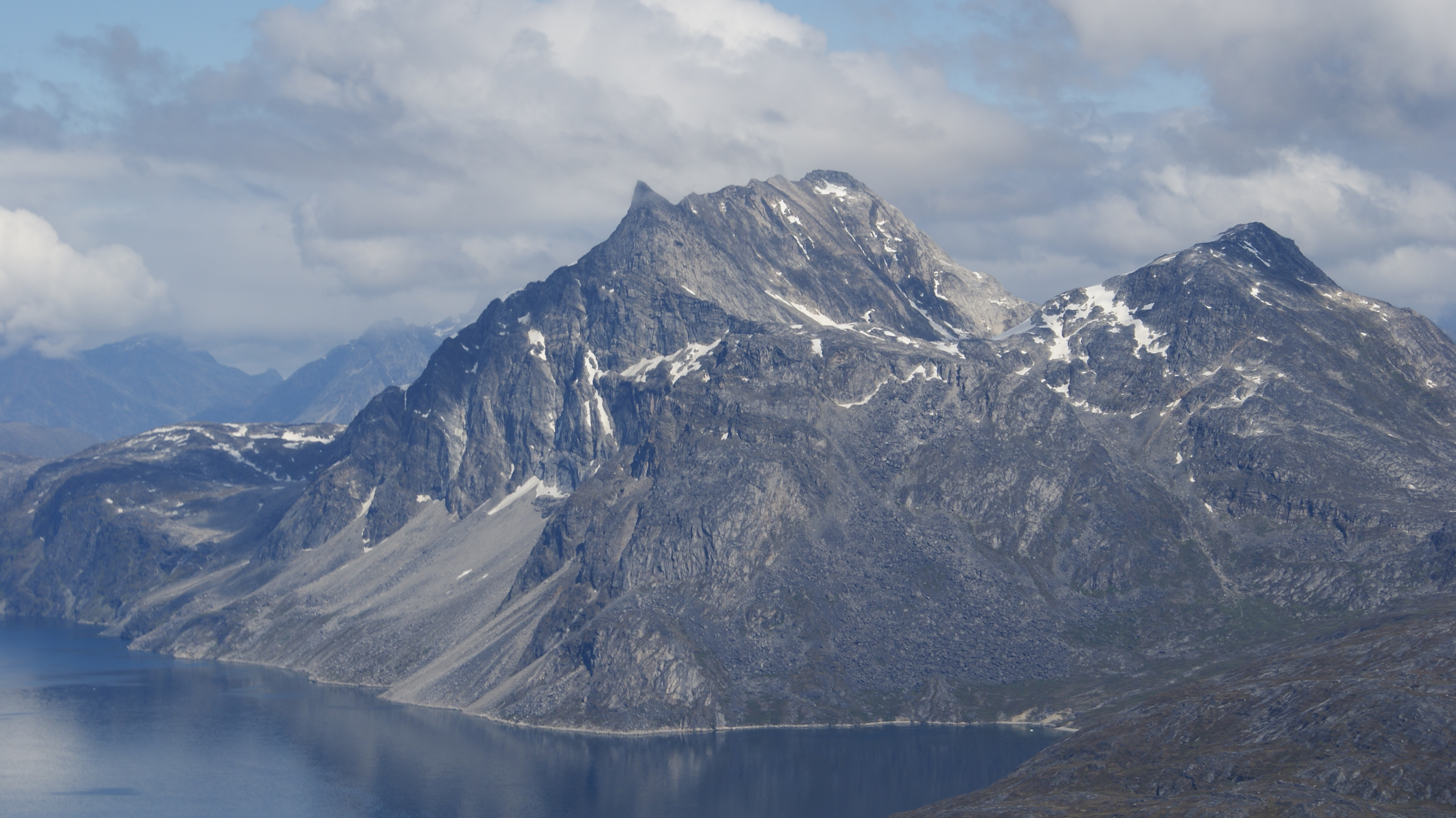
- Aerial view of Sermitsiaq from the southwest

- Location within Greenland

Geography
- Location: Nuup Kangerlua
- Coordinates: 64°18′N 51°27′W

Administration
- Greenland
- Municipality: Sermersooq

Sermitsiaq Island (Danish: Sadelø) is an uninhabited island in the Sermersooq municipality in southwestern Greenland.

== Geography ==
Sermitsiaq is one of three mountainous islands located in the middle section of the 160 km (99.4 mi) long Nuup Kangerlua fjord, to the north of Nuuk, the capital of Greenland. The two sibling islands are Qeqertarsuaq Island and Qoornuup Qeqertarsua Island. The prominent 1,210 metres (3,970 ft) Sermitsiaq mountain topping the island is a landmark of Nuuk, visible from most places in the city.

== See also ==
- List of islands of Greenland
