= Sermitsiaq (newspaper) =

Greenlandic newspaper

Sermitsiaq is one of two national newspapers in Greenland. It is named after the mountain Sermitsiaq that is visible in Nuuk.

The newspaper was published for the first time May 21, 1958, as a Kalaallisut-language alternative to the Danish-language newspaper Mikken. The two magazines were printed separately, with Mikken on Saturdays and Sermitsiaq on Mondays for about six months, until Mikken was published for the last time on 22 November the same year. Sermitsiaq was first printed in both Danish and Kalaallisut the week before Mikken closed down.

Sermitsiaq was a local newspaper distributed only in Nuuk (Godthåb) city until around 1980 when the newspaper became national. The newspaper became increasingly political in the period around 1980, since Greenland was granted home rule in 1979.

The newspaper is published every Friday, while the online version is updated several times daily.

In 2010 Sermitsiaq merged with Atuagagdliutit/Grønlandsposten (AG), the other Greenlandic newspaper. Both papers' websites now redirect to the combined Sermitsiaq.com website.
