= Qoornuup Qeqertarsua Island =

Island in Sermersooq, Greenland

Qoornup Qeqertarsua
Bjørneøen
- Location within Greenland

Geography
- Location: Nuup Kangerlua
- Coordinates: 64°27′N 51°17′W

Administration
- Greenland
- Municipality: Sermersooq

Qoornup Qeqertarsua Island (Danish: Bjørneøen) is an uninhabited island in the Sermersooq municipality in southwestern Greenland.

== Geography ==
Qoornup Qeqertarsua is one of three mountainous islands located in the middle run of the 160-kilometre-long (99.4 mi) Nuup Kangerlua fjord, to the north of Nuuk, the capital of Greenland. It has a 1,256-metre-high (4,121 ft) mountain. The two sibling islands are Qeqertarsuaq Island and Sermitsiaq Island.

== See also ==
- List of islands of Greenland
