= Nuup Kangerlua =

Fjord in Greenland

- Godthåbsfjord; Gilbert Sound
- Location in Greenland
- Location: Arctic
- Coordinates: 64°30′N 51°23′W
- Ocean/sea sources: Labrador Sea
- Basin countries: Greenland
- Max. length: 160 km (99 mi)
- Max. width: 7 km (4.3 mi)

Nuup Kangerlua is a 160 km (99.4 mi) long fjord in the Sermersooq municipality in southwestern Greenland. It was formerly known by its colonial name as Godthaab Fjord (Danish: Godthåbsfjorden), Gilbert Sound and Baal's River.

Located by the island's capital, Nuuk, it is the longest fjord on the Labrador Sea coast of Greenland, and one of the longest in the inhabited part of the country.

== Geography ==
The fjord head is located deep inland, with the fjord beginning as an icefjord at 64°19′50″N 49°36′10″W, with two glaciers draining the Greenland ice sheet (Greenlandic: Sermersuaq) flowing into the fjord.

Initially, the fjord flows to the northwest, to then turn southwest at 64°43′N 50°37′W, splitting into three arms in its lower run, with three large, mountainous islands in between the arms: Sermitsiaq Island with the Sermitsiaq mountain visible from most of Nuuk, Qeqertarsuaq Island, and Qoornuup Qeqertarsua Island.

The fjord widens into a bay dotted with skerries near its mouth, opening into Labrador Sea at approximately 64°03′N 51°58′W, near the former Kangeq settlement.

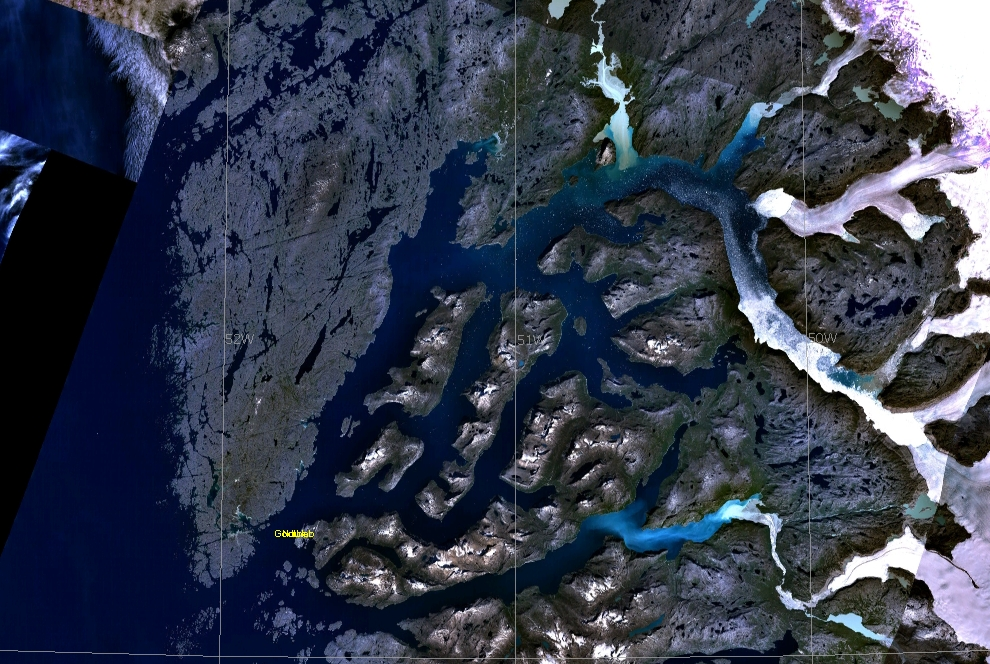
Satellite view of Nuup Kangerlua

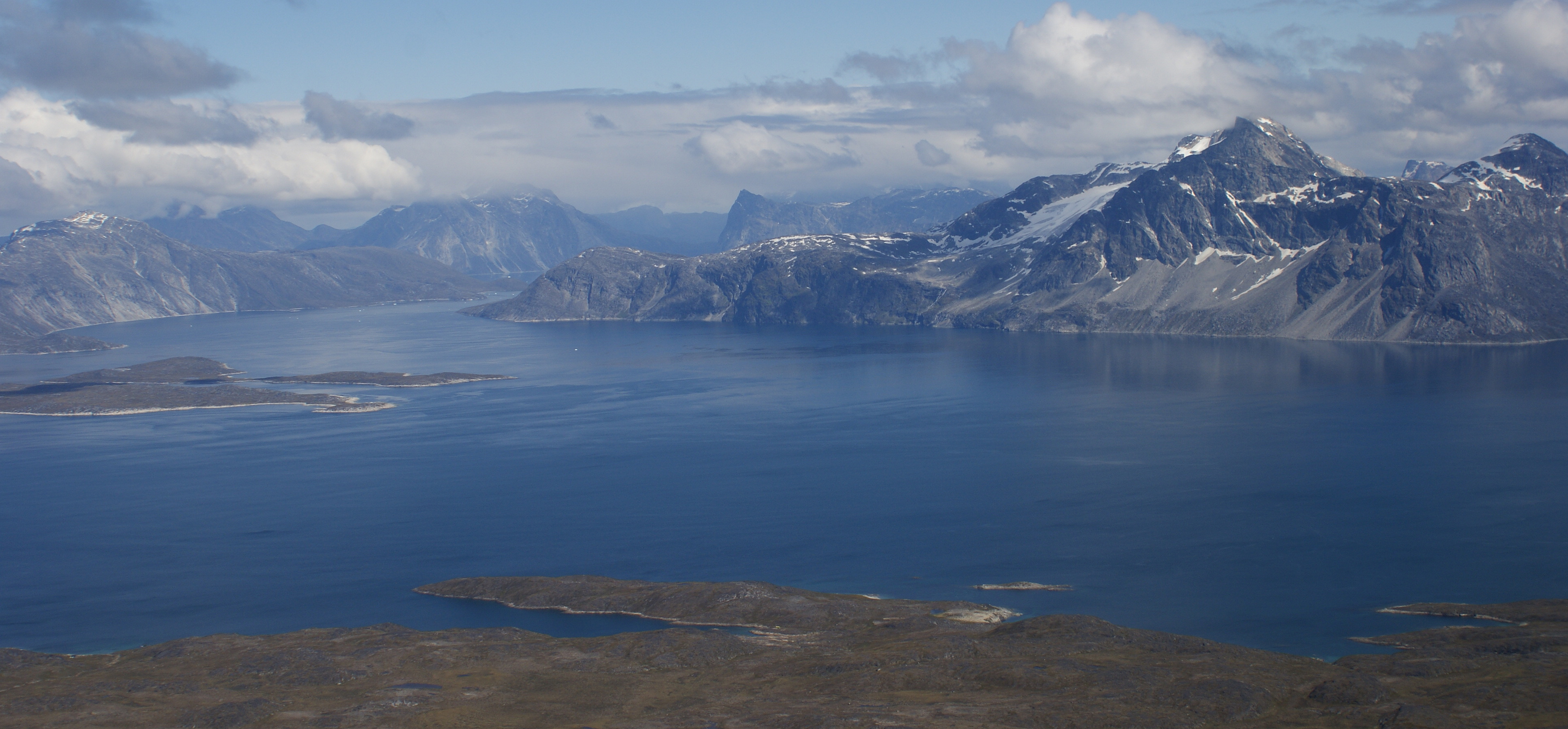
Aerial view of the fjord and Sermitsiaq mountain

=== Settlement ===
Nuuk, the capital of Greenland, is located near the mouth of the fjord, on a mountainous peninsula bounding the fjord from the southeast. Kapisillit (Lakskaj) is located 75 km (47 mi) northeast of Nuuk, near the head of Kapisillit Kangerluaq, one of the tributary fjords of Nuup Kangerlua.

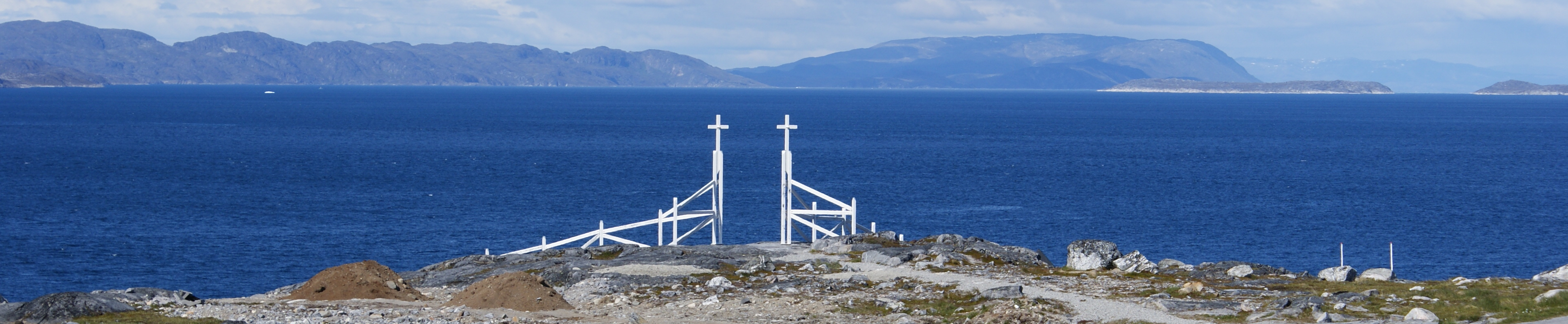
Nuup Kangerlua seen from the outskirts of the Nuussuaq district of Nuuk.

== See also ==
- List of fjords of Greenland
