= Sermitsiaq (mountain) =

Mountain in Greenland

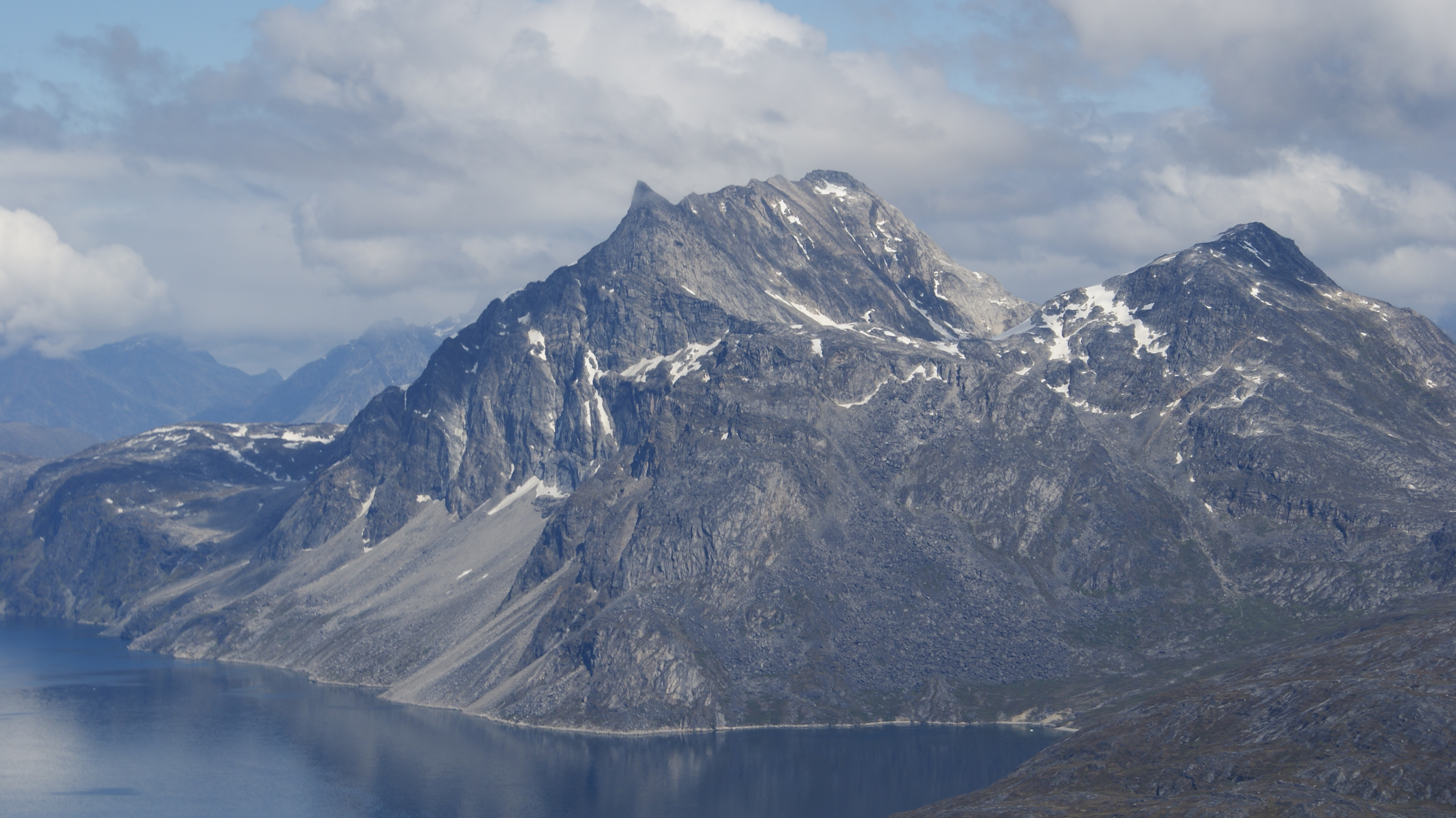
- Aerial view of Sermitsiaq from the southwest

Highest point
- Elevation: 1,210 m (3,970 ft)
- Listing: List of mountains in Greenland
- Coordinates: 64°18′N 51°30′W

Geography
- Location within Greenland
- Location: Sermersooq, Greenland

Sermitsiaq (Danish: Sadelø, lit. 'saddle') is a 1,210-metre-tall (3,970 ft) Greenlandic mountain in the district of Nuuk in Sermersooq Municipality.

== Location ==
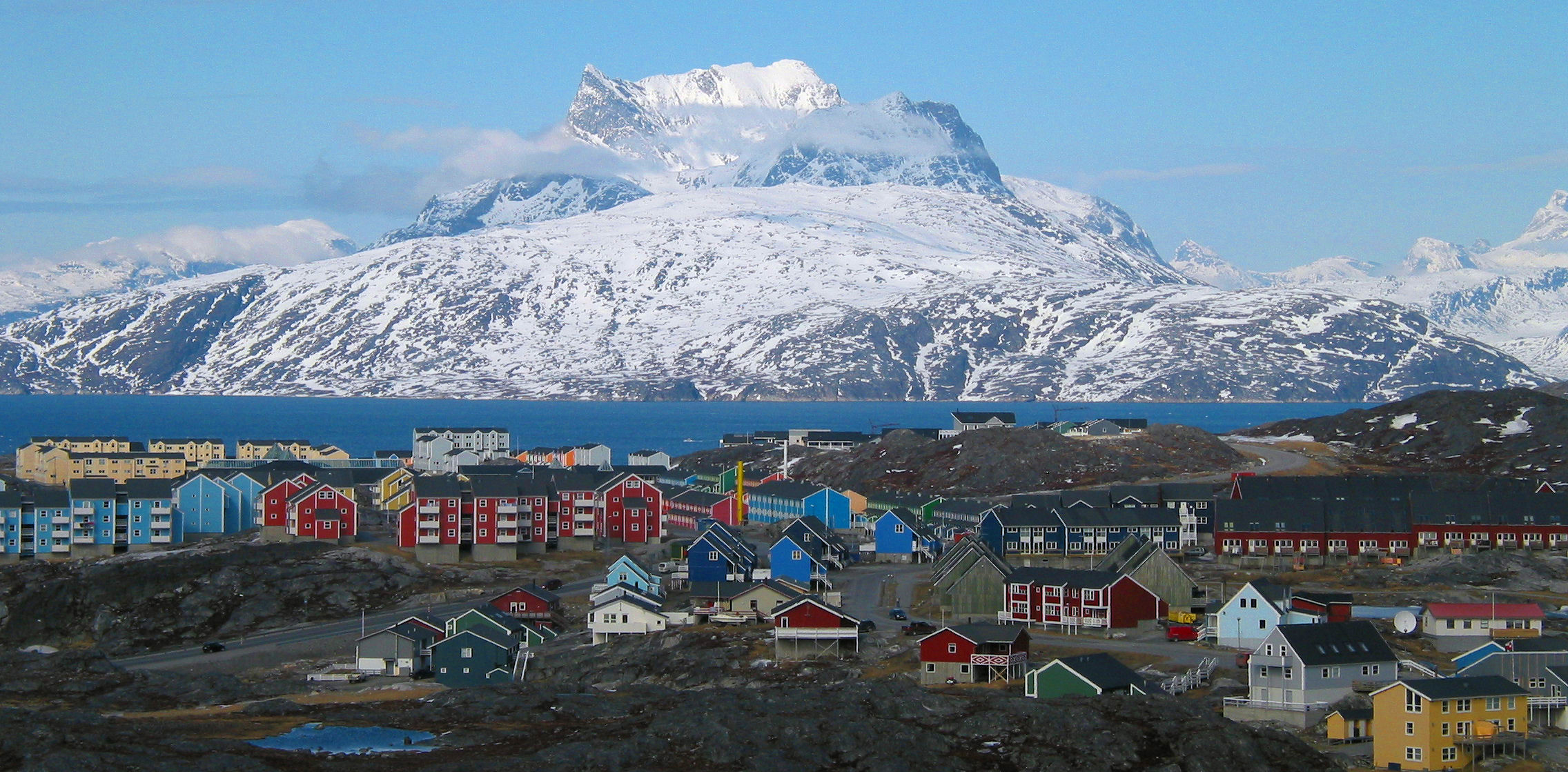
The city of Nuuk below Sermitsiaq

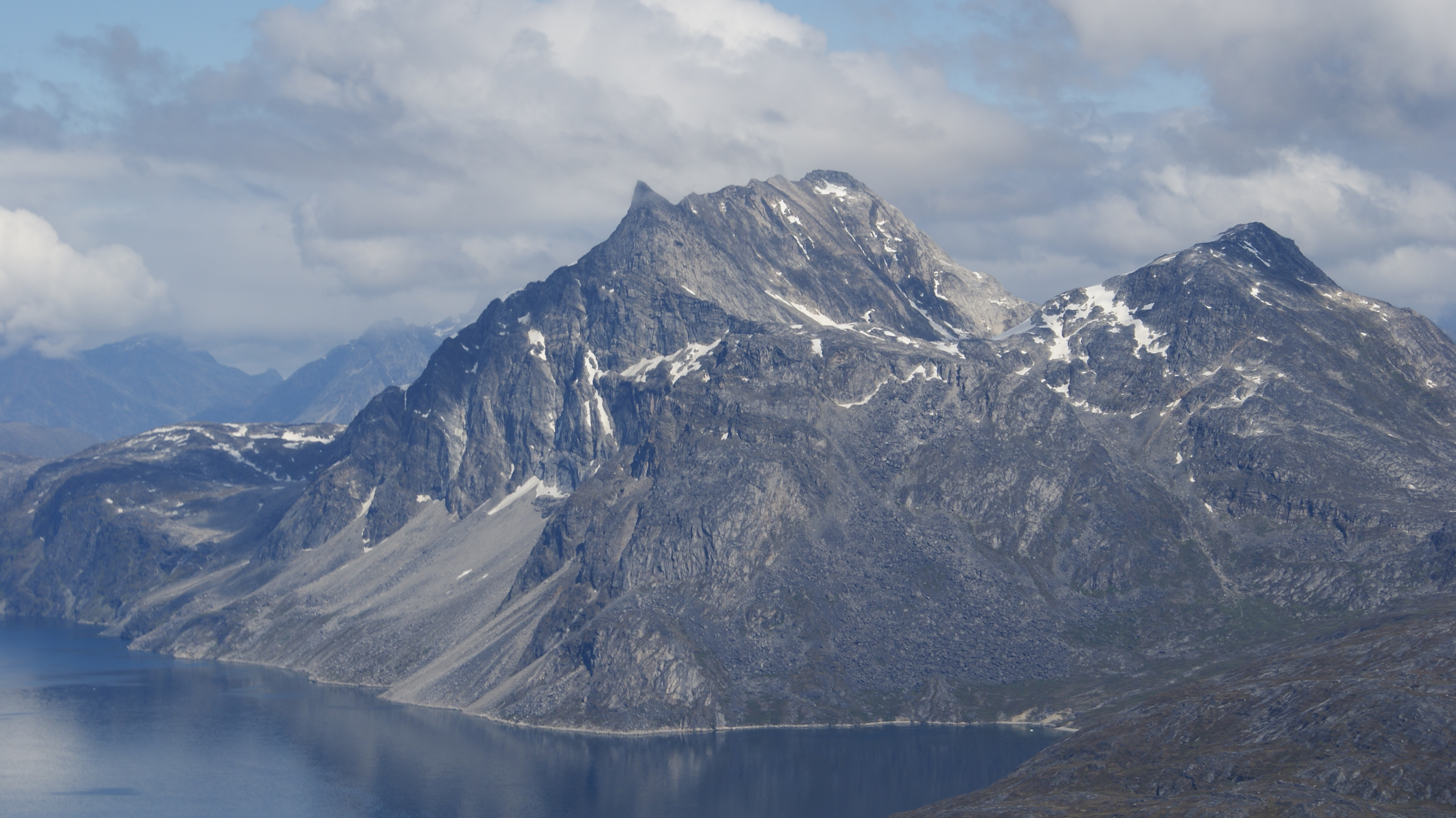
Sermitsiaq seen from the west

The mountain is located in the center of its namesake island and 15 km northeast of Nuuk, the capital of Greenland, in the fjord Nuup Kangerlua (Danish: Godthåbsfjorden). Its summit is crowned by a sharp west–east ridge, from which three summit points emerge. These resemble a saddle, which gave the mountain and the island its Danish name. Its south side is shaped by steep rock formations, and its north side is covered with glaciers. It also has a waterfall, which is a tourist attraction.

Due to its distinctive shape, the mountain is Nuuk's most prominent landmark, incorporated into its flag and coat of arms. Sermitsiaq, one of two national newspapers in Greenland, is named after the mountain.

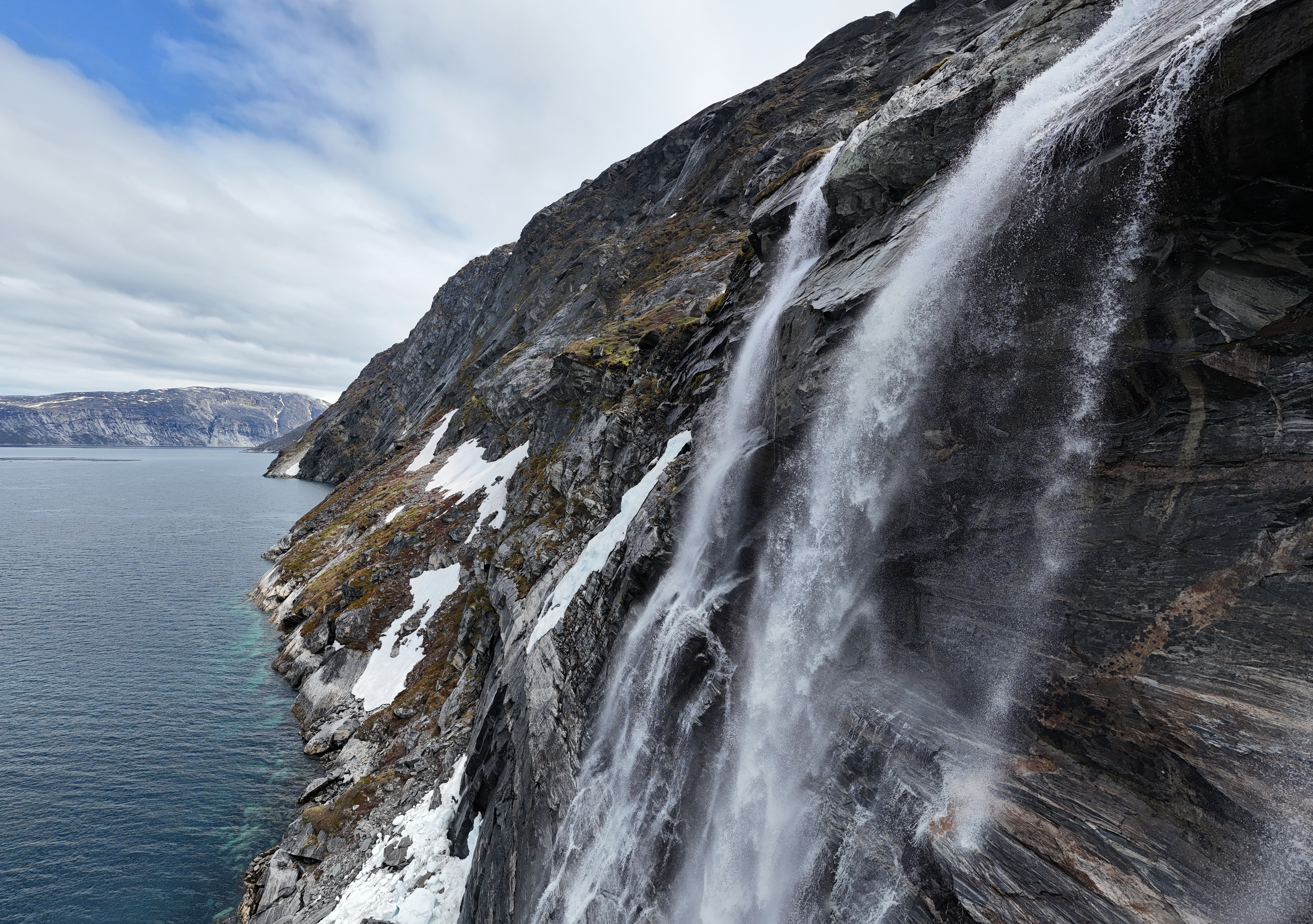
Meltwater waterfall on the backside of Sermitsiaq

== See also ==
- List of mountains in Greenland
