= List of companies of Greenland =

Location of Greenland

Greenland is an autonomous constituent country of the Kingdom of Denmark between the Arctic and Atlantic Oceans, east of the Canadian Arctic Archipelago. Though physiographically a part of the continent of North America, Greenland has been politically and culturally associated with Europe (specifically Norway and Denmark, the colonial powers, as well as the nearby island of Iceland) for more than a millennium.

In 1979, Denmark had granted home rule to Greenland, and in 2008, Greenlanders voted in favour of the Self-Government Act, which transferred more power from the Kingdom Government (Regeringen) to the local Self-rule Government (Naalakkersuisut). Under the new structure, in effect since 21 June 2009, Greenland can gradually assume responsibility for policing, judicial system, company law, accounting, and auditing; mineral resource activities; aviation; law of legal capacity, family law and succession law; aliens and border controls; the working environment; and financial regulation and supervision, while the Kingdom Government retains control of foreign affairs and defence. It also retains control of monetary policy, providing an initial annual subsidy of DKK 3.4 billion, which is planned to diminish gradually over time. Greenland expects to grow its economy based on increased income from the extraction of natural resources. The capital, Nuuk, held the 2016 Arctic Winter Games. Greenland leads the world in renewable energy. 70% of its energy is from renewable sources, particularly hydropower.

== Notable firms ==
This list includes notable companies with primary headquarters located in the country. The industry and sector follow the Industry Classification Benchmark taxonomy. Organizations which have ceased operations are included and noted as defunct.

Notable companies Status: P=Private, S=State; A=Active, D=Defunct
Name	Industry	Sector	Headquarters	Founded	Notes	Status	
Air Greenland	Consumer services	Airlines	Nuuk	1960	Airline	S	A
Arctic Umiaq Line	Industrials	Marine transportation	Nuuk	2006	Shipping	P	A
Atuagkat Bookstore	Consumer services	Specialty retailers	Nuuk	1976	Bookstore	P	A
Bank of Greenland	Financials	Banks	Nuuk	1967	Commercial bank	P	A
Brugseni	Consumer services	Food retailers & wholesalers	Nuuk	1963	Supermarket chain	P	A
Diskoline	Industrials	Marine transportation	Ilulissat	2004	Freight	P	A
Great Greenland Furhouse	Consumer goods	Clothing & accessories	Qaqortoq	1985	Fur, fashion	P	A
Greenland Airport Authority	Consumer services	Airlines	Nuuk	1988	Airport	P	A
Greenland Brewhouse	Consumer goods	Brewers	Narsaq	2004	Brewery	P	A
Kalaallit Nunaata Radioa	Consumer services	Broadcasting & entertainment	Nuuk	1958	State broadcaster	S	A
KNI A/S	Consumer services	Broadline retailers	Sisimiut	1992	Trading firm	S	A
Nukissiorfiit	Utilities	Alternative electricity	Nuuk	1949	State electrical	S	A
Nunaoil	Oil & gas	Exploration & production	Nuuk	1985	Petroleum/natural gas	P	A
Nuuk TV	Consumer services	Broadcasting & entertainment	Nuuk	2002	Television broadcaster	P	A
Nuup Bussii	Consumer services	Travel & tourism	Nuuk	1980	Bus	P	A
Pilersuisoq	Consumer services	Broadline retailers	Sisimiut	1992	General purpose stores	P	A
Pisiffik	Consumer services	Broadline retailers	Sisimiut	2001	General stores	P	A
Post Greenland	Industrials	Delivery services	Nuuk	1925	Postal service	P	A
Royal Arctic Line	Industrials	Delivery services	Nuuk	1993	Freight	P	A
Royal Greenland	Consumer goods	Farming & fishing	Nuuk	1990	Fishing	P	A
Sermitsiaq	Consumer services	Publishing	Nuuk	1958	Newspaper	P	A
TELE Greenland	Telecommunications	Fixed line telecommunications	Nuuk	1997	Telecom, broadcaster	P	A

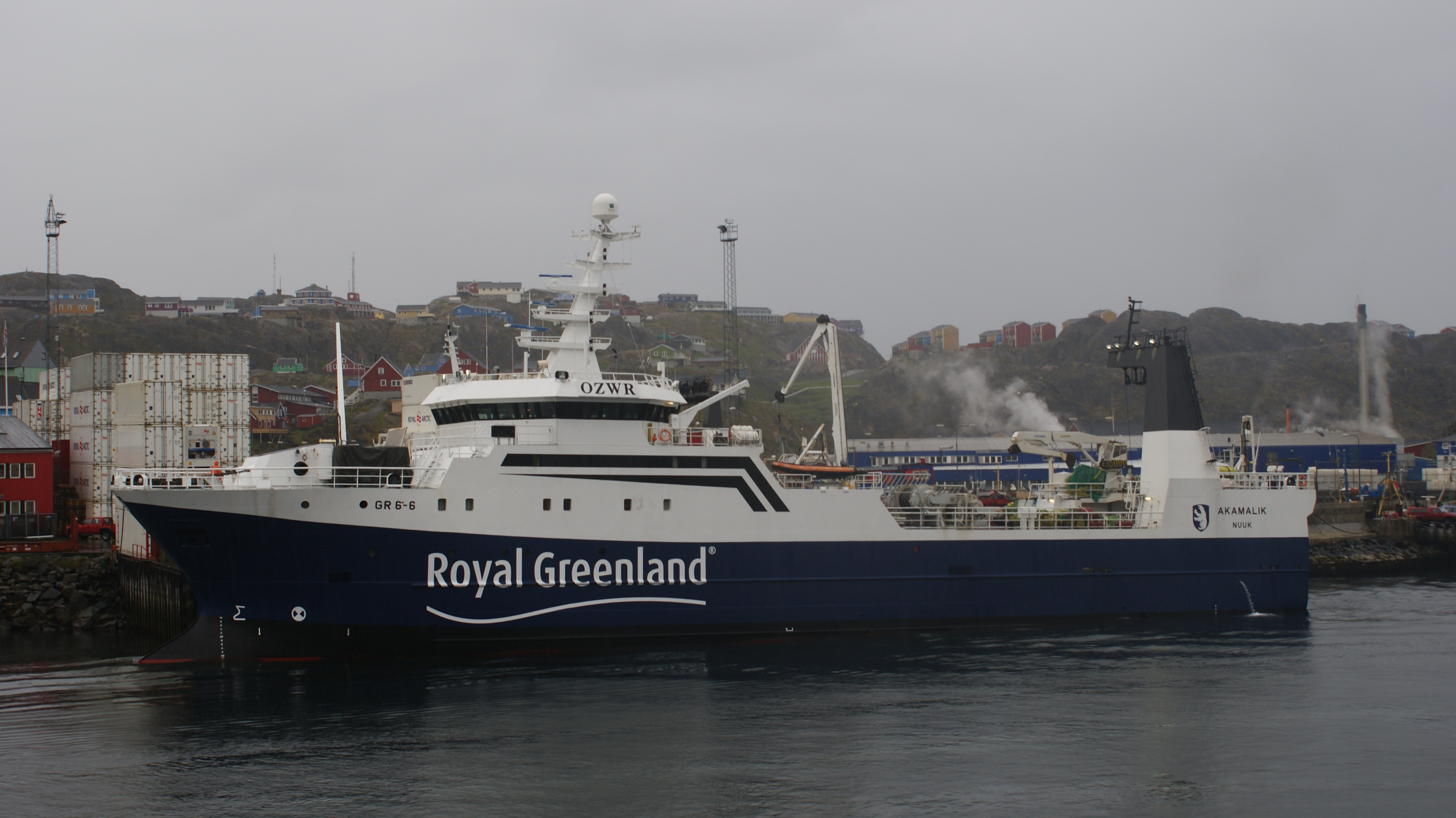
Royal Greenland fishing vessel at Sisimiut port.

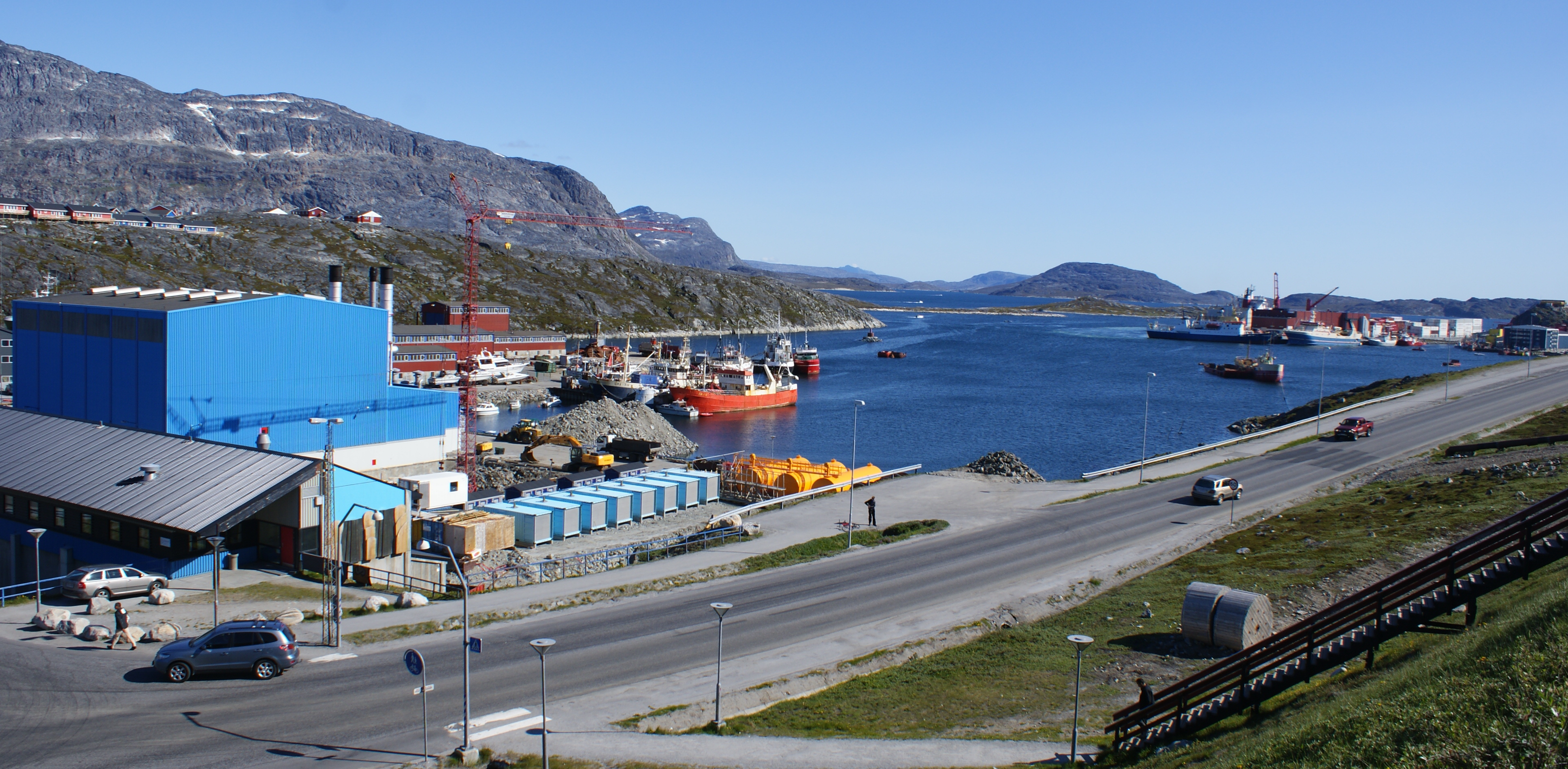
The port of Nuuk.

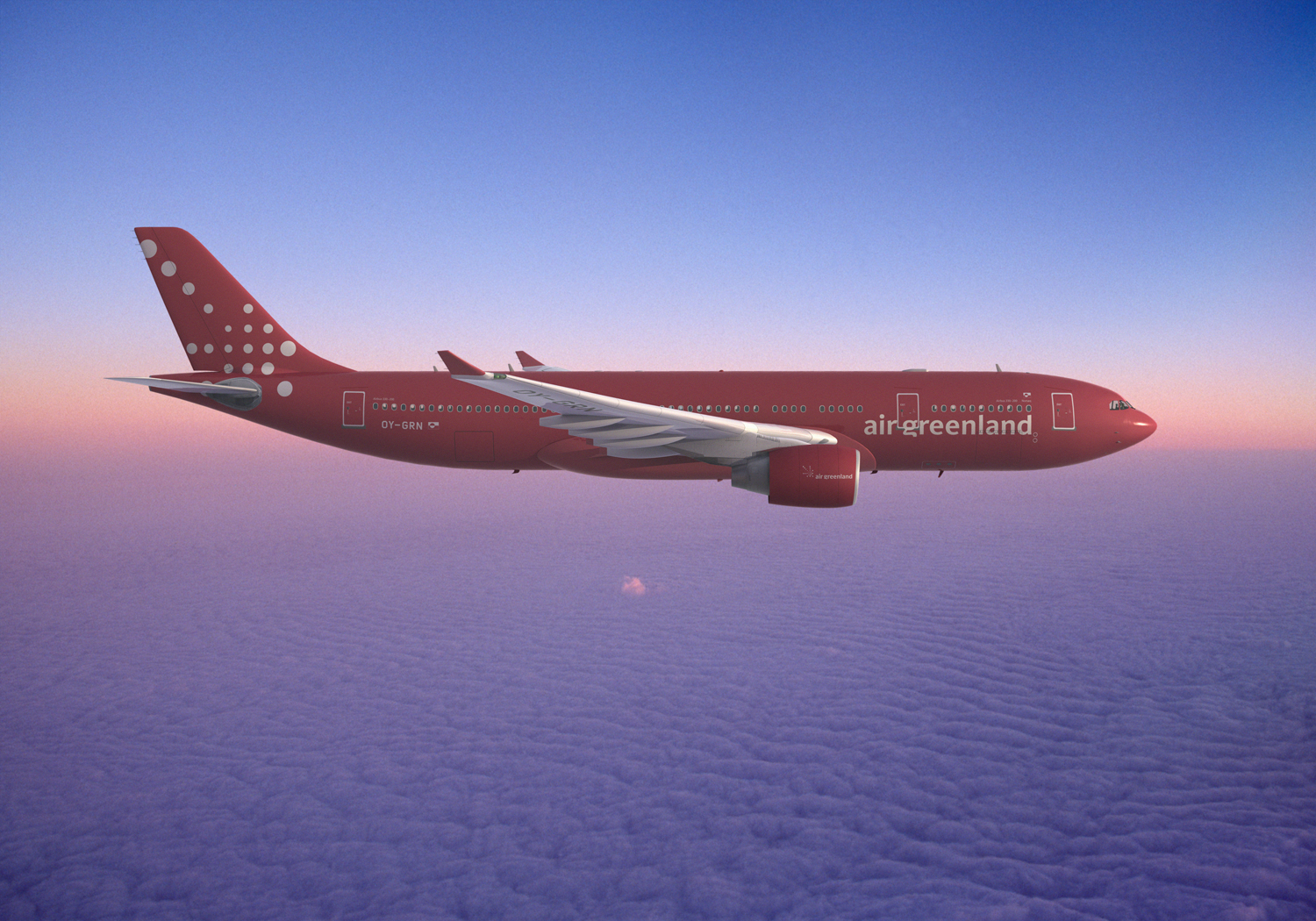
Air Greenland Airbus A330-200 in-flight.

== See also ==
- List of hotels in Greenland
- List of banks in Greenland
