= Economy of Greenland =

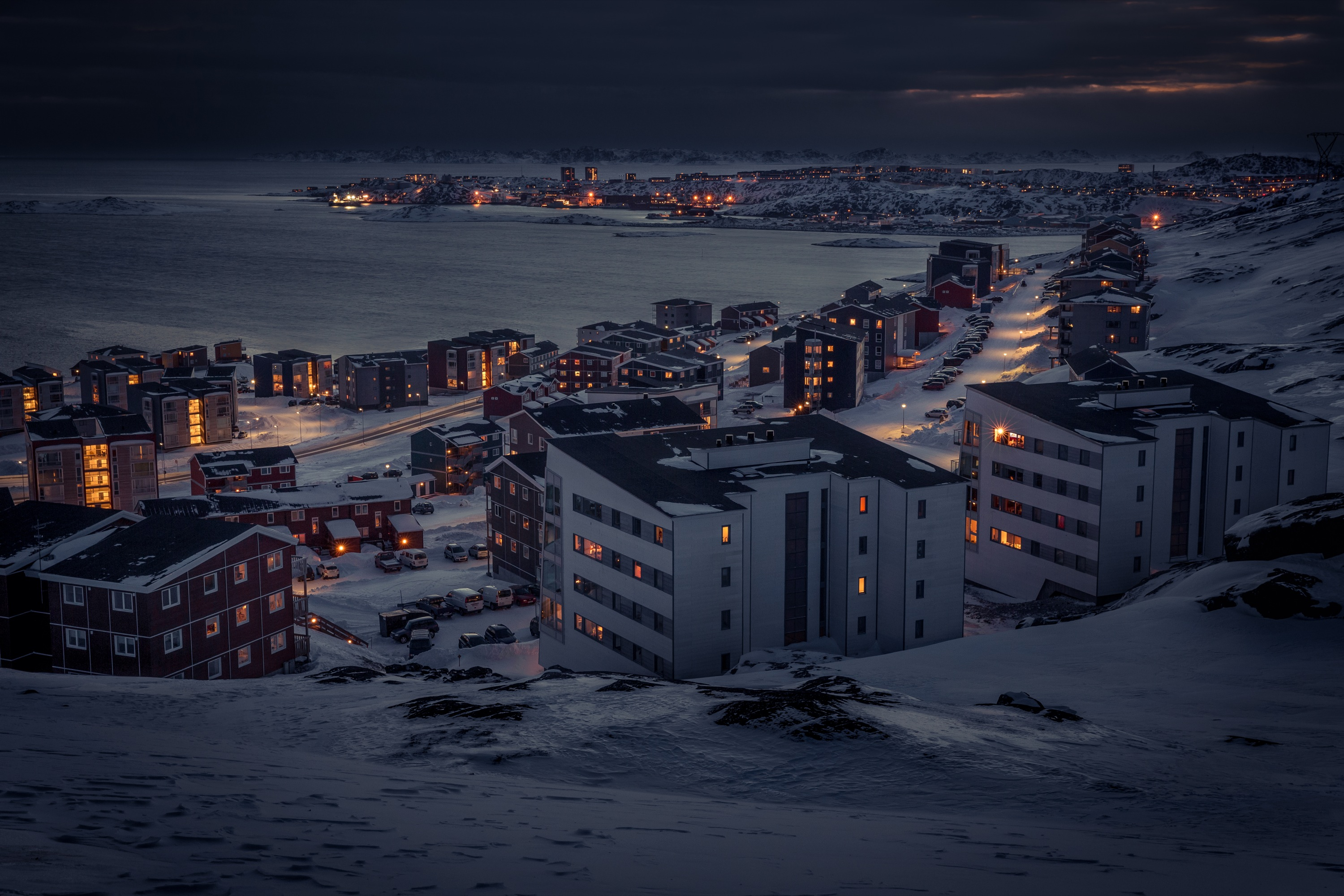
- Nuuk skyline at night
- Currency: Danish krone (DKK, kr.)
- Fiscal year: Calendar year
- Country group: High-income economy

Statistics
- Population: ▲56,831 (2025)
- GDP: ▲$3.32 billion (nominal, 2023); ▲$4.48 billion (PPP, 2023)
- GDP rank: — (nominal, 2023); — (PPP, 2023)
- GDP growth: 0.9% (2023)
- GDP per capita: ▲$58,499 (nominal, 2023); ▲$78,840 (PPP, 2023)
- GDP per capita rank: — (nominal, 2023); — (PPP, 2023)
- GDP per capita growth: 0.5% (2023)
- GDP by sector: agriculture: 17.5%; industry: 16.5%; services: 62.7%; (2021 est.)
- Inflation (CPI): ▼2.2% (2023 est.)
- Population below national poverty line: 16.2% (2015 est.)
- Gini coefficient: ▼33.9 medium (2015 est.)
- Human Development Index: 0.786 high (2010); (N/A rank, non-UN member)
- Labour force: 26,840 (2015 est.); ▲60% employment rate (2015)
- Labour force by occupation: agriculture: 15.9%; industry: 10.1%; services: 73.9%; (2015 est.)
- Unemployment: ▼2.9% (2023 est.)
- Main industries: fish processing (mainly shrimp and Greenland halibut); Oil, gold, niobium, tantalite, uranium, iron, and diamond mining; handicrafts, hides, skins, small shipyards

External
- Exports: ▼$1.58 billion (2024)
- Export goods: Fish and fish products
- Main export partners: EU 55.2%; Denmark 45.5%; Germany 2.85%; Poland 1.15%; China 23.9%; United Kingdom 5.58%; Japan 4.86%; Iceland 4.17%; Norway 2.21%
- Imports: ▼$992 million (2024)
- Import goods: machinery and transport equipment, manufactured goods, food, petroleum products
- Main import partners: EU 89.5%; Denmark 66.3%; Sweden 17.9%; Netherlands 2.79%; Germany 1.75%; Iceland 3.03%; Canada 2.60%; United States 1.29%; Norway 1.29%
- Gross external debt: ▼$36.4 million (2010)

Public finance
- Government debt: 13% of GDP (2015 est.)
- Budget balance: +5.6% (of GDP) (2016 est.)
- Revenue: 1.719 billion (2016 est.)
- Spending: 1.594 billion (2016 est.)
- Economic aid: $650 million subsidy from the Kingdom of Denmark (2012)
- All values, unless otherwise stated, are in US dollars.

Greenland has a developing economy, with a large public sector and extensive foreign trade. This has resulted in an economy with periods of strong growth, considerable inflation, unemployment problems and extreme dependence on capital inflow from the Kingdom Government. The economy is hampered by lack of infrastructure with less than 100 miles of paved roads and no railways. However, as of 2012, partly due to the retreating ice sheet due to climate change, it was starting to emerge as a territory rich with untapped mining resources.

== Overview ==
Greenland's per capita disposable income is the lowest in the Arctic other than Russia's, and less than one third that of the American state of Alaska. GDP per capita is close to the average for European economies, but the economy is critically dependent upon substantial support from the Danish government, which supplies about half the revenues of the self-rule government, which in turn employs 10,307 Greenlanders out of 25,620 currently in employment (2015). Unemployment nonetheless remains high, with the rest of the economy dependent upon demand for exports of shrimp and fish.

== Historical development ==
Except for an abortive royal colony established under Major Claus Paarss between 1728 and 1730, colonial Greenland was administered by companies under royal charter until 1908. Hans Egede's Hope Colony was organized under the auspices of the Bergen Greenland Company prior to its bankruptcy in 1727; it was succeeded by the merchant Jacob Severin (1733–1749), the General Trade Company (Det almindelige Handelskompagni; 1749–1774), and finally the Royal Greenland Trading Department (KGH; 1776–1908).

Early hopes of mineral or agricultural wealth were dashed, and open trade proved a failure owing to other nations' better quality, lower priced goods and hostility. Kale, lettuce, and other vegetables were successfully introduced, but repeated attempts to cultivate wheat or clover failed throughout Greenland, limiting the ability to raise European livestock. After government-funded whaling failed, the KGH eventually settled on maintaining the native Greenlanders in their traditional pursuits of hunting and whaling and enforced a monopoly on trade between them and Europe. Repeated attempts to open trade were opposed on both commercial and humanitarian grounds, although minor reforms in the 1850s and 60s lowered the prices charged to the natives for "luxuries" like sugar and coffee; transferred more of the KGH's profits to local communities; and granted the important Ivigtut cryolite concession to a separate company.

During the years before World War I, the KGH's independence was curtailed and the company folded into the Ministry of the Interior. Climate change, apparent since the 1920s, disrupted traditional Kalaallit life as the milder weather reduced the island's seal populations but filled the waters offshore with cod. After World War II, reforms were finally enacted by the Danish Greenland Commission composed of Greenland Provincial Council members and Danish economists. The report outlined a program to end the KGH model and establish a modern welfare state on the Danish model and supported by the Kingdom Government. The KGH monopolies were ended in 1950; Greenland was made an equal part of the Kingdom of Denmark in 1953 and Home Rule granted in 1979.

The KGH had long opposed urbanization of the Kalaallit Greenlanders, but during the 1950s and 1960s the Danish government introduced an urbanization and modernization program aimed at consolidating existing settlements. The program was intended to reduce costs, improve access to education and health care, and provide workers for modernized cod fisheries, which were growing rapidly at the time. The program faced a number of problems including the collapse of the fisheries and the shoddy construction of many of the buildings, particularly the infamous Blok P, and produced a number of problems of its own, including continuing unemployment and alcoholism.

Greenland left the European Economic Community in February 1985, principally due to EEC policies on fishing and sealskin. Most EU laws do not apply to Greenland; however, owing to its connection with Denmark, Greenland continues to enjoy preferential access to EU markets. In the same year, Greenland exercised its new control over the Royal Greenland Trading Company to reestablish it as KNI. Over the next few decades, divisions of the conglomerate were slowly spun off and competition within the Greenlandic economy somewhat increased.

Following the closure of the Maarmorilik lead and zinc mine in 1990 and the collapse of the cod fisheries amid colder ocean currents, Greenland faced foreign trade deficits and a shrinking economy, but it has been growing since 1993.

== Sectors of the economy ==
The Greenland economy is extremely dependent on exports of fish and on support from the Danish Government, which supplies about half of government revenues. To reduce its dependence on Denmark and prepare for independence, a longstanding priority of the Greenlandic government is increasing United States interest in the island; it seeks more American tourists, business and mining investment, and customers for its fish. The public sector, including publicly owned enterprises and the municipalities, plays the dominant role in the economy.

=== Governance ===
The largest employers in Greenland are the various levels of administration, including the central Kingdom Government in Denmark, the Local Greenland Self-Rule Government, and the municipalities. Most of these positions are in the capital Nuuk. Forty-three percent of Greenlanders work for the government, compared to 15% in the United States. In addition to this direct employment, the government heavily subsidizes other major employers in other areas of the economy, including Great Greenland Furhouse's seal skin purchases, Pilersuisoq's rural stores, and some of Air Greenland and Royal Arctic's regional routes.

=== Fishing industry ===
The second-largest sector by employment is Greenland's fishing industry. The commercial fishing fleet consists of approximately 5,000 dinghies, 300 cutters, and 25 trawlers. While cod was formerly the main catch, today the industry centers on cold-water shrimp and Greenland halibut.

The fish processing industry is almost entirely centered on Royal Greenland, the world's largest retailer of cold-water shrimp.

=== Hunting and whaling ===
Whaling and seal hunting were once traditional mainstays of Greenland's economy. Greenlanders still kill an estimated 170,000 seals a year and 175 whales a year, ranking them second and third in the world respectively. Both whaling and sealing have become controversial, limiting the potential market for their products. As such, the only seal tannery in the country – Great Greenland in Qaqortoq – is heavily subsidized by the government to maintain the livelihood of smaller communities which are economically dependent on the hunt.

Reindeer or caribou are found in the northwest of the island, while muskoxen are found in the northeast and at Kangerlussuaq. Because the muskoxen's natural range favors the protected Northeast Greenland National Park, it is a less common object of hunting than in the past. Polar bear and reindeer hunting in Greenland still occur but are regulated to avoid endangering the populations.

=== Retail ===
About half of total sales are conducted by KNI, the state-owned successor to the Royal Greenland Trade Department; its rural sales division Pilersuisoq; or its daughter company – which has been purchased by the Danish Dagrofa – Pisiffik. The third major chain is the Brugsen association of cooperatives.

=== Mining ===
Ivigtut used to be the world's premier source of natural cryolite, an important mineral in aluminum extraction, but the commercially viable reserves were depleted in the 1980s. Similarly, deposits of coal, diamonds, and many metals – including silver, nickel, platinum, copper, molybdenum, iron, niobium, tantalum, uranium, and rare earths – are known to exist, but as of 2011 not yet in commercially viable deposits, while Greenland's Bureau of Minerals and Petroleum was working to promote Greenland as an attractive destination for prospectors. In 2010, improvements in technology and increases in mineral prices led to some mines being reopened, such as the lead and zinc mine at Maamorilik and the gold mine at Nalunaq.

As of 2012, partly due to the retreating ice sheet due to climate change, Greenland was starting to emerge as a territory rich with untapped resources. Substantial volumes of minerals were within reach of geological land mapping technologies, according to research conducted by GlobalData

A difficulty is the island's lack of infrastructure. The CEO of Nunaminerals, which went bankrupt in 2015 after 17 years, said that unlike similar mineral deposits elsewhere, Greenland projects were greenfield land and needed new roads and power plants as well as the mine. Even in 2025, Greenland had less than 100 miles of paved roads.

As of 2025, Lumina was digging for anorthosite, and KoBold, financed by Jeff Bezos, Bill Gates and other billionaires for nickel. Critical Metals Corporation has been operating a mine in southern Greenland, backed by Cantor Fitzgerald of which Howard Lutnick has been the firm's chief executive prior to becoming commerce secretary in 2025.

=== Energy ===
Greenland electricity production by source

At 70%, Greenland has one of the highest shares of renewable energy in the world, mostly coming from hydropower.

While the Greenland Home Rule Government has primary sovereignty over mineral deposits on the mainland, oil resources are within the domain of the Danish exclusive economic zone. Nonetheless, prospecting takes place under the auspices of NUNAOIL, a partnership between the two governments. Some geologists believe Greenland has some of the world's largest remaining oil resources: in 2001, the U.S. Geological Survey found that the waters off north-eastern Greenland (north and south of the Arctic Circle) could contain up to 110 billion barrels (17×10^{9} m^{3}) of oil, and in 2010 the British petrochemical company Cairns Oil reported "the first firm indications" of commercially viable oil deposits. Nonetheless, all six wells drilled since the 1970s have been dry.

Greenland has offered eight license blocks for tender along its west coast by Baffin Bay. Seven of those blocks have been bid for by a combination of multinational oil companies and NUNAOIL. Companies that have participated successfully in the previous license rounds and have formed a partnership for the licenses with NUNAOIL are DONG Energy, Chevron, ExxonMobil, Husky Energy, and Cairn Energy. The area available known as the West Disko licensing round is of interest due to its relative accessibility compared to other Arctic basins, as the area remains largely free of ice and contains a number of promising geological leads and prospects from the Paleocene era.

Coal used to be mined at Qullissat but this has been suspended.

Electricity generation is controlled by the state-owned Nukissiorfiit. It is distributed at 220 V and 50 Hz and sockets of Danish type K are used. Electricity has historically been generated by oil or diesel power plants, even though there is a large surplus of potential hydropower. Because of rising oil prices, there is a program to build hydro power plants. Since the success of the 1993 Buksefjord dam, – whose distribution path to Nuuk includes the Ameralik Span – the long-term policy of the Greenland government is to produce the island's electricity from renewable domestic sources. A third turbine at Buksefjord brought its capacity up to 45 MW in 2008; in 2007, a second, 7.2 MW dam was constructed at Qorlortorsuaq; and in 2010, a third, 15 MW dam was constructed at Sisimiut. There is a plan for an Aluminium smelter plant, which requires multiple large (total 600-750 MW) hydropower plants. Domestic heating is provided by electricity at locations where there is a hydro power plant.

=== Tourism ===
Tourism is limited by the short summers and high costs. Access is almost exclusively by air, mainly from Scandinavia and Iceland. Some tourists arrive by cruise ship (but they don't spend much locally, since the ship provides accommodation and meals). There have been tests with direct flights from the US East Coast from 2007 to 2008, but these were discontinued, until United Airlines began flying seasonally again in 2025. The state-owned tourism agency Visit Greenland has the web address Greenland.com.

Tourism increased significantly between 2015 and 2019, with the number of visitors increasing from 77,000 per year to 105,000. One source estimated that in 2019 the revenue from this aspect of the economy was about 450 million kroner (US$67 million). Like many aspects of the economy, this slowed dramatically in 2020, and into 2021, due to restrictions required as a result of the COVID-19 pandemic; one source describes it as being the "biggest economic victim of the coronavirus". (The overall economy did not suffer too severely as of mid 2020, thanks to the fisheries.) Visitors would begin arriving again in late 2020 and early 2021. Greenland's goal is to develop it "right" and to "build a more sustainable tourism for the long run".

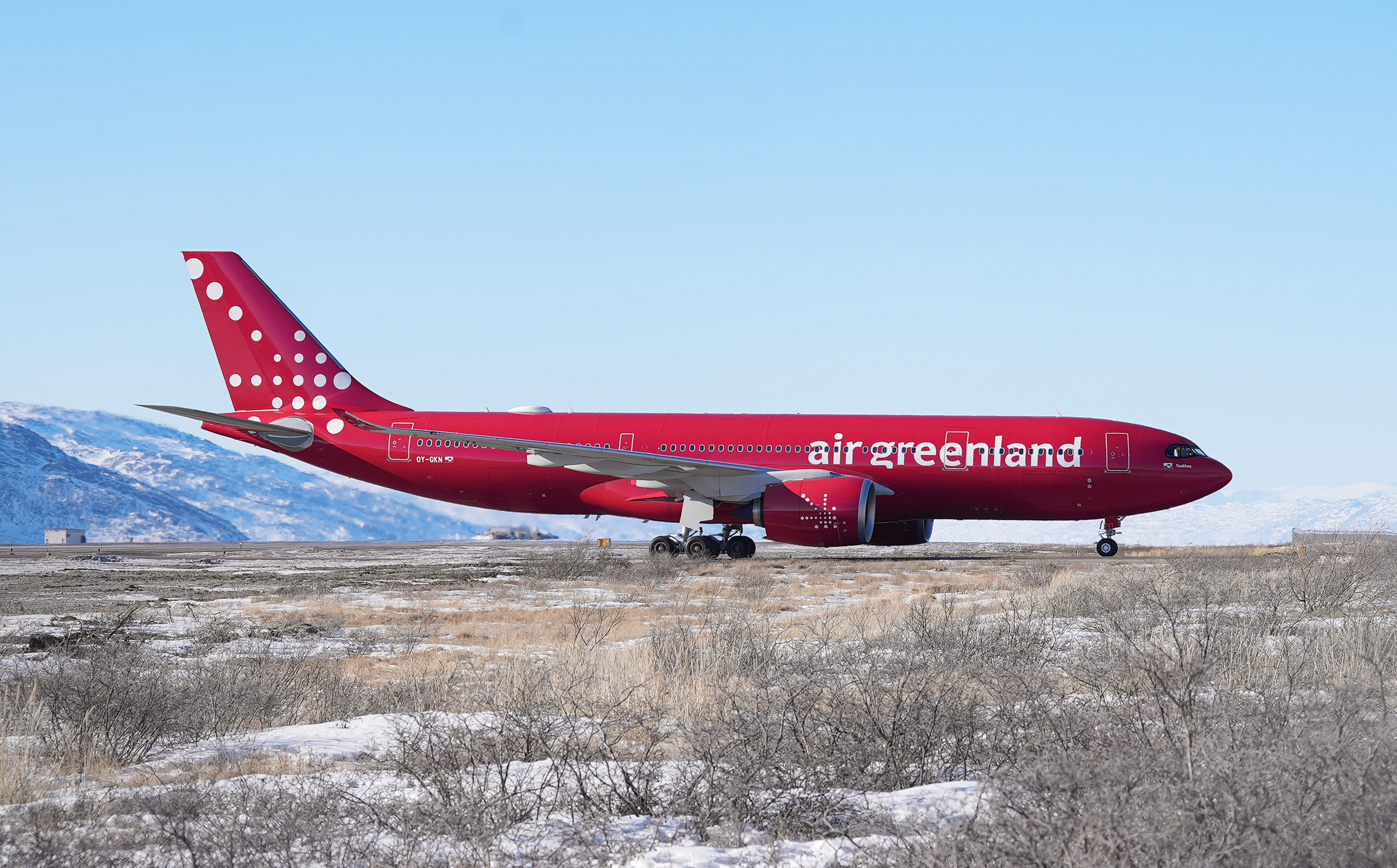
Air Greenland, also known as Greenlandair, is the flag carrier of Greenland and contributes an amount of tourists to the country.

=== Agriculture and forestry ===
Agriculture is of little importance in the economy but due to climate change – in southern Greenland, the growing season averages about three weeks longer than a decade ago – which has enabled expanded production of existing crops. At present, local production accounts for 10% of potatoes consumption in Greenland, but that is projected to grow to 15% by 2020. Similarly, it has enabled new crops like apples, strawberries, broccoli, cauliflower, cabbage, and carrots to be grown and for the cultivated areas of the country to be extended although even now only about 1% of Greenland is considered arable. Expanded production is subsidized by the government through purchase guarantees by the state-owned Neqi A/S grocery store chain.

The only native forest in Greenland is in the Qinngua Valley near Nanortalik. It is protected and not used for timber production.

=== Animal husbandry ===
Animal husbandry consists mainly of sheep farming, with free-grazing flocks. Modern sheep farming methods were introduced in the early 20th century, with the first farm built in 1906. The farms provide meat for local consumption and wool mainly for export. Some 20,000 lambs are slaughtered annually in Narsaq by the state-owned Neqi A/S. The lack of private land ownership rights on Greenland forces farmers to jointly agree to terms of land usage. In the south, there is also a small cattle farm.

Reindeer herding has been introduced to Greenland in waves since 1952. Supervision by Scandinavian Sami ended in 1978 and subsequent results were dismal. Repeated attempts in mid-west Greenland in the 1980s and the 1990s failed due to the immobility of the herds, which destroyed their forage. In 1998, the remaining herd was sold to the Nuuk municipality and removed through hunting. At that point, only one Greenlander was still a deer herder; the rest – about 20 people – were still hired Norwegian Sami. Although the conclusion was drawn that reindeer herding was incompatible with the local culture, the southern herds continue to prosper. In 2008, there was still a strong herd at the Isortoq Reindeer Station maintained by the Icelander Stefán Magnússon and Norwegian Ole Kristiansen.

== Economic statistics ==
Exports of Greenland by product category (2019) Chemical products Transportation Machines Mineral products Plastics and rubbers Metals Foodstuffs Precious metals Textiles Instruments Animal products Vegetable products Paper goods Footwear and headwear Miscellaneous Stone and glass Wood products Animal and vegetable bi-products Animal hides Arts and antiques Weapons

The following table shows the main economic indicators of Greenland in 1980–2023. Inflation below 5% is in green.

Year	GDP (in mil. US$ nominal)	GDP per capita (in US$ nominal)	GDP growth (real)	Inflation rate (in Percent)	Unemployment (in Percent)
1980	476.0	9,483.1	▲9.2%	▲11.6%	n/a
1981	▼435.7	▼8,544.1	▼−4.4%	▲14.9%	n/a
1982	▼402.4	▼7,813.7	▲0.6%	▲13%	n/a
1983	▲416.1	▲7,988.2	▼−3.4%	▲9.7%	n/a
1984	▼379.3	▼7,198.7	▲5.3%	▲8.9%	n/a
1985	▲412.8	▲7,760.8	▲7.9%	▲7.4%	n/a
1986	▲603.0	▲11,271.3	▲7.5%	▲4.1%	n/a
1987	▲787.3	▲14,554.4	▲3.6%	▲4.6%	n/a
1988	▲898.6	▲16,398.0	▲0.3%	▲6.4%	n/a
1989	▲929.7	▲16,813.7	▲3.2%	▲5.3%	n/a
1990	▲1,018.9	▲18,326.9	▼−4.2%	▲5.1%	n/a
1991	▼1,016.5	▼18,315.3	▲1.0%	▲3.2%	n/a
1992	▲1,037.9	▲18,768.8	▼−0.5%	▲1.5%	n/a
1993	▼927.2	▼16,797.4	▲4.7%	▲1%	n/a
1994	▲1,005.8	▲18,124.1	▲5.3%	▲0.5%	n/a
1995	▲1,208.9	▲21,665.8	▲4.4%	▲2.1%	n/a
1996	▼1,197.5	▼21,422.5	▲2.2%	▲1%	n/a
1997	▼1,072.1	▼19,145.6	▲3.4%	▲0.5%	n/a
1998	▲1,149.8	▲20,496.6	▲0.3%	▲1%	n/a
1999	▼1,131.5	▼20,170.3	▲0.5%	▲1.1%	n/a
2000	▼1,068.0	▼19,004.0	▲7.1%	▲2.1%	n/a
2001	▲1,086.1	▲19,275.4	▲1.3%	▲3.4%	n/a
2002	▲1,169.1	▲20,652.8	▼-1%	▲3.1%	n/a
2003	▲1,558.7	▲27,459.9	▲4.4%	▲6.5%	n/a
2004	▲1,822.4	▲32,023.7	▲6.9%	▼-0.5%	n/a
2005	▲1,849.8	▲32,489.7	▲5%	▼-3.2%	n/a
2006	▲2,013.1	▲35,458.3	▲5.6%	▲2.2%	n/a
2007	▲2,249.8	▲39,780.9	▲2.4%	0%	n/a
2008	▲2,499.0	▲44,366.8	▲6.2%	▼-2%	n/a
2009	▲2,529.9	▲44,918.8	▲0.9%	▲5.5%	n/a
2010	▼2,503.1	▼43,988.5	▲1.7%	▲2.0%	7.8%
2011	▲2,684.4	▲47,186.9	▼-0.5%	▲2.9%	▲9.4%
2012	▼2,609.6	▼45,937.0	▲1.4%	▲3.4%	▲9.8%
2013	▲2,684.9	▲47,535.5	▼-1.3%	▲1.1%	▲10.1%
2014	▲2,842.0	▲50,485.2	▲4.7%	▲1%	▲10.3%
2015	▼2,499.1	▼44,536.4	▼−2.5%	▲8.1%	▼9.1%
2016	▲2,707.1	▲48,181.7	▲4.7%	▲3.5%	▼6.3%
2017	▲2,851.6	▲50,765.7	▲0.1%	▲3.3%	▼5.9%
2018	▲3,055.7	▲54,545.1	▲0.6%	▲1.8%	▼5%
2019	▼2,997.3	▼53,309.2	▲2.8%	▲0.7%	▼4.3%
2020	▲3,089.6	▲54,812.7	▲0.2%	▲0.7%	▼4.5%
2021	▲3,293.5	▲58,136.0	▲1.3%	▼-0.4%	▼3.7%
2022	▼3,152.3	▼55,635.0	▲2.0%	▲2.7%	▼3.2%
2023	▲3,326.5	▲58,499.0	▲0.9%	▲2.2%	▼2.9%

== See also ==
- Greenland krone
- Bank of Greenland
