= List of supermarket chains in North America =

This is a list of supermarket chains in North America.

== Canada ==
- Loblaw companies
  - Loblaws / Loblaw GreatFood / Loblaws CityMarket
  - Your Independent Grocer / Independent CityMarket
  - Atlantic Superstore
  - Dominion
  - Maxi / Maxi & Cie
  - Real Canadian Superstore
  - Fortinos
  - Freshmart
  - L'Intermarché
  - No Frills
  - Provigo
  - Shoppers Drug Mart / Pharmaprix
  - SuperValu
  - Valu-mart
  - Wholesale Club
  - T&T Supermarkets
  - Zehrs
- Metro inc.
  - metro / metro plus
  - Food Basics
  - Super C
  - Marché Adonis
- Empire Company Limited
  - Sobeys
  - Foodland
  - FreshCo
  - Farm Boy
  - IGA / IGA Extra
  - Lawtons
  - Longo's
  - Needs
  - Safeway
  - Thrifty Foods
- Giant Tiger
- Walmart Canada
- Whole Foods Market

== Costa Rica ==
- Walmart

== Dominican Republic ==
- Carrefour
- Hipermercados Olé
- Jumbo
- La Sirena
- Supermercados Bravo
- Supermercados Nacional

== Greenland ==
- Brugseni (7 stores)
- Pisiffik (11 supermarket stores)
- Spar (11 supermarket stores)
- Pilersuisoq (64 stores)

== Honduras ==
- PriceSmart (Wholesale Club)
- Walmart

== Nicaragua ==
- PriceSmart
- Walmart

== Panama ==
- PriceSmart
