= List of Greenlandic regions by income per capita =

This is a list of municipalities and districts of Greenland ranked by per capita income.

== Municipalities ==
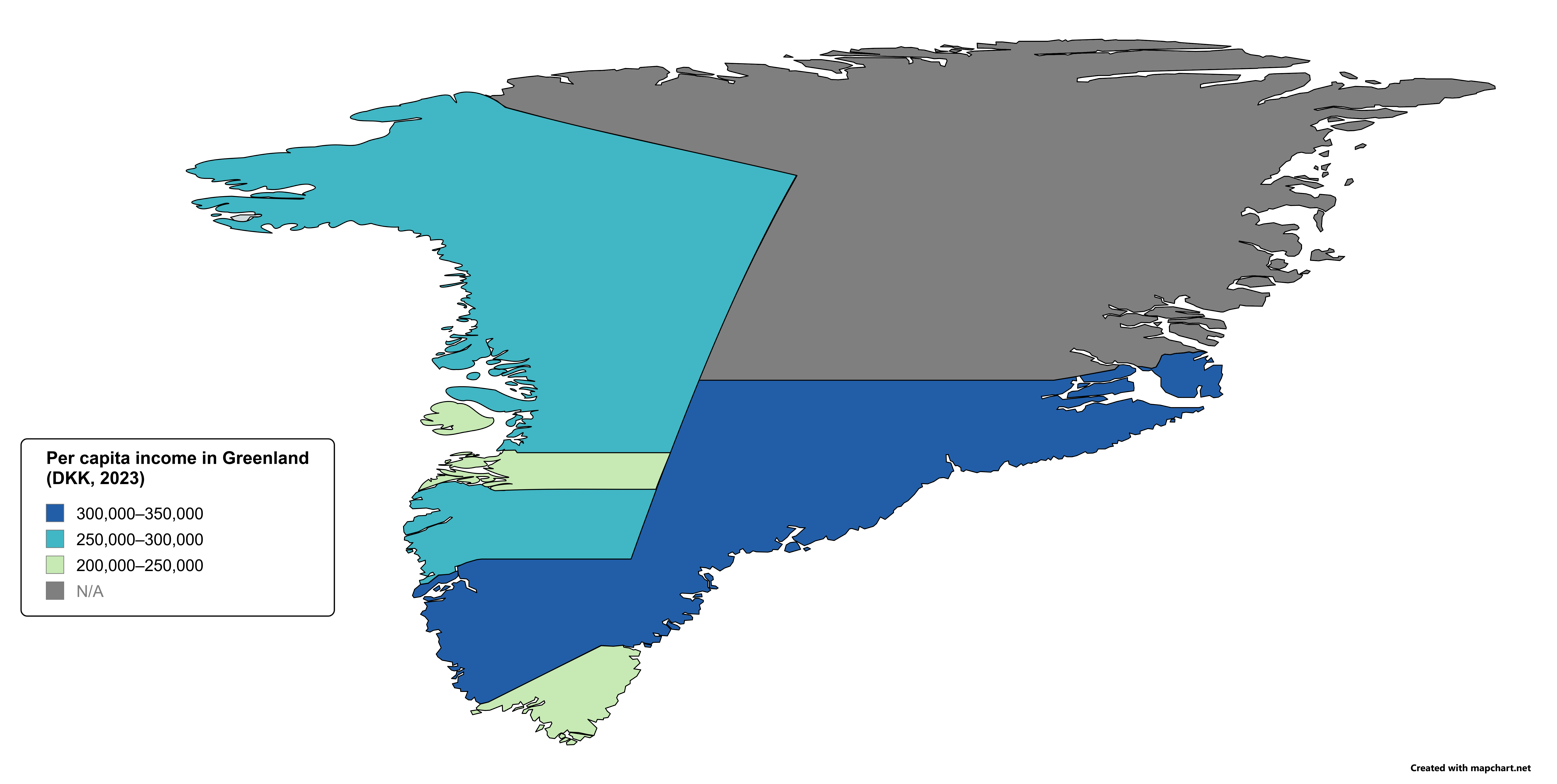
Map of Greenlandic municipalities categorized by per capita income (DKK, 2023)

Rank	Municipality	Per capita income (DKK, 2023)
1	Sermersooq	338,776
–	Greenland	291,577
2	Qeqqata	286,765
3	Avannaata	252,052
4	Kujalleq	242,406
5	Qeqertalik	229,605

== Districts ==
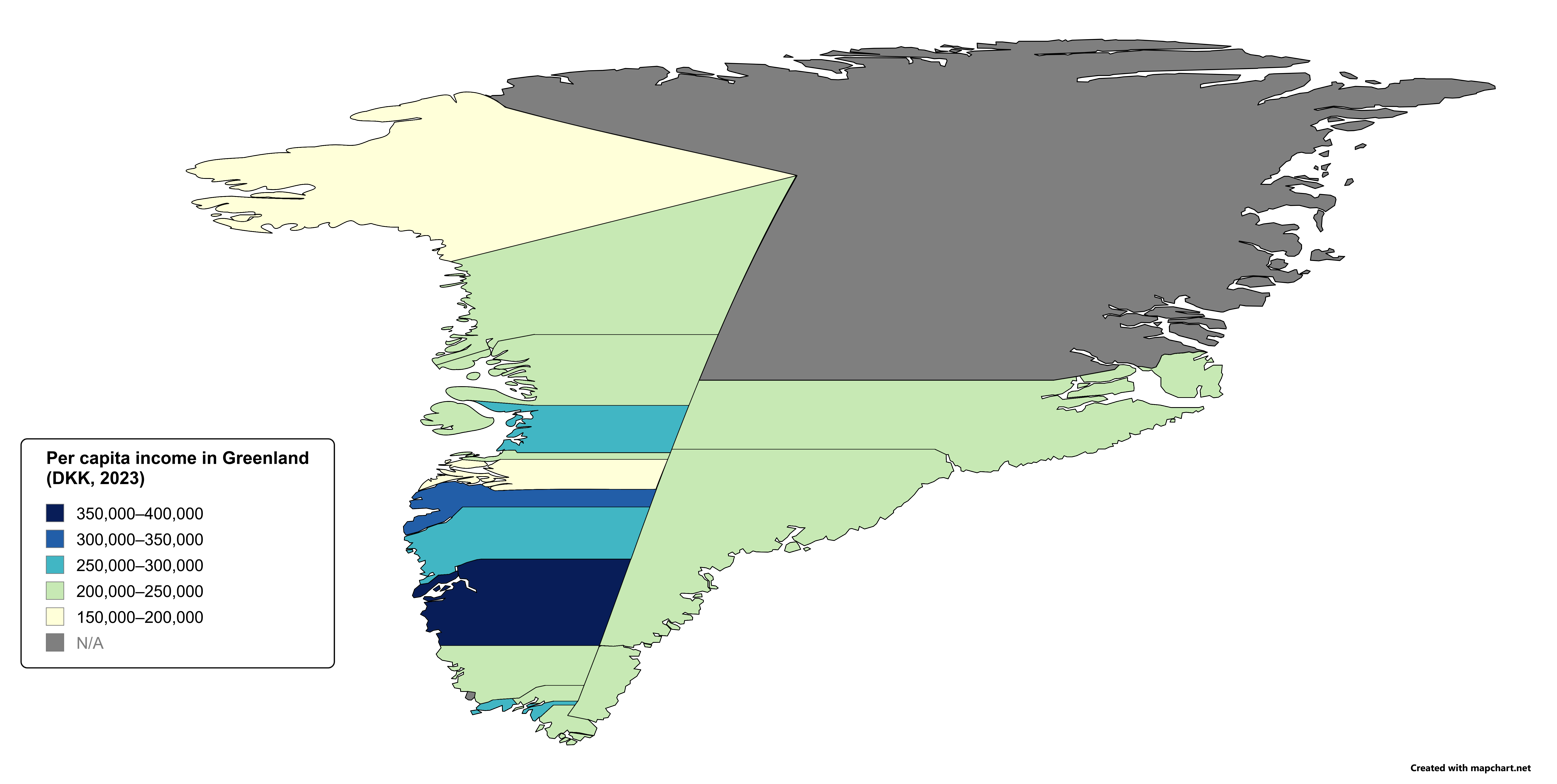
Map of Greenlandic districts categorized by per capita income (DKK, 2023)

Rank	District	Per capita income (DKK, 2023)
1	Nuuk	363,477
2	Sisimiut	300,935
3	Ilulissat	292,476
–	Greenland	291,577
4	Qaqortoq	262,814
5	Maniitsoq	259,634
6	Qasigiannguit	243,671
7	Uummannaq	238,954
8	Aasiaat	237,403
9	Narsaq	235,112
10	Ittoqqortoormiit	235,103
11	Qeqertarsuaq	234,398
12	Paamiut	222,323
13	Tasiilaq	217,794
14	Nanortalik	207,808
15	Upernavik	201,974
16	Kangaatsiaq	186,790
17	Qaanaaq	184,954
–	Ivittuut	N/A (Note: No permanent population)

== See also ==
- Administrative divisions of Greenland
- Economy of Greenland
