= Brugsen =

Brugsen, the Danish contraction of Brugsforeningen, may refer to:

- Brugsen supermarket chain in Denmark, owned by Coop amba
- Brugsen or Brugseni supermarket chain in Greenland. The company name is Kalaallit Nunaanni Brugseni AmbA
