= List of banks in Greenland =

Banks in Greenland include the following:

- Bank of Greenland (GrønlandsBANKEN) SWIFT: GRENGLGX
- Bankivik (Formerly BankNordik, part of Føroya Banki) SWIFT: FIFBFOTX

Greenland currently has one main commercial bank since the merger of Bank of Greenland and Nuna Bank in 1997.
