= Sisimiut Hydro Power Plant =

Power station in Greenland

Sisimiut hydroelectric power plant
- Country: Greenland
- Location: Sisimiut
- Coordinates: 67°6′49″N 53°20′56″W
- Status: Operational
- Construction began: 2007
- Commission date: 2010

Power generation
- Nameplate capacity: 15 MW

Sisimiut Hydro Power Plant is a hydroelectric power plant near Sisimiut, Greenland. Construction started in March 2007 and the plant was commissioned on 7 April 2010. The initial capacity of the power plant is 15 MW. It is owned by the national power company, Nukissiorfiit.

The plant was designed by Verkís, constructed by Ístak and commissioned by Landsvirkjun, all Icelandic companies. The construction included 3,000 cubic metres (110,000 cu ft) of concrete constructions, a blasted tunnel with length of 4,700 metres (15,400 ft) and a pressure pipe with length of 400 metres (1,300 ft). The altitude difference is 78.6 metres (258 ft). Produced electricity is transferred to Sisimiut by new 27.4 kilometres (17.0 mi) long 60 kV high voltage lines.
