= Qorlortorsuaq =

- Location within Greenland
- Coordinates: 60°46′30″N 45°13′54″W
- State: Kingdom of Denmark
- Constituent country: Greenland
- Municipality: Kujalleq

Population (2020)
  - Total: 4
- Time zone: UTC-03
- Postal code: 3919

Qorlortorsuaq is a village in the Nanortalik district, in the Kujalleq municipality in southern Greenland, located at the site of the largest waterfall in the country; the waterfall also goes by the name of Qorlortorsuaq. In 2020, the town had only 4 inhabitants. The population consists mostly of farmers. Qorlortorsuaq also houses the only trout farm in the country.

Qorlortorsuaq is a location of the Qorlortorsuaq hydroelectric dam. The hydropower plant is part of the focus of the government of Greenland to replace fossil fuelled power plants with renewable energy, and is only one of a number of hydroelectric projects planned for construction. The plant has made it possible to decommission the three aging diesel generators, so called "bunker fuel generators" made from old ship engines, that previously provided electricity to the towns.

== See also ==
- List of waterfalls
