= Verkís =

Icelandic consulting firm

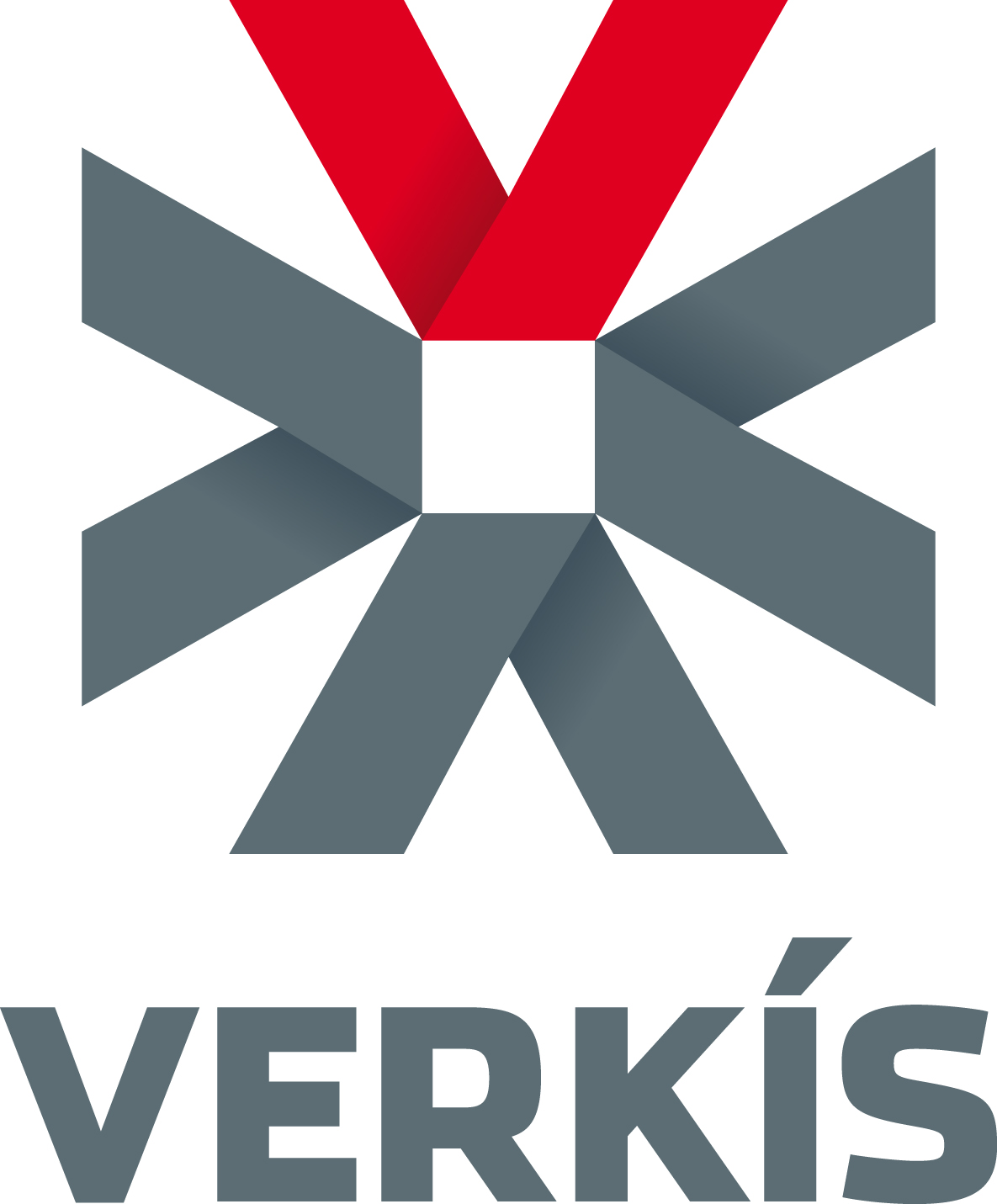
- Industry: Engineering, geothermal energy, renewable energy
- Founded: Iceland (1932)
- Headquarters: Reykjavík, Iceland
- Number of employees: 380 (2026)
- Website: verkis.com

Verkís Consulting Engineers is the oldest consulting firm in Iceland and is one of the largest engineering firms in Iceland with around 380 employees. Verkís is a multidisciplinary consulting firm, providing services in all fields of engineering and related professional disciplines of consulting. Verkís offers engineering, consulting, management, operational and EPCM services. Core disciplines include geothermal and hydroelectric power and Verkís has participated in nearly all geothermal and hydroelectric projects in Iceland as well as in several projects abroad. Other core disciplines include geothermal district heating, power transmission, buildings, transport, infrastructure and industry. Ever since the early 1930s, Verkís has participated in the engineering of most of Iceland's biggest and most prominent construction projects, covering disciplines such as civil and structural design, mechanical engineering, electrical HV, MV, and LV engineering, systems engineering, automation and control. Egill Viðarsson is the CEO and Snæbjörn Jónsson is the chairman of the board. The headquarters are in Reykjavík but in addition there are eleven branches around Iceland.

== History ==
Verkís traces its origin back to 1932, making it the oldest consulting company in Iceland, and has a firm background in the energy- and construction industry both in Iceland and abroad. Verkís was formed in 2008 by the merger of five well established Icelandic engineering consulting firms:

=== VST - Verkfræðistofa Sigurðar Thoroddsen ===
VST was established in 1932 and has over the years provided a wide range of services. Consultancy services in the building industry, energy and infrastructure has been the main area of activity and VST took part in most hydropower projects in Iceland. In recent years, VST has offered a variety of other services, especially within the aluminium industry, and also in the fields of project management, construction, safety and environmental management.

=== Rafteikning ===
Rafteikning was established in 1965 and has been one of the leading electrical consulting service firms in Iceland. The main focus of activity has been on power and control engineering and the firm has participated in the electrical design of several hydropower and geothermal power plants.

=== Fjarhitun ===
Fjarhitun was established in 1962 and has been a leader in designing district heating systems, utilizing the geothermal hot water in Iceland and has also participated in the design of many geothermal power plants. Fjarhitun has provided a wide range of services in other fields of mechanical engineering.

=== Fjölhönnun ===
Fjölhönnun was established in 1970 and has been active in the design of roads, bridges and similar structures and the structural design of buildings. The firm has also participated in many projects, providing supervision and project management.

=== RT-Rafagnatækni ===
RT Rafagnatækni was established in 1961 and has specialized in the planning, design and programming of control systems for power plants and other systems in the field of automation, measurements and communication. RT has also been providing services in field of electronics.

=== Almenna Consulting Engineers (Almenna verkfræðistofan hf.) ===
On 17 April 2013 Almenna Consulting teamed up with Verkís.

Almenna Consulting Engineers Ltd. was founded in 1941 as "Almenna byggingarfélagið", it played an important role in modernising the infrastructure of the country as it took part in developing the country's first large hydroelectric power plants in the 1960s. In 1971, the company was reorganized as Almenna Consulting Engineers Ltd.

== Management and Organisation ==
Verkís is divided into seven divisions, five of which are business segment divisions. In addition to the business segment divisions, there is an office support division and a branch office division. Each business segment division is split into discipline sections. The management team consist of the CEO and seven division managers. The board represents the owners of the company and has five members and two alternate members.

== Services ==
Verkís provides consultancy services in most fields of engineering and related disciplines. The services offered includes: Project Management and EPCM, Cost Estimation and Planning, Engineering and Design, Project Controls, Feasibility studies, Inspection services, Procurement, and Commissioning. Support functions such as Risk Assessment, Quality Management, Health Safety and Environment, and the development of Environmental Impact Assessments are also an integral part of the services.

== Project Examples ==
- Kárahnjúkar Hydropower Plant
- Qorlortorsuaq Dam
- Ilulissat Hydro Electric Project
- Hellisheiði Power Station
- Reykjavík district heating
- Harpa Concert Hall
- Arnarnesvegur Highway Project
- Veröld - Vigdís-house, University of Iceland
- Selfoss Sports Centre
- Vaðlaheiðargöng
- Keflavík International Airport
- National Theatre of Iceland
- Stapaskóli elementary school
- Sea bath in Húsavík
- Sundhöll Reykjavíkur

== Branches ==
- Akureyri
- Akranes
- Blönduós
- Borgarnes
- Egilsstaðir
- Hvammstangi
- Húsavík
- Ísafjörður
- Reykjanesbær
- Sauðarkrókur
- Selfoss

== Subsidiaries ==
- OPVC Norway
- Verkís Greenland
- LP-Verkis

== Affiliated companies ==
- HRV Engineering, Iceland
- Raförninn, Iceland
- Svarmi, Iceland
