= KNI A/S =

Danish trade conglomerate

KNI Greenland Trade
- Type: Government-owned corporation
- Industry: Retail; Public services Beverage; Liquid fuels Lubricants; Service
- Predecessor: Royal Greenland Trading Department (KGH)
- Founded: KGH: 1774; Kalaallit Niuerfiat: 1986; KNI: 1992
- Headquarters: Sisimiut, Greenland
- Area served: Greenland
- Key people: Peter Grønvold Samuelsen
- Revenue: DKK 1,314,916,000
- Net income: DKK 70,643,000
- Number of employees: 804
- Subsidiaries: Neqi & KNI Ejendomme (100%); Akia Sisimiut (82.5%)
- Website: kni.gl

KNI A/S or Greenland Trade (Greenlandic: Kalaallit Niuerfiat, Danish: Grønlands Handel) is a trading conglomerate in Greenland. It is the successor to the Royal Greenland Trading Department, which controlled the government of Greenland itself from 1774 to 1908 and possessed a monopoly on Greenlandic trade from 1776 to 1950. Today, the company remains a major component of the Greenlandic economy and remains fully owned by the local government. The company is based in Sisimiut (Holsteinsborg), Greenland's second-largest city, located in mid-western Greenland's Qeqqata Municipality.

== History ==
The Royal Greenland Trading Department (Den Kongelige Grønlandske Handel, KGH) was founded in 1774 as a Dano-Norwegian state enterprise charged with administering the Danish settlements and trade in Greenland. In the early 20th century, most of its administrative functions were lost to the Danish Ministry of the Interior and the company's monopoly was finally ended in 1950. Following the establishment of the Home Rule Government in 1979, control of KGH was ceded in 1986 and the company was reorganized as Kalaallit Niuerfiat. This was then reorganized into the KNI conglomerate in 1992.

The conglomerate's fishing operations were spun off as Royal Greenland A/S in 1990 and its shipping operations as Royal Arctic Line A/S in 1992. On January 1, 1993, KNI was restructured into a holding company KNI-mik Piginnittut and two subsidiaries, KNI Pisiffik and KNI Pilersuisoq, both including aspects of the parent company's retail division. KNI Pisiffik was based in Greenland's larger towns and was an experiment in running the stores without government subsidy; KNI Pilersuisoq was located in the more distant and less populous towns and was understood to require public underwriting. Pisiffik A/S was then spun off in 2001 and the competition between the two chains blossomed into a price war after KNI opened a discount Pilersuisoq in Aasiaat in 2008, even though both companies were state-owned at the time (A majority stake in Pisiffik has since been sold to Dagrofa, a Danish food concern).

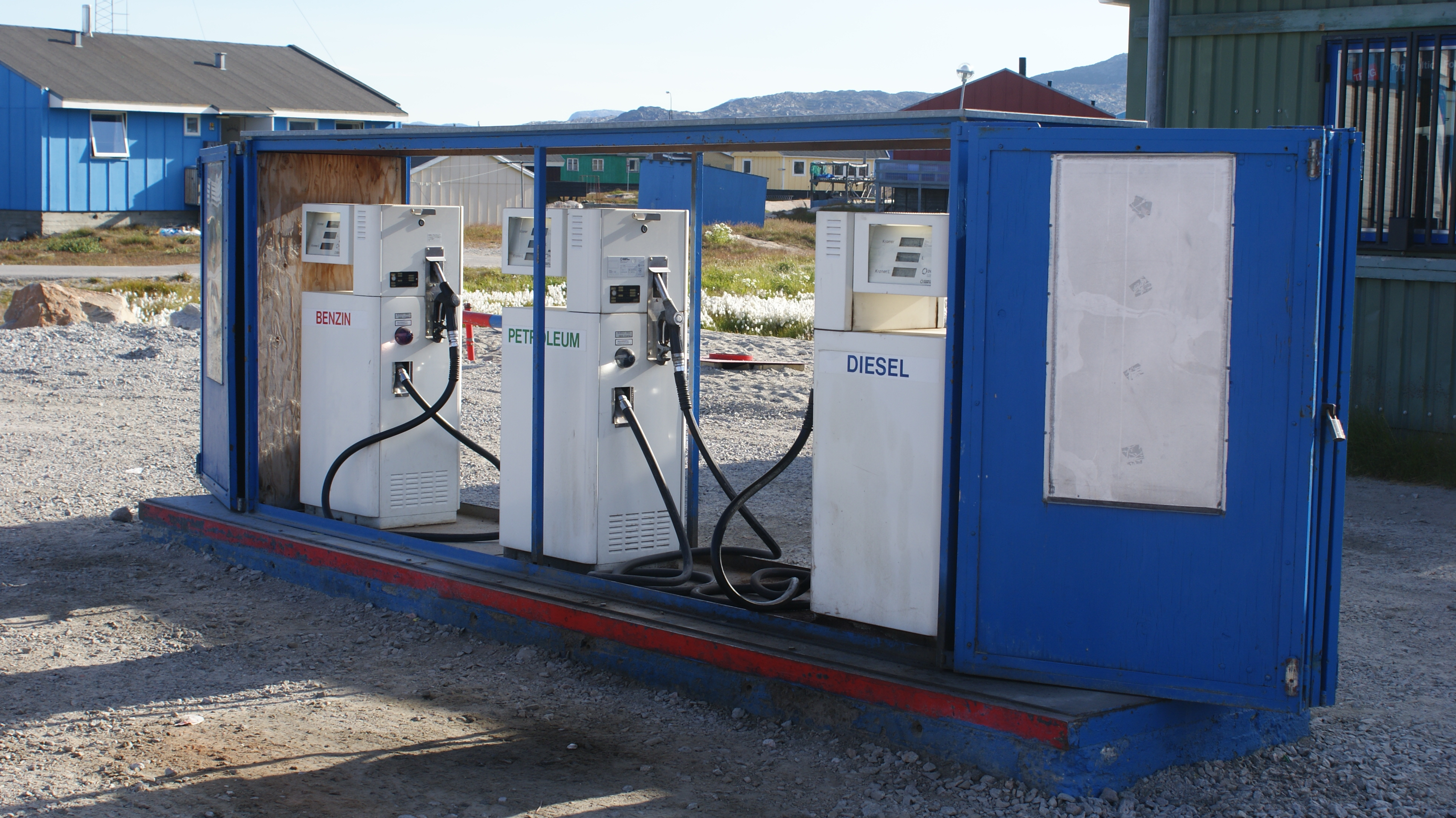
A gas station in Ilulissat.

== Divisions ==
=== Pilersuisoq ===
Since the initial experiment, KNI has folded Pilersuisoq back in as a division of the parent company. It continues to operate a chain of all-purpose general stores in remote locations under government subsidy (roughly DKK 40m per year) as well as some smaller towns still unserved by Pisiffik or the newer entrant Brugsen. It also operates some Post Greenland and Bank of Greenland offices, manages duty-free stores at Kangerlussuaq and Narsarsuaq Airports, and services for Air Greenland related to helicopter flights to and from the smaller settlements.

=== Polaroil ===
Another division is the company's liquid fuel distribution network, Polaroil, which employs 70 full-time-equivalent staff and operates 70 stations across Greenland. The removal of its headquarters from Maniitsoq to Sisimiut in 2010 provoked protests from the small community already experiencing depopulation.

== Subsidiaries ==
The company wholly owns two subsidiary companies – Neqi A/S and KNI Ejendomme A/S – and has a strong majority stake (82.5%) in a third – Akia Sisimiut A/S.

=== Neqi ===
Neqi A/S is another grocery store chain, selling fish and meat along with Greenlandic produce made economical through guaranteed purchasing provided by KNI on behalf of the Greenlandic government. The principal slaughterhouse is in Narsaq.

=== KNI Property ===
KNI Ejendomme A/S is a wholly owned subsidiary which manages KNI's real estate holdings and investments.
