= Almenna Consulting Engineers =

Almenna Consulting Engineers Ltd. (Icelandic: Almenna verkfræðistofan hf.) is an Icelandic engineering company. Founded in 1941 as "Almenna byggingarfélagið", it played an important role in modernising the infrastructure of the country as it took part in developing the country's first large hydroelectric power plants in the 1960s.

In 1971, the company was reorganized as Almenna Consulting Engineers Ltd. Since then, it has structurally designed many of Iceland's most high-profile buildings, such as the Reykjavík City Hall and the Leifur Eiriksson Air Terminal at Keflavík International Airport. Today, it has about 80 employees; f.x. civil engineers and mechanical engineers as well as graphic and technical designers.

The company's headquarters are at Fellsmúli 26, 108 Reykjavík. Also, it maintains three branch offices, in Akranes, Reykjanesbær and Fjarðabyggð. The managing director is Helgi Valdimarsson.
