= Qorlortorsuaq Dam =

Dam in Greenland

- Location within Greenland
- Country: Greenland
- Coordinates: 60°46′45.90″N 45°14′27.27″W
- Status: Operational
- Construction began: 2003
- Opening date: 2007
- Owner: Nukissiorfiit

Dam and spillways
- Type of dam: Gravity
- Height: 15 m (49 ft)
- Length: 80 m (262 ft)
- Spillway capacity: 3.9 m^{3}/s (138 cu ft/s)

Reservoir
- Total capacity: 108,000,000 m^{3} (88,000 acre⋅ft)
- Surface area: 2.4–5.1 km^{2} (0.9–2.0 sq mi)

Power Station
- Coordinates: 60°46′33.98″N 45°14′13.19″W
- Operator: Landsvirkjun
- Turbines: 2 x 3.8 MW
- Installed capacity: 7.6 MW
- Capacity factor: 41%
- Annual generation: 27.5 GWh

Qorlortorsuaq Dam is a hydroelectric dam near Qorlortorsuaq in the Nanortalik district of the Kujalleq municipality in southern Greenland. It has a capacity of 7.6 MW and it generates power for the neighbouring towns of Qaqortoq and Narsaq.

== History ==
The construction of the power plant started in December 2003 and was completed in October 2007. It was built by consortium of E. Pihl & Son AS (51%), YIT (34%), and Landsvirkjun (15%). Landsvirkjun operates the power plant until 2012, when operation will be transferred to the Kujalleq municipality. The design and engineering was performed by Icelandic companies Verkís and Efla.

== Description ==
Qorlortorsuaq Dam is a concrete gravity dam with height of 15 metres (49 ft) and crest length of 80 metres (260 ft). It creates a reservoir with a capacity of 108 million cubic meters. Its tunnel length is 245 metres (804 ft) and pressure pipe is 245 metres (804 ft). The flow rate is 3.9 cubic metres per second (140 cu ft/s).

The power plant has two horizontal axis 3.8 MW Francis turbines manufactured by Kössler for a total installed capacity of 7.6 MW. Its annual generation is 27.5 GWh. A crew of four maintains the power plant.

Together with the power plant a 70 kilometres (43 mi) long high voltage (70 kV) line to Qaqortoq and Narsaq was erected. It crosses over the Igaliko Fjord, a more than 2 km long span, between these two pylons: 60.812446°N 45.661606°W and 60.777958°N 45.595286°W.

== Green Power program ==
The hydropower plant is part of the plan of the Greenland Home Rule government to replace fossil fuelled energy production and storage with sustainable power production.
