= Buksefjord hydroelectric power plant =

Hydroelectric power plant in Greenland

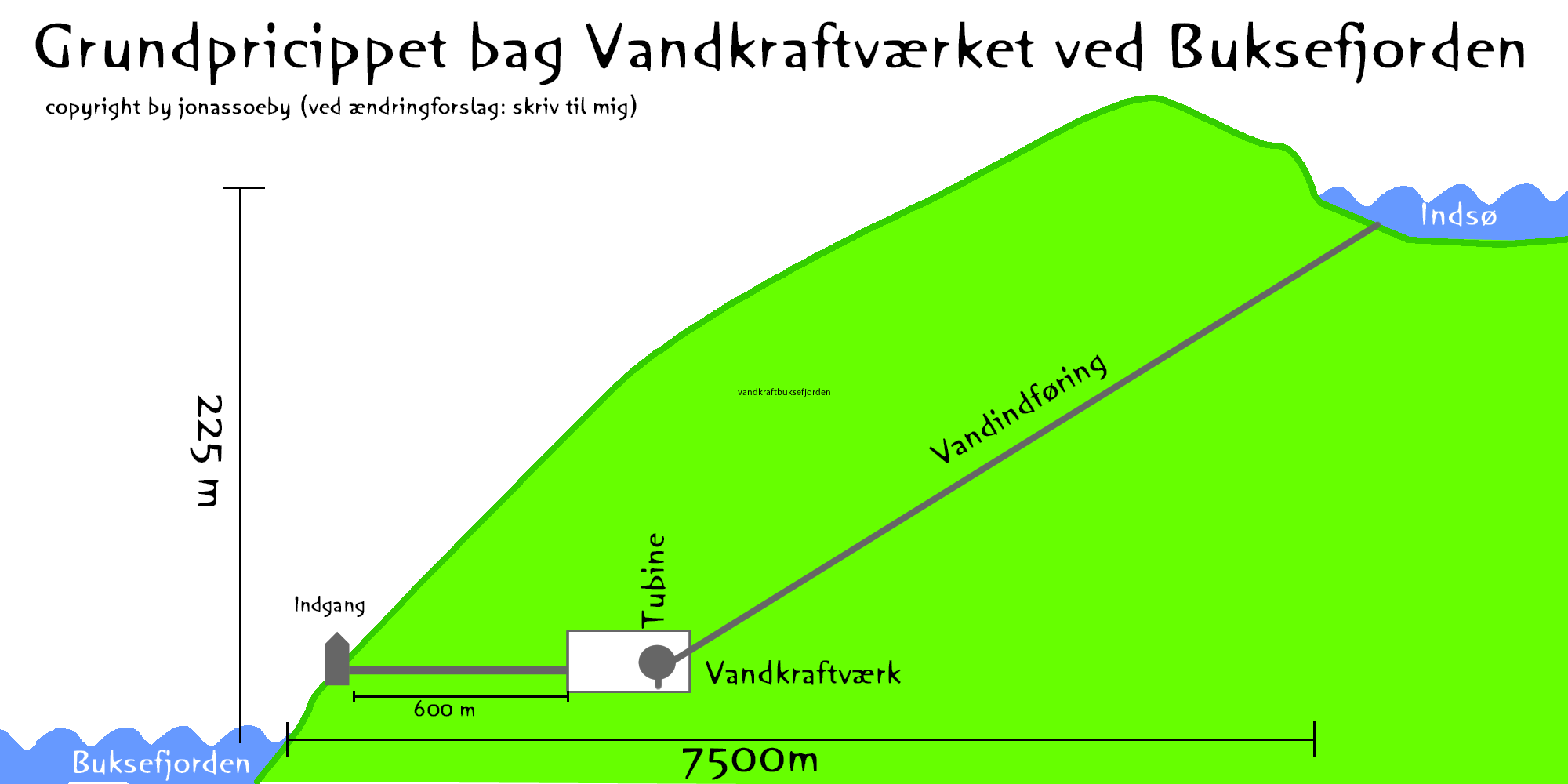
- Country: Greenland
- Location: Buksefjord
- Coordinates: 63°55′16″N 50°53′26″W
- Status: Operational
- Construction began: 1990
- Commission date: 1993
- Construction cost: $ 190.23 million
- Owner: Nukissiorfiit

Power generation
- Units operational: 3 x 15 MW
- Nameplate capacity: 45 MW

External links
- Website: www.nukissiorfiit.gl

The Buksefjord hydroelectric power plant is the first and largest hydroelectric power plant in Greenland. It was built by Nuuk-Kraft and it is operated by Nukissiorfiit, Greenland's national energy company.

In 1984–85, Greenland's energy authority prepared a Greenland's hydroelectricity development program. At that time all electricity in Greenland was produced by oil based fuels, but there had been a sharp rise in oil prices in the preceding years. Construction of a plant in Buksefjord was proposed by a private consortium in 1988. In 1989, four companies were invited to a public tender. However, later it was decided that construction of the plant will be financed by the Home Rule of Greenland and the plant will be rented to Nuuk-Kraft consortium. Construction of the plant was approved by the Parliament of Greenland in 1990. It was commissioned in 1993.

The power station is situated 600 metres (2,000 ft) inside a mountain and it consists of 14 kilometres (8.7 mi) of tunnels. The upper reservoir, Kang Lake, is situated 249 metres (817 ft) above sea level at Buksefjord. Due to damming and deep inlet, it has a total effective volume of 1.9 cubic kilometres (0.46 cu mi), which is six times more than the annual water consumption by the plant. From the lake, a 10.5-kilometre (6.5 mi) long inlet pressure tunnel runs down to the plant.

Originally, the plant had two turbines with capacity of 15 MW each. In 2008, a third turbine with the same capacity was installed.

The generated power is transferred to Nuuk over the 57-kilometre (35 mi) long Buksefjord–Nuuk 132 kV power line, which includes the Ameralik Span, the world's longest span.

Nukissiorfiit plans to double the annual power output of the Buksefjord plant by 2029, as a result of increased demand in Nuuk. This involves a new 16-km-long transfer tunnel from the current intake at Lake Kangerluarssunnguup Tasersua to Lake Isortuarsuup Tasia as well as the construction of a new power station adjacent to the current one. This will add 71MW of capacity and greatly increase the available water. The project is planned to be tendered for construction in 2024.

== See also ==
- List of spans
