= Atuagkat Bookstore =

Bookstore in Nuuk, Greenland

Coordinates: 64°10′30″N 51°44′14″W

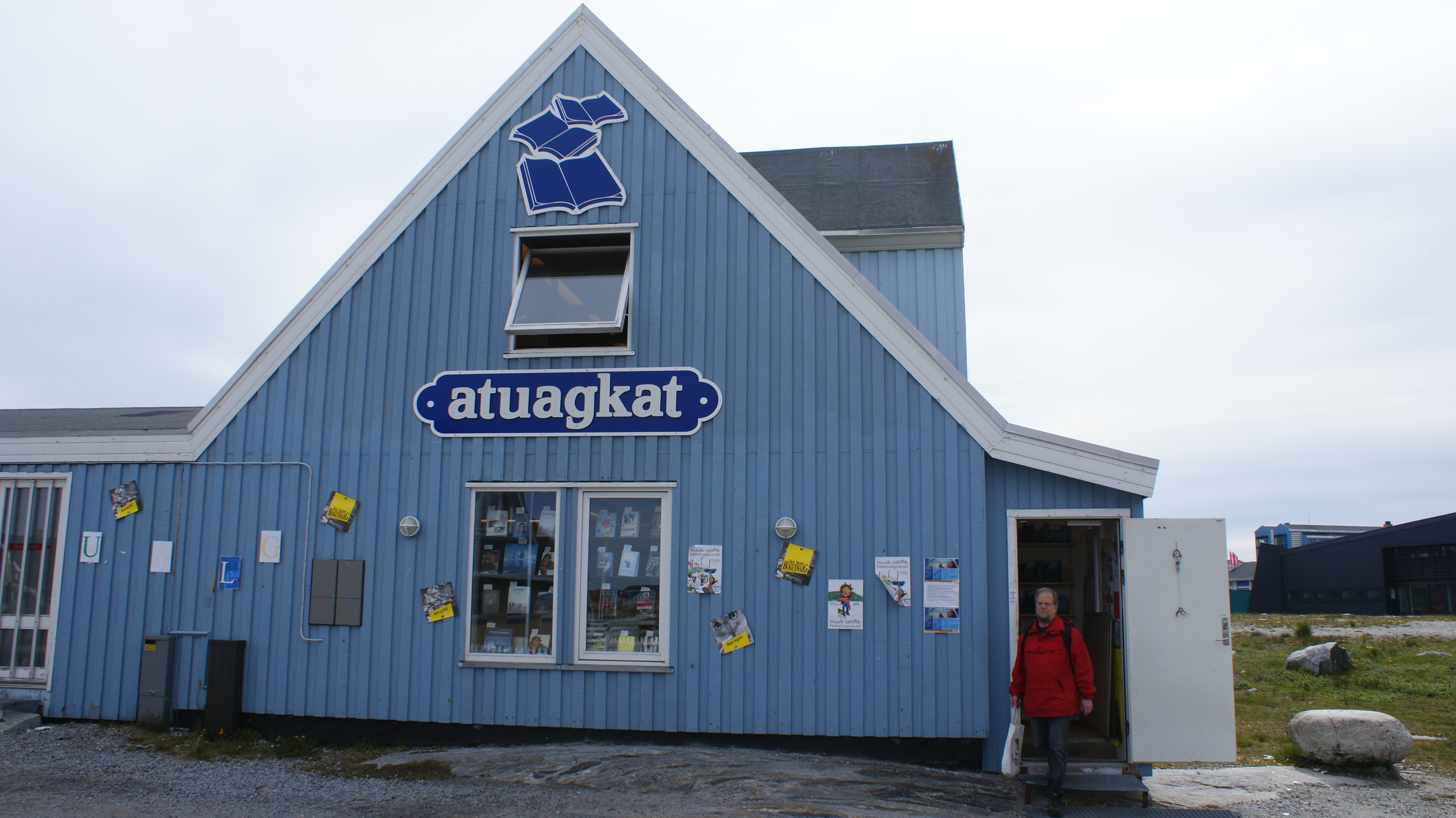
- Atuagkat building in the Nuuk Centrum
- Industry: Bookstore
- Founded: 5 May 1966
- Defunct: 15 January 2025; 17 months ago
- Headquarters: Nuuk, Greenland
- Area served: Greenland
- Key people: Dorthe and Claus Jordening
- Products: Books
- Website: atuagkat.com

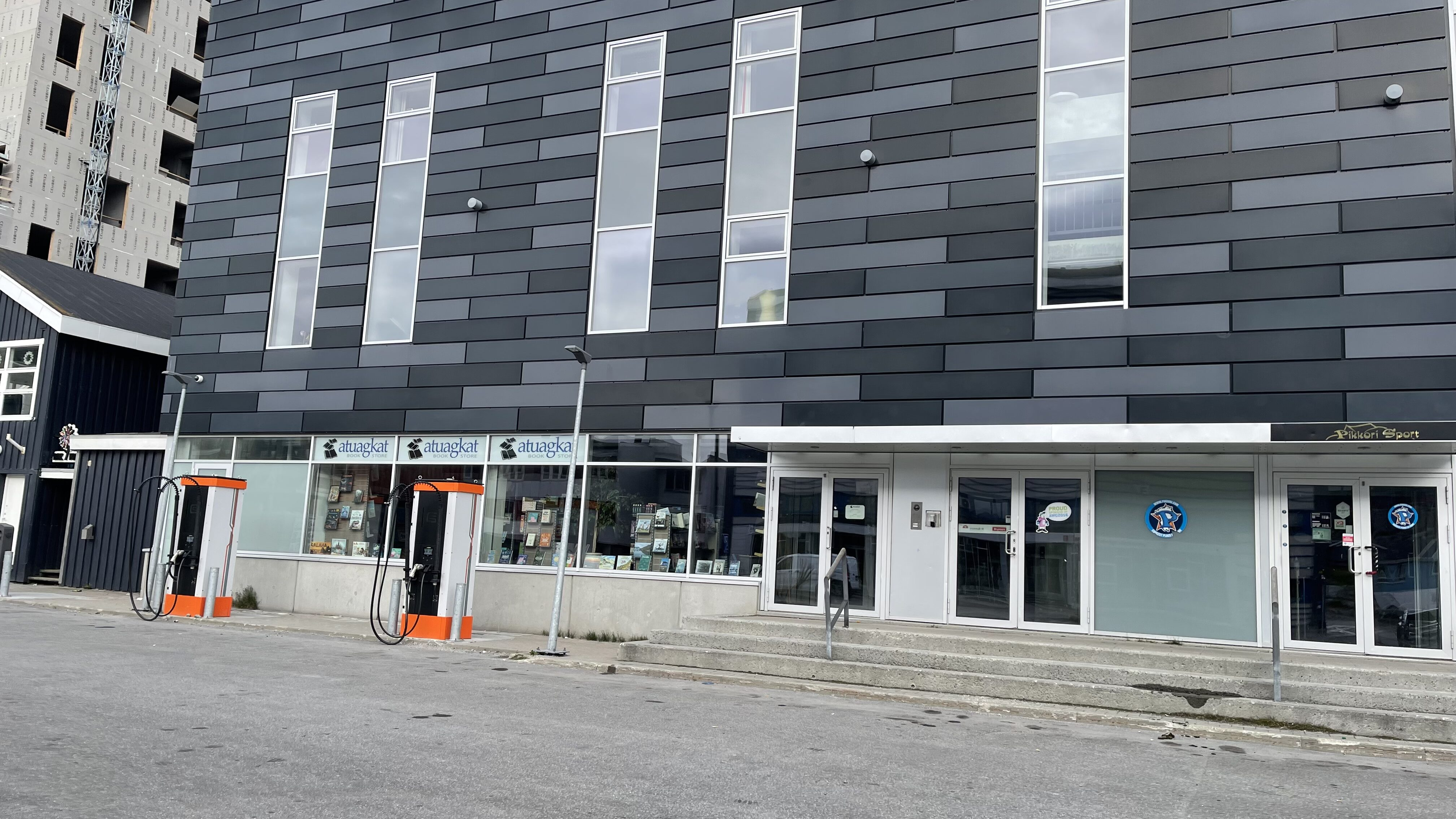
Atuagkat in 2023

Atuagkat Bookstore (Greenlandic for "books") was Greenland's only bookstore, located in the capital Nuuk.

Atuagkat Bookstore (colloquially Atuagkat) had a wide range of books within, among other things, fiction, biographies and memoirs, children's literature, English literature for young people, in addition to the world's largest collection of Groenlandica within the bookstore industry, including an extensive antiquarian collection of Greenlandic publications. Atuagkat also had a wide range of games, posters, and maps of Greenland.

Atuagkat was founded on 5 May 1966 and was Greenland's oldest bookstore. It closed on 15 January 2025.

== 1966–1985 ==
Atuagkat was founded by Det Grønlandske Forlag in 1966, with the aim that the profits from the book trade should cover the publisher's expenses for book publishing. Bent Elkjær Danielsen was employed as leading bookseller; he resigned in 1968. Poul Bay was employed as the new bookseller in 1968, and held the position until 1983.

== 1985–2005 ==
In 1985, Inger Hauge was given the position of leading bookseller and the following year she took over from the publisher, and Atuagkat Boghandel thus became the first Home Rule-owned company to pass into private hands. She ran Atuagkat Bookstore together with her husband, Steen Amandus, who owned Kontorteknik. The two companies were merged and run as Atuagkat & Kontorteknik until the turn of the millennium. In 1991, Atuagkat celebrated its 25th anniversary with an anniversary newspaper and with the performance of Dario Campeotto.

In 1999, it was decided to divide Atuagkat and Kontorteknik. The office department remained at the address, now run by Cuno Møller Jensen, Lennie Pedersen, and Jens Raage as Kontorhuset. In the meantime, Atuagkat moved with the book department into the little blue house on Imaneq, which many today still remember Atuagkat as.

Inger Hauge founded Forlaget Atuagkat in 1994, which she ran herself until 2017, when she chose to stop taking in new books due to her advanced age. The last book she published was "The Porous Poet and the Snow Sparrow" by Hans-Erik Rasmussen.

== 2005–2025 ==
In 2005, Claus and Dorthe Jordening approached about a share in the business. This led to a real generational change, with the couple taking over the bookstore, while Inger kept Forlaget Atuagkat. The Jordenings continued to run Atuagkat in the blue house until 2010, when the house, due to the Greenland Government's plans to build a shopping center and offices for the Greenlandic government. Atuagkat temporarily moved into the old Kamik building not far from the original location.

Atuagkat had a home here until 2012, when the Nuuk Center was ready. Atuagkat Bookstore closed in May and reopened in July as Atuagkat Bog & Idé in Nuuk Center. The room they moved into is in almost the same place as the blue house.

In 2015, Atuagkat chose to move out of Nuuk Center again, and in the same connection they left the chain Bog & Idé, and thus became Atuagkat Bookstore again. They moved into Aqqusinersuaq 4.

When the Jordenings decided to move to Denmark, they spent six months trying unsuccessfully to sell the bookstore, then closed it on 15 January 2025.
