= BANK of Greenland =

Commercial bank in Nuuk, Greenland

Coordinates: 64°10′31″N 51°44′19″W

GrønlandsBANKEN A/S
- Type: Aktieselskab
- Traded as: Nasdaq Copenhagen: GRLA
- ISIN: DK0010230630
- Industry: Financial services
- Founded: 1967
- Headquarters: Nuuk, Greenland
- Key people: Gunnar Í Liða (Chairman), Martin Kviesgaard (CEO)
- Products: Banking, insurance, investment management
- Net income: ▲DKK 326.5 million (2020)
- Total assets: ▲DKK 7.4 billion (2020)
- Number of employees: ▲136 (FTE, end 2020)
- Website: banken.gl

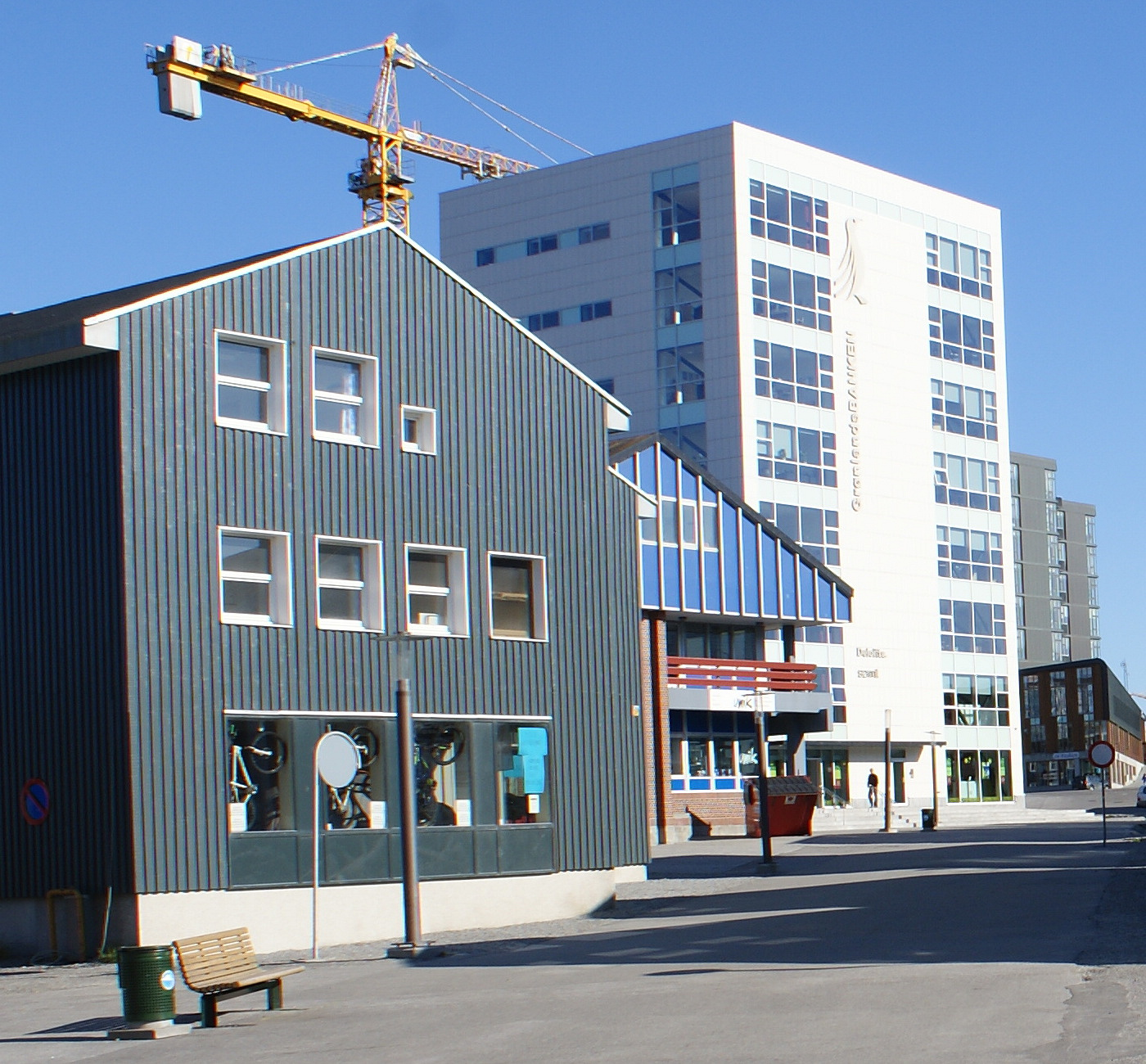
The bank's headquarters (right) are in the Nuuk Centrum.

The BANK of Greenland (Danish: GrønlandsBANKEN) is one of two commercial banks in Greenland. It is listed on the Copenhagen Stock Exchange as GRLA, with 2,700 shareholders in 2017. Headquartered in Nuuk, the bank had 118 employees in 2017.

== History ==
The Bank of Greenland was founded by a number of Danish banks on 26 May 1967, in the period when Greenland was a province of Denmark. The founding banks were Privatbanken, Danske Bank, Kjøbenhavns Handelsbank, and an organization of local banks, provincial and Copenhagen-based. Operations started in Nuuk on 1 July 1967, with branches in Ilulissat, Sisimiut, and Qaqortoq following in 1985, and in Maniitsoq in 1989.

It merged with Nuna Bank (formerly Bikuben) on 8 June 1985, with capital of 120 million Danish krone (DKK), retaining the name Grønlandsbanken, and becoming the only commercial bank in the country. Føroya Banki, which has its headquarters on the Faroe Islands, bought Sparbank's Greenland branches in 2010, and established itself as a competitor to the Bank of Greenland.

== Operations ==
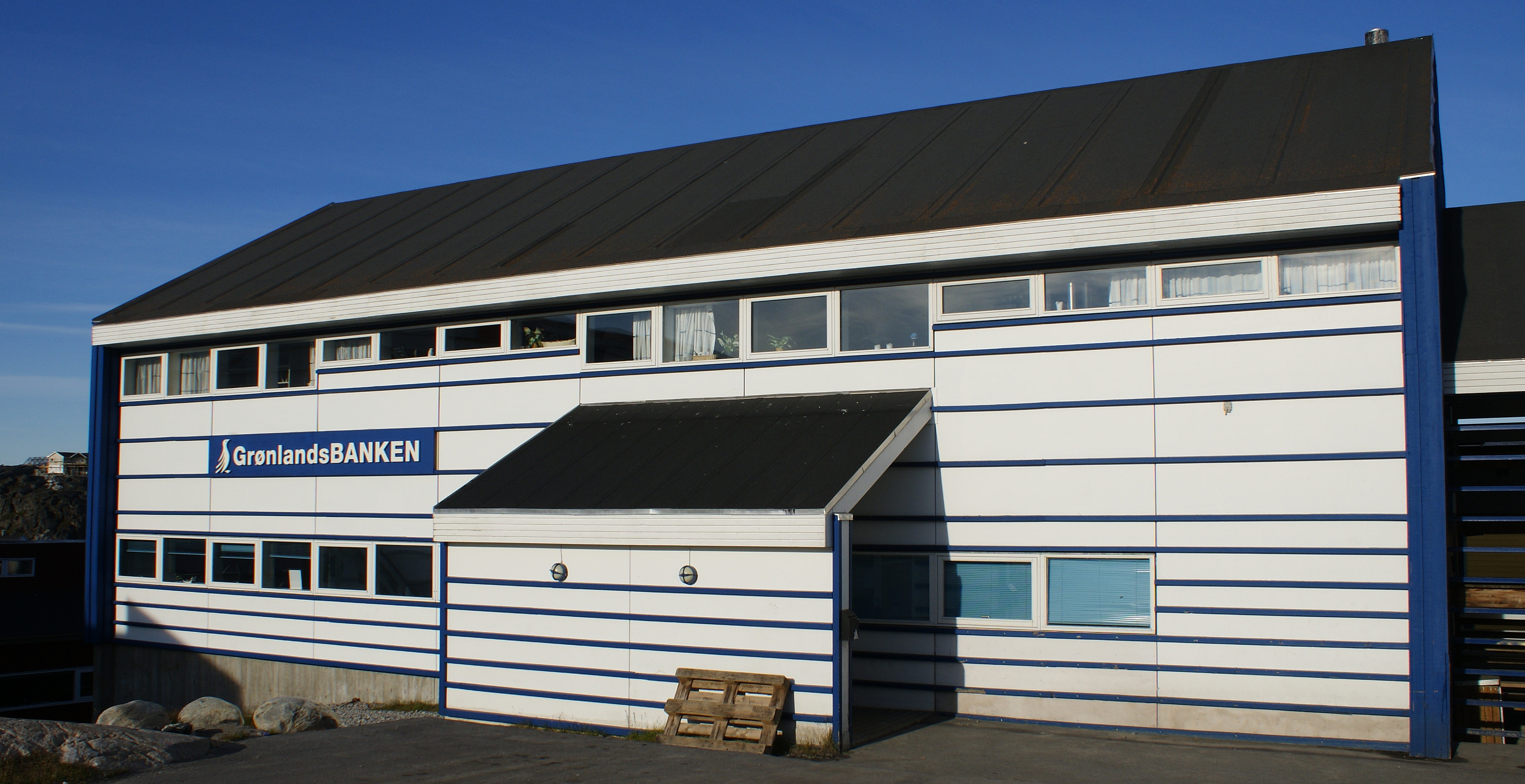
Ilulissat branch

The Bank of Greenland provides commercial services, as well as products and services for private customers such as loans, specialized and automated deposits,property trading, and administration. With 50,000 customers, the Bank of Greenland has branches in major towns in Greenland, while bank operations in small settlements are handled via the integrated Post Greenland offices in the Pilersuisoq all-purpose stores.

== See also ==
- Economy of Greenland
- List of banks in Greenland
- List of banks in Denmark
