= Nukissiorfiit =

Greenlandic energy company

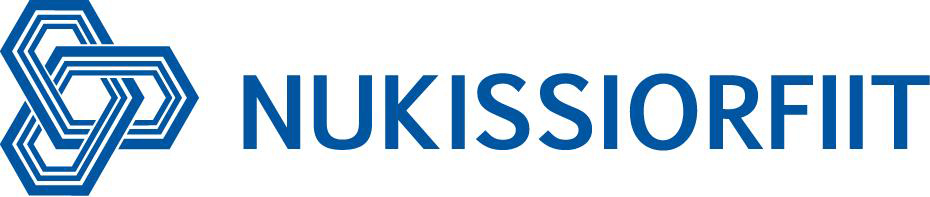

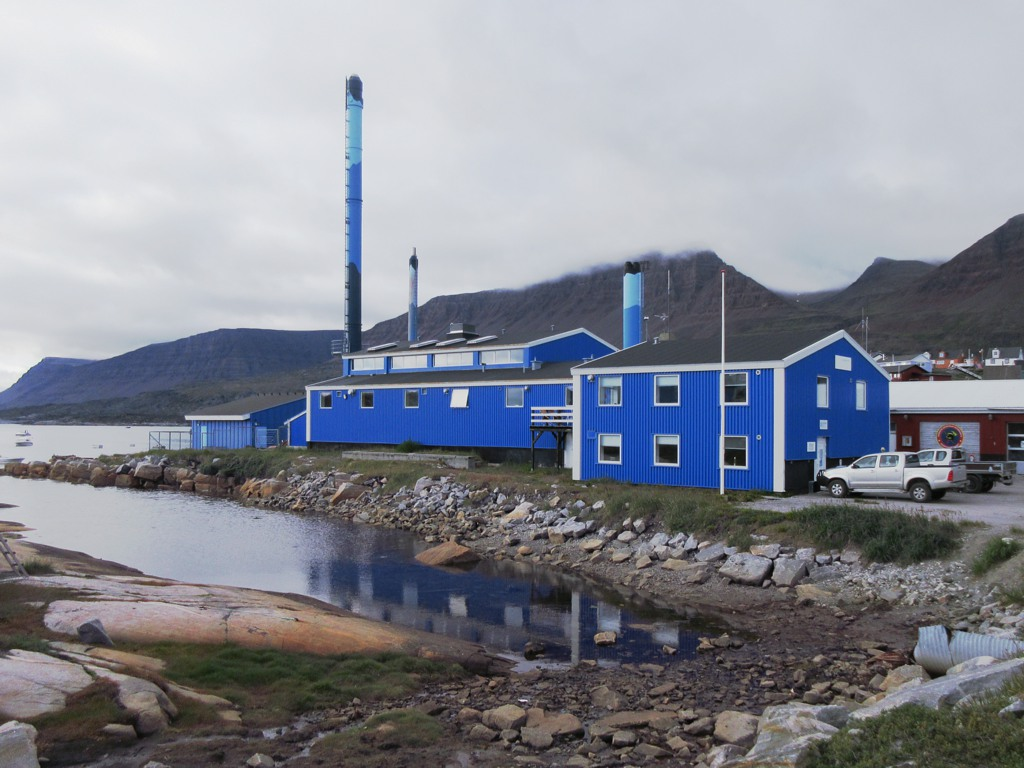
- Facility in Qeqertarsuaq
- Industry: Energy and tap water
- Predecessor: Grønlands Tekniske Organisation
- Founded: 1990
- Headquarters: Nuuk
- Area served: Greenland
- Number of employees: 388 (2021)
- Website: nukissiorfiit.gl

Nukissiorfiit is the state-owned national utility company responsible for supplying electricity, clean water, and heating to approximately 56,000 residents across 17 towns and 54 settlements in Greenland. Established in 1950 as the Greenland Technical Organization (GTO), the entity underwent several structural changes and rebrandings—including Nuna-Tek—before being officially renamed Nukissiorfiit in 1991 to consolidate public utility management. T

Nukissiorfiit currently generates 72% of its energy from renewable resources, primarily hydropower, and is actively on track to achieve a completely fossil-free, 100% green energy infrastructure by 2030.

== History ==
The company started in 1950 with the creation of the Greenland Technical Organization (GTO), a Danish government department that assumed water supply duties in 1959 and gained state-owned status in 1985. The enterprise was transferred to the Naalakkersuisut in 1987 and rebranding as Nuna-Tek orr Nunatsinni Teknikkikut Ingerlatsivik. In 1991, the entity was officially renamed Nukissiorfiit Greenland’s Energy Supplyconsolidating the management of public electricity, water, and heat across the territory.

Throughout the 1990s, Nukissiorfiit streamlined its focus, halting external installation services in towns with private contractors by 1994 and absorbing all municipal settlement utility grids by 1998. The company centralized its operations in 2003 by moving its head office to Issortarfimmut 3 in Nuuk. In 2006, the company officially dropped its secondary English subtitle to be known solely as Nukissiorfiit, operating today as an entity that manages utility networks for 17 towns and 54 settlements.

== Profile ==
It is a government-owned utility company responsible for supplying Greenland with electricity, heat, and clean water. The company serves 56,000 Nukissiorfiit delivers utility services at one-third the cost of comparable remote regions in Canada. The company currently generates 72% of its total energy from renewable resources, such as hydropower, and isplanning track to achieve a completely fossil-free 100% green energy infrastructure by the year 2030.

== Plan to build hydro power plant ==
There is a lot of potential yet unbuilt hydro power. However the rugged terrain, the fjords and the usually short distance between the ice sheet and fjords means there are many short small rivers, meaning benefit per power plant is smaller. A port and a road must be built for each one. In the winter rivers are frozen, so dams are needed to create water flow during winter. Sometimes power lines must cross fjords with spans like the Ameralik Span, the world's longest span. This means that costs are high and therefore there was a lot of hesitation on replacing oil fired power plants with hydropower. Rising oil prices supported decision to build more hydro power plants.

== List of hydroelectric power plants ==
Name	Settlements served	Power	Opening year
Buksefjord hydroelectric power plant	Nuuk	45 MW	1993
Tasiilaq hydropower plant	Tasiilaq	1.2 MW	2005
Qorlortorsuaq Dam	Qaqortoq Narsaq	7.6 MW	2007
Sisimiut Hydro Power Plant	Sisimiut	15 MW	2010
Ilulissat Hydropower plant	Ilulissat	22.5 MW	2014
