= Ameralik Span =

World's longest span of electrical overhead line

The Ameralik Span is the longest span of an electrical overhead power line in the world. It is situated near Nuuk on Greenland and crosses Ameralik fjord with a span width of 5,376 m (17,638 ft) at 64°6′18″N 51°14′16″W. It was built in 1993 by the Norwegian company NTE Entreprise (Nord-Trøndelag Elektrisitetsverk) and is part of a single-circuit 132 kV powerline running from Buksefjord hydroelectric power plant to Nuuk.

The span consists of four 40-millimeter diameter steel conductors, one of which is a spare. The span has a width of 190 metres and a minimum clearance of 128 metres. The pylons on each side of the span carry only one conductor each and are situated on mountains 444 metres high on the north shore and 1,013 metres high on the south shore. It is designed to withstand the cold winters of Greenland, so electricity produced can reach consumers without any disturbance.

== Sites ==
=== North End ===
- Tower 1: 64°6′45″N 51°14′59″W
- Tower 2: 64°6′45″N 51°14′55″W
- Tower 3: 64°6′46″N 51°14′51″W
- Tower 4: 64°6′46″N 51°14′45″W

=== South End ===
- Tower 1: 64°4′11″N 51°11′57″W
- Tower 2: 64°4′12″N 51°11′54″W
- Tower 3: 64°4′13″N 51°11′50″W
- Tower 4: 64°4′14″N 51°11′46″W

== See also ==
- List of spans
