= Pilersuisoq =

State-owned general store chain in Greenland

- Company type: Division
- Industry: Retail; Public services
- Headquarters: Sisimiut, Greenland
- Area served: Greenland
- Key people: Lars Behrendt
- Parent: KNI
- Website: pilersuisoq.gl

Pilersuisoq is a chain of all-purpose general stores in Greenland, a major division of the state-owned KNI conglomerate. Like its parent company, it is based in Sisimiut (Holsteinsborg), the second-largest town in Greenland.

Lars Behrendt is the administrative director of the company since 2008.

== Operations ==
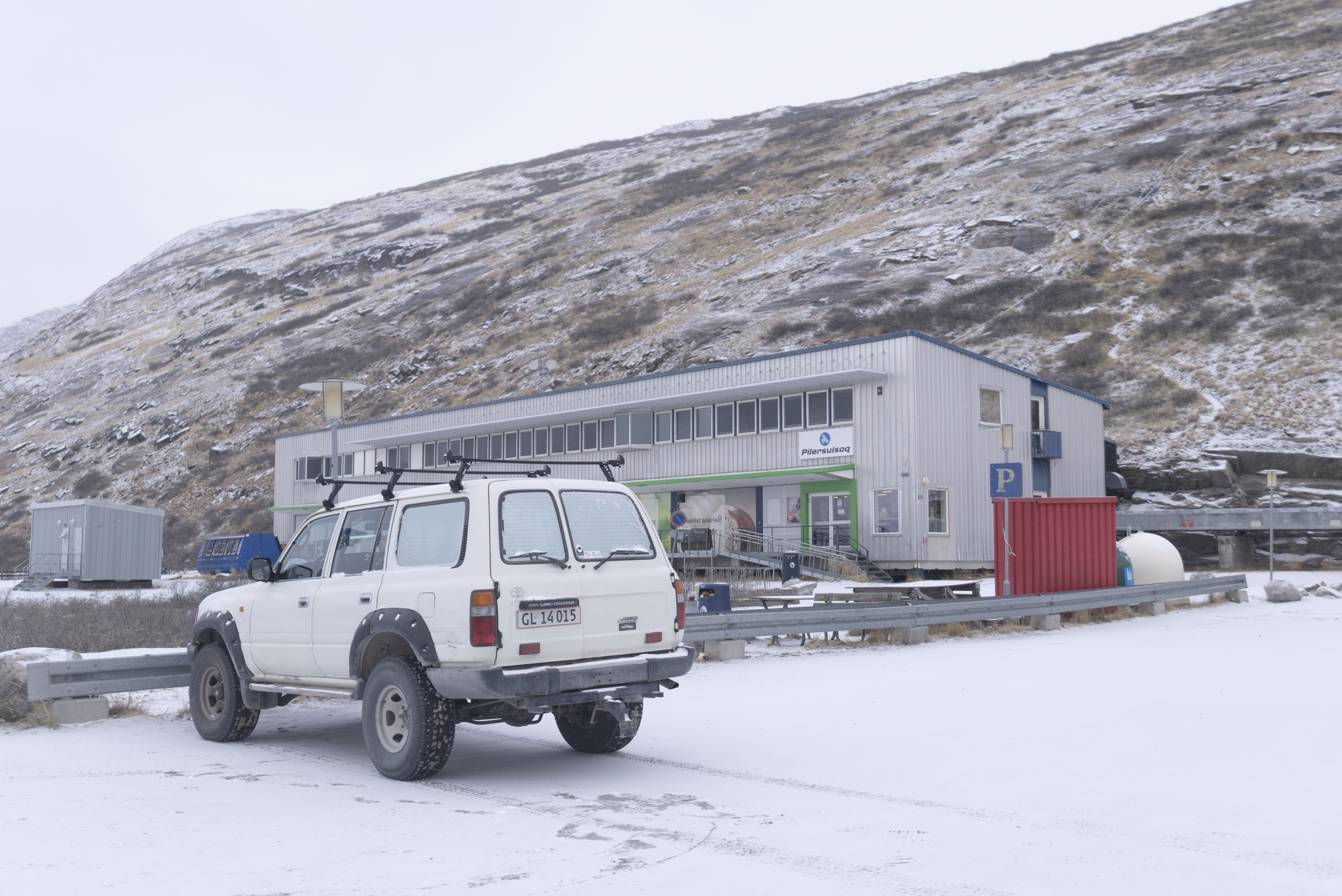
Pilersuisoq Supermarket in Kangerlussuaq

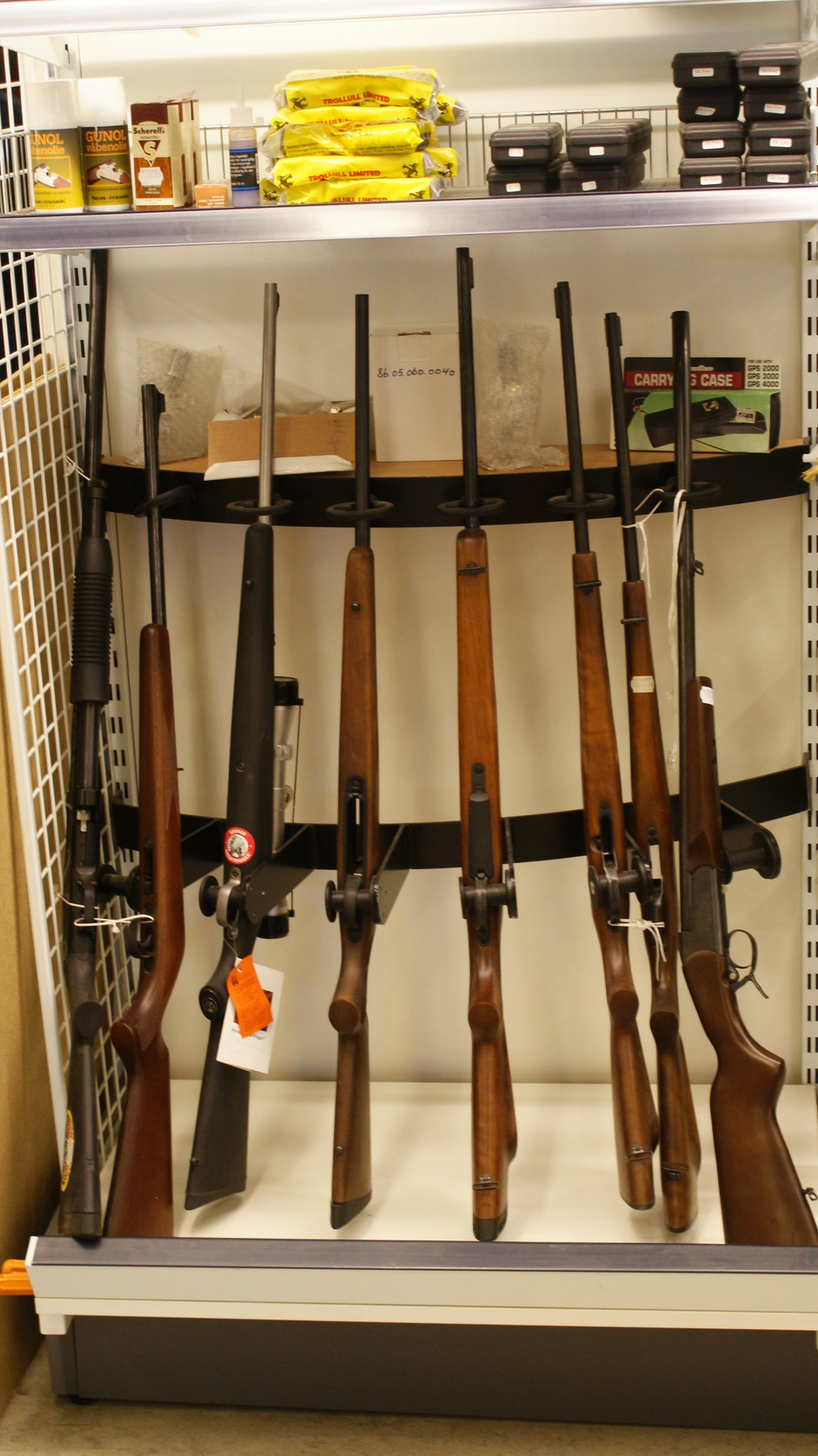
Hunting rifles on display in a Pilersuisoq store in Ukkusissat.

The chain operates 64 outlets in all small settlements in the country, as well as smaller towns which are not, except for Aasiaat, covered by the Pisiffik or Brugsen supermarket chains. The stores in remote settlements are supplied by Royal Arctic Line but the intervals between the shipments are long, with some settlements like Ittoqqortoormiit and Qaanaaq only served twice a year.

=== Post and banking ===
Pilersuisoq stores have an integrated Post Greenland office, the employees of which also process bank operations on behalf of the Bank of Greenland.

=== Duty-free ===
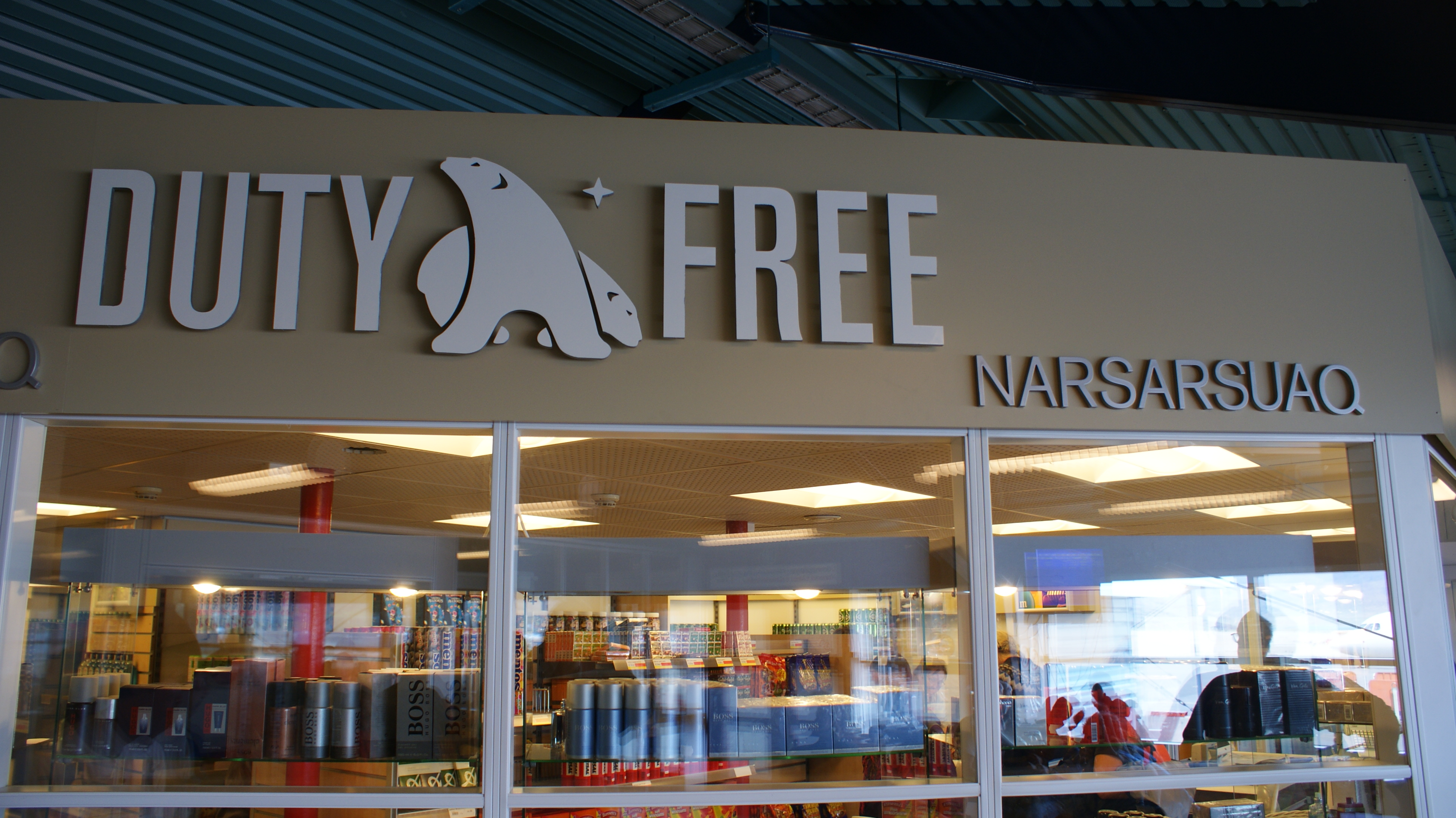
Nanoq duty-free store at Narsarsuaq Airport.

Pilersuisoq also operates the duty-free stores at the Kangerlussuaq Airport and Narsarsuaq Airport, although as of August 2010 the future of all duty-free stores in Greenland (including a stand at Kulusuk Airport) is uncertain due to budget cuts considered by the Government of Greenland. By 2013 the pre-2010 rules regarding duty-free sales had been restored.

=== District heliports ===
Passenger check-in for Air Greenland helicopter flights from the settlement heliports is performed by Pilersuisoq employees at the local store, in the Post Greenland counter. The passenger does not receive a boarding pass, but the baggage is tagged, unless the passenger does not connect in a local helicopter hub. Baggage is transported in a tractor, quad or snowscooter between the heliport and Pilersuisoq store.

== See also ==
- KNI A/S or Greenland Trade, its parent company
  - Polaroil, the other major division
- Pisiffik A/S, a competing brand formerly part of KNI as well
- Royal Greenland Trading Department, KNI's Danish forebear
