= BankNordik =

Financial services company

- Industry: Financial services
- Founded: 1906
- Headquarters: Tórshavn, Faroe Islands
- Key people: Stine Bosse (Chairman)
- Products: Banking, insurance
- Net income: ▲ (DKK 227 million) (2016)
- Total assets: DKK 15.5 billion (2016)
- Total equity: DKK 1.9 billion (2016)
- Number of employees: 415 (FTE, 2009)
- Website: www.banknordik.com

Føroya Banki (English: Bank of the Faroe Islands) is a Faroe Islands-based financial services company that provides banking and insurance services. It also provides some services in Greenland as Bankivik. It is one of the two full-service banking firms in the Faroe Islands. The bank's services cover 40% of the market share in the Faroe Islands.

== History ==
It was founded as Føroya Banki in 1906. In February 2010 it acquired twelve branches of Sparbank in Denmark and Greenland (two branches in the latter). It then changed its name to BankNordik to reflect its new market reach. In 2011 the bank acquired some assets of Amagerbanken. It sold its Danish business in 2021 and changed its name back to Føroya Banki in March 2024. It renamed its Greenlandic business to Bankivik in November 2024.

== See also ==
- List of banks in Denmark
