= Pisiffik =

Large chain of Greenlandic stores

Pisiffik A/S
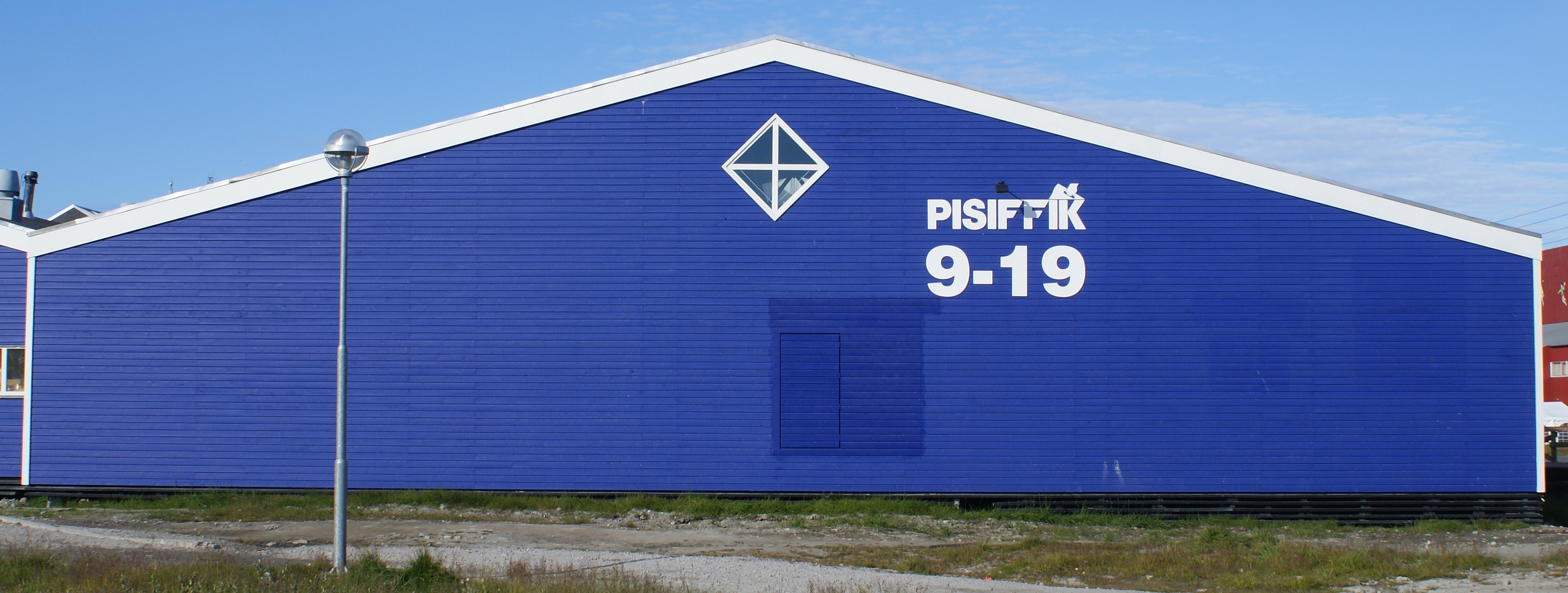
- Company type: Aktieselskab
- Industry: Retail
- Founded: 2001
- Headquarters: Nuuk, Greenland
- Area served: Greenland
- Key people: Per Steen Larsen (CEO)
- Revenue: DKK 925 million
- Net income: DKK 51 million
- Number of employees: 623–650
- Subsidiaries: KK Engros
- Website: pisiffik.gl

Pisiffik A/S is the largest privately owned commercial retail company in Greenland, operating approximately 40 stores across the nation's six largest towns: Nuuk, Sisimiut, Ilulissat, Aasiaat, Maniitsoq, and Qaqortoq. Originally established in 1993 as a non-subsidized subsidiary of the state-owned KNI conglomerate, the company was fully privatized in 2001 and later relocated its corporate headquarters from Sisimiut to Nuuk in 2016. Today, Pisiffik manages a diverse portfolio of retail chains and international franchises spanning supermarkets, clothing, electronics, fast food, and furniture including brands such as SPAR, Akiki, JYSK, Elgiganten, ILVA, and Sunset Boulevard as well as the food wholesaler KK Engros.

== History ==
Pisiffik was first established in 1993 as KNI Pisiffik A/S, a subsidiary of Greenland's KNI conglomerate. Located in Greenland's larger towns, it was an experiment in running the stores without a government subsidy, while KNI Pilersuisoq continued to operate the more distant and less profitable outposts. The present Pisiffik A/S was spun off as a separate company in 2001 when Danish company Dagrofa bought Pisiffik as part of a privatization of parts of KNI. Dagrofa sold its shares to the current owners in 2015. In 2016, the headquarters were moved from Sisimiut to Nuuk.

== Operations ==
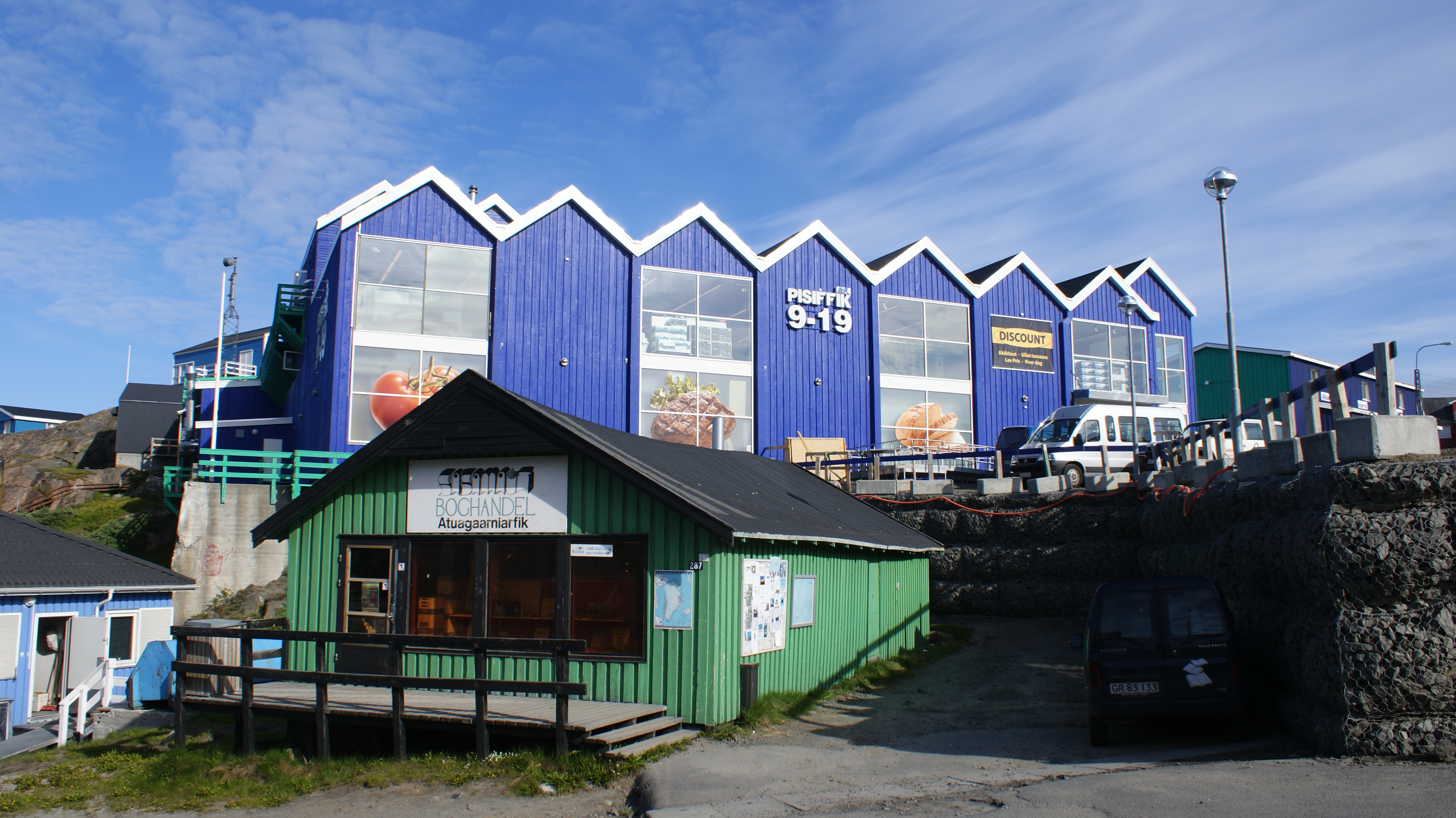
Pisiffik supermarket in Sisimiut.

Pisiffik's approximately 40 stores are found in the six largest towns in Greenland: Aasiaat, Ilulissat, Maniitsoq, Nuuk, Qaqortoq, and Sisimiut.

=== Brands ===
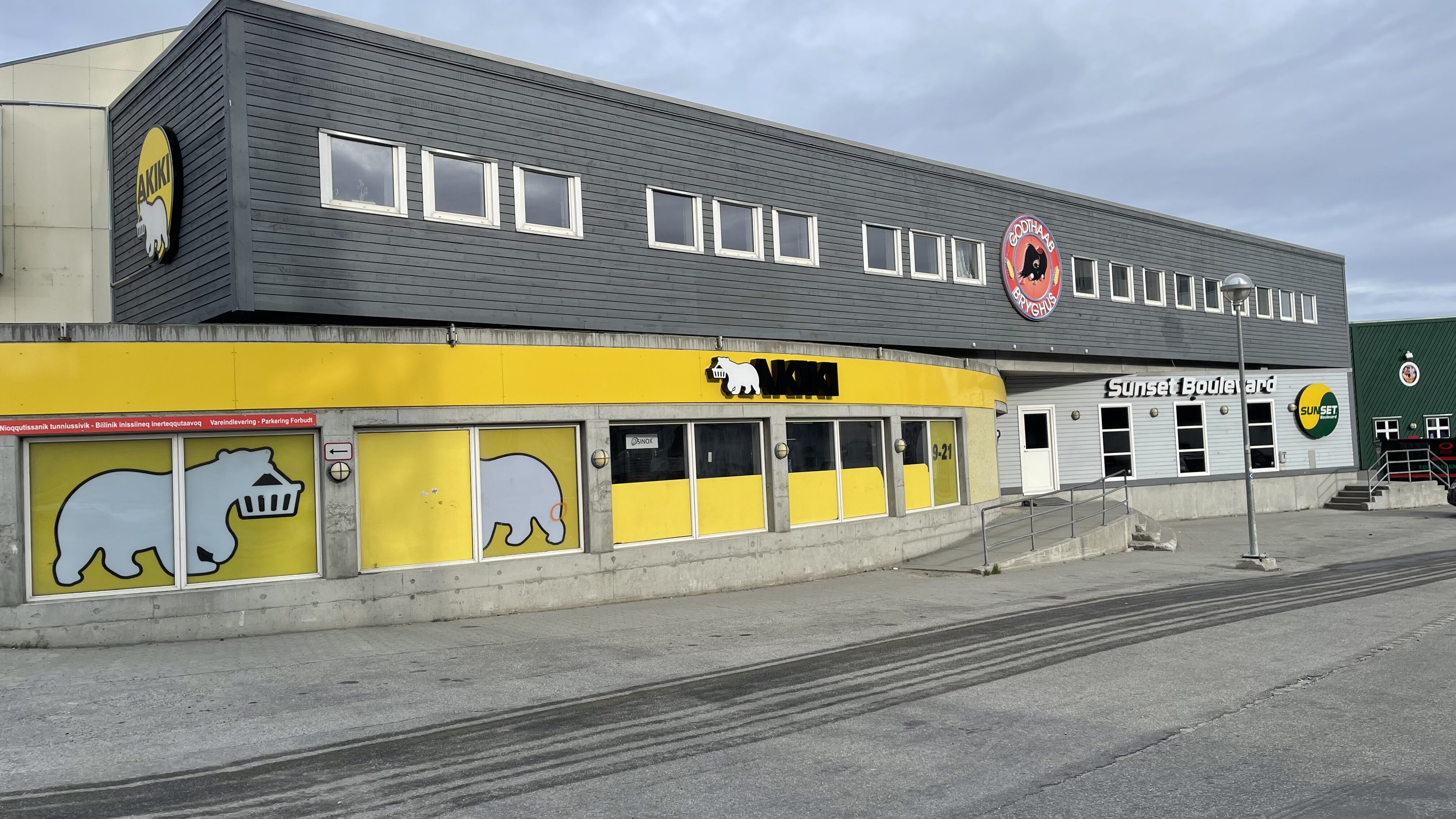
Pisiffik-owned restaurant and grocery store in Nuuk

Pisiffik operates the following brands:

- Pisiffik - Supermarkets
- SPAR - Grocery stores
- Akiki - Discount store
- Pisattat - Consumer electronics stores
- Torrak Fashion - Clothing stores
- JYSK - Furniture stores
- Elgiganten - Consumer electronics stores
- Nota Bene - Consumer electronics store in Nuuk
- ILVA - Furniture store
- Sunset Boulevard - Fast-food restaurants
- SuKu - Home decor stores

Pisiffik also owns wholesaler KK Engros.
