= Aqqusinersuaq =

Street in Nuuk, Greenland

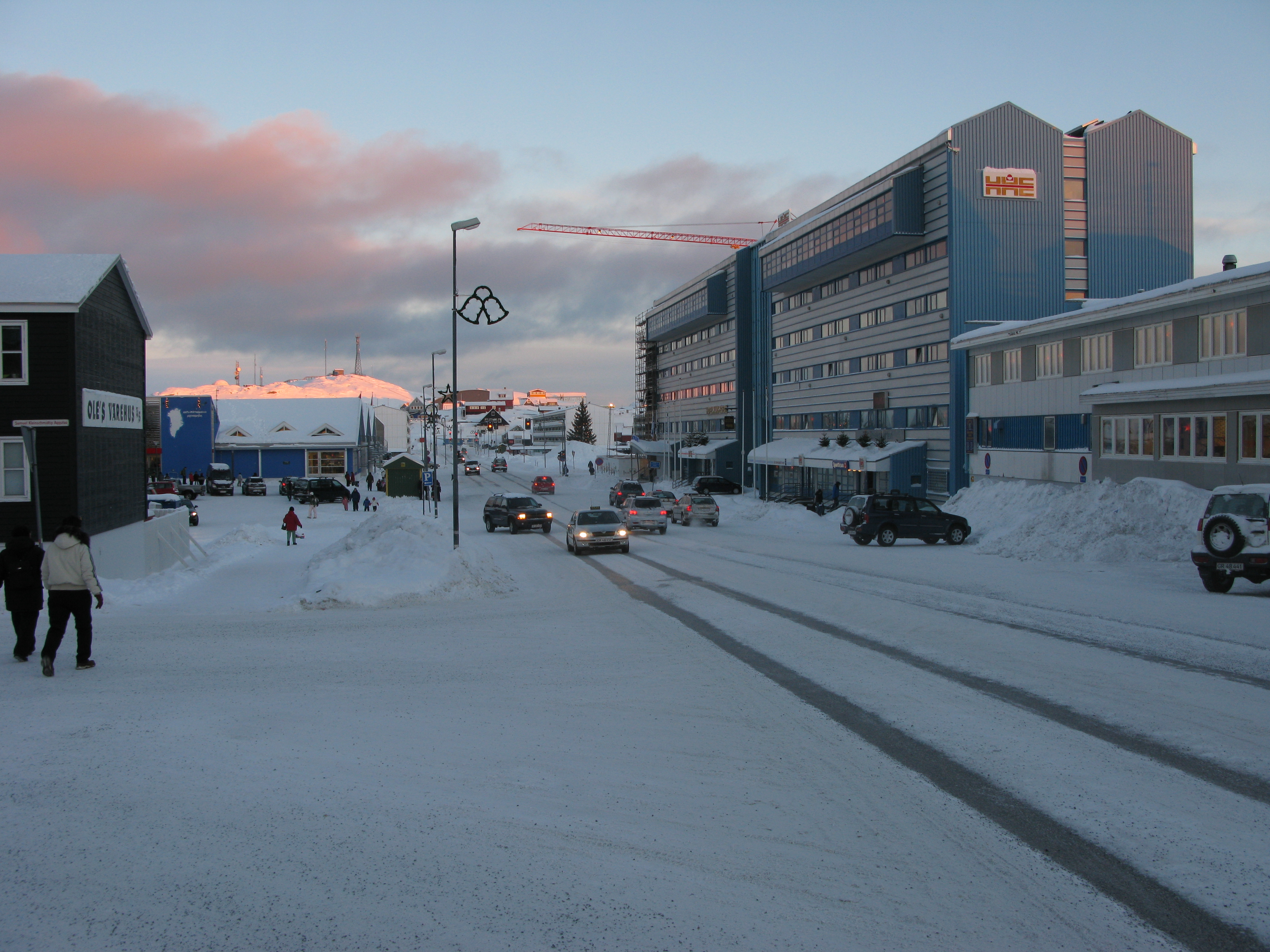
Aqqusinersuaq with Hotel Hans Egede visible on the right

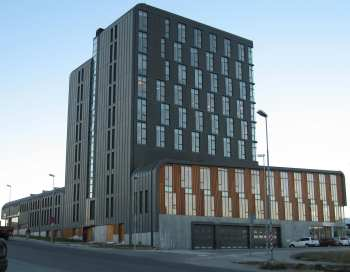
Teletårnet (of the TELE Greenland Group) office tower alongside Aqqusinersuaq

Aqqusinersuaq is a major street in Nuuk, Greenland. The 1.8 kilometres (1.1 mi) street runs through the City Centre with one lane in either direction. It begins at the Nuuk Port and Harbour heading south and turns north at Sipisaq Kujalleq and then northwest at 400-talik roundabout (where it meets Eqalugalinnguit) and ends when it meets HJ Rinksvej Aqqutaa.

The road runs through Nuuk's business centre, and many of the city's major landmarks are located along or nearby the street such as Hotel Hans Egede, Nuuk's City Hall (Nuuk Rådhus), and the Bank of Greenland. Aqqusinersuaq also housed Blok P, a notorious apartment building that was demolished in 2012.
