= Hotel Arctic =

Hotel Arctic may refer to:

- Hotel Arctic (Greenland)
- Hotel Arctic (Murmansk)
