= Nuussuaq (district) =

District of Nuuk, the capital of Greenland

Coordinates: 64°11′10″N 51°42′20″W

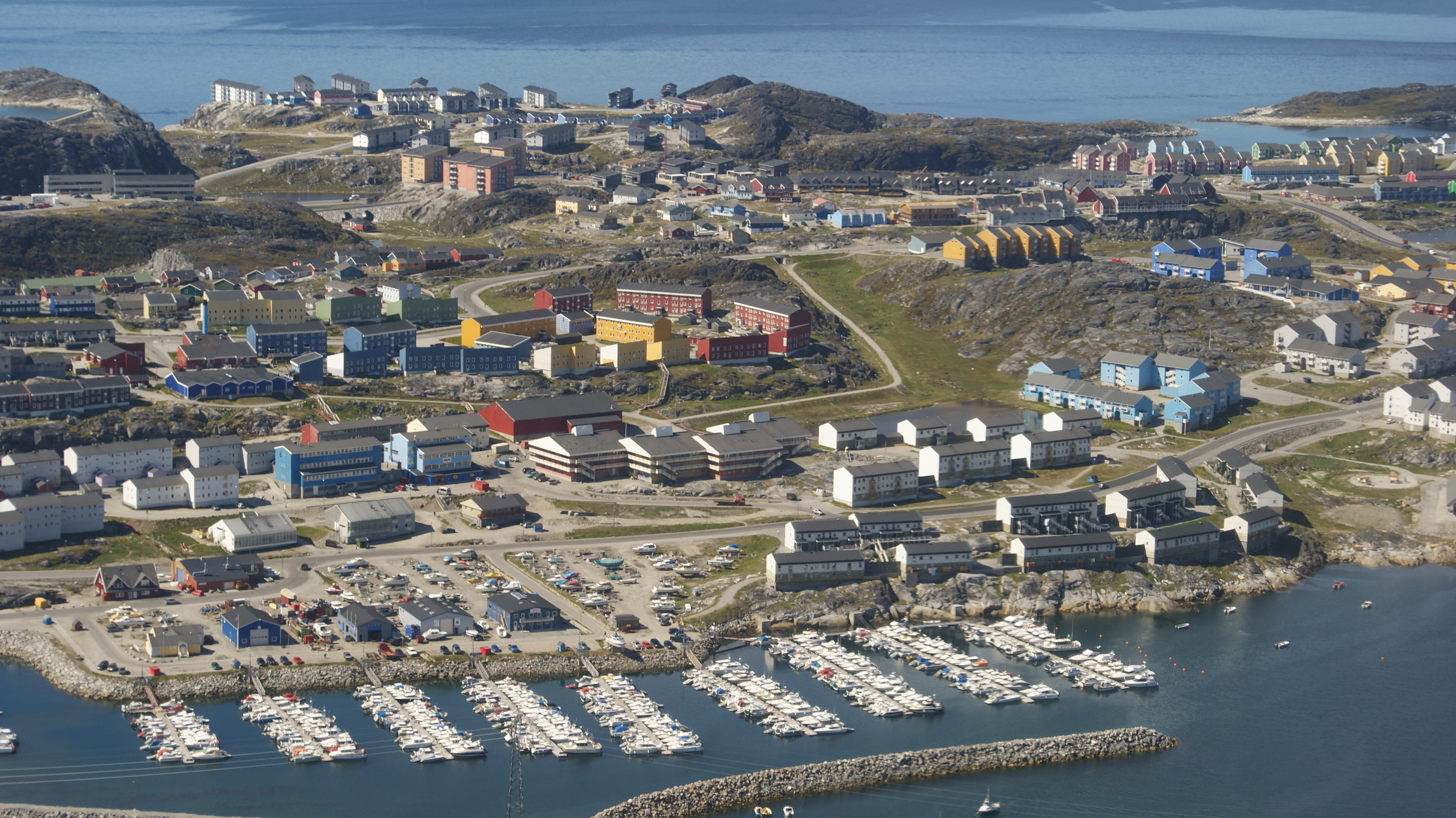
Aerial view of Nuussuaq from the east

Nuussuaq is a district of Nuuk, the capital of Greenland, It is located in the northern part of the city, west and southwest of Nuuk Airport, approximately 4 km (2.5 mi) outside the city center.

== History ==
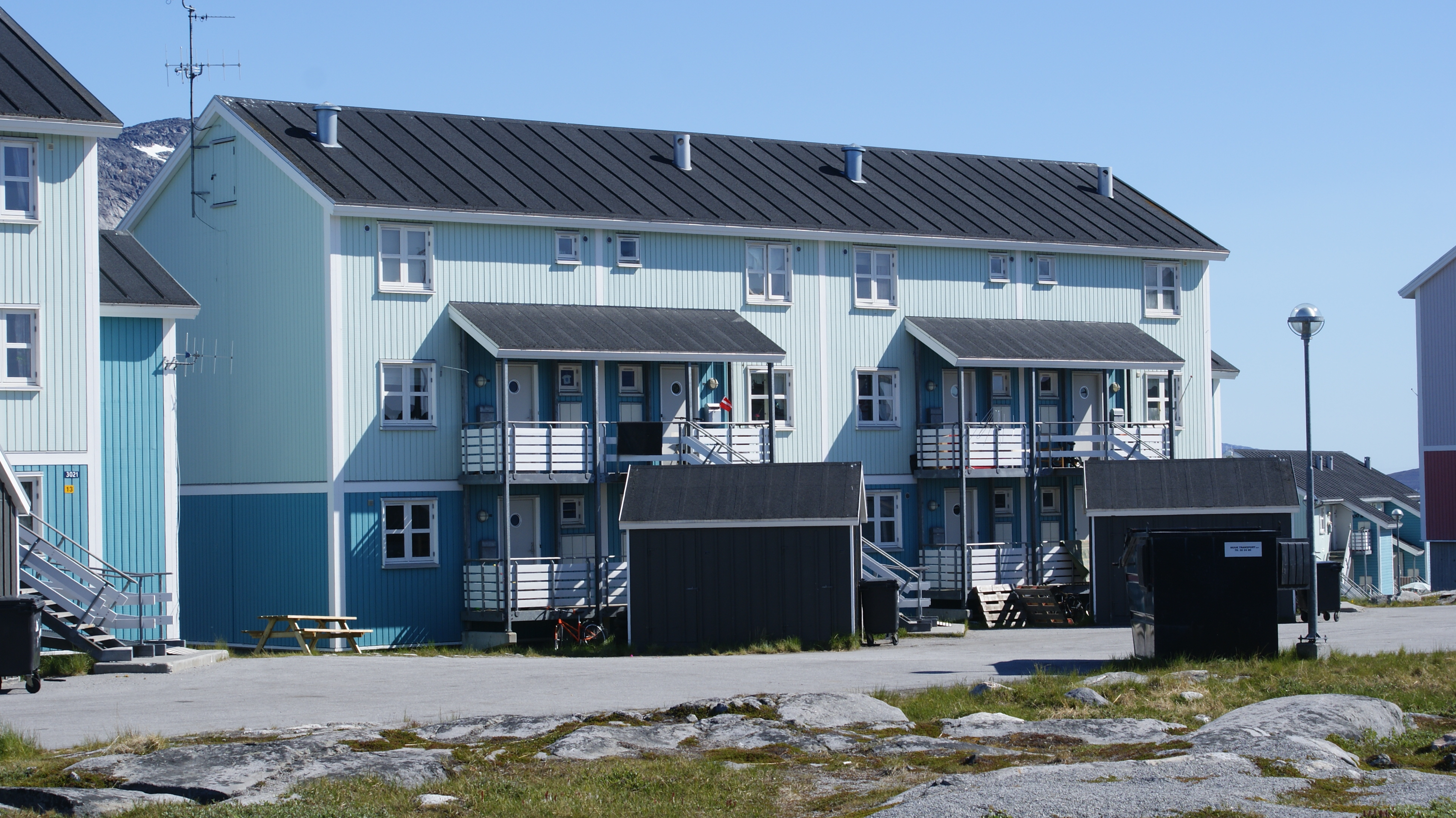
Modern housing in Nuussuaq

The district was established in the late 1970s, and has rapidly expanded since then, becoming the most populated neighborhood home to the majority of apartment buildings in the city and approximately 6.000 people. After Qinngorput, it is the newest district of Nuuk, expanding northwards towards the airport.

== Infrastructure ==
The campus of the University of Greenland, hosting Statistics Greenland, and the main holdings of the Public and National Library of Greenland is located at the northern end of the district, near the road to the airport.

== Transport ==
Nuup Bussii operates a bus route (route 2) between Nuussuaq and Nuuk Bycenter. During rush hours, another bus (route E2 and X2) shuttles also every 15 minutes between the neighbourhood and downtown. School buses used to drive from the school in Qiterlia to Nuussuaq. Buses 1 and 3 drive via the main road that divides Nuussuaq from other neighbourhoods.
