= Quassussuup Tungaa =

District of Nuuk, Greenland

Coordinates: 64°11′30″N 51°42′40″W

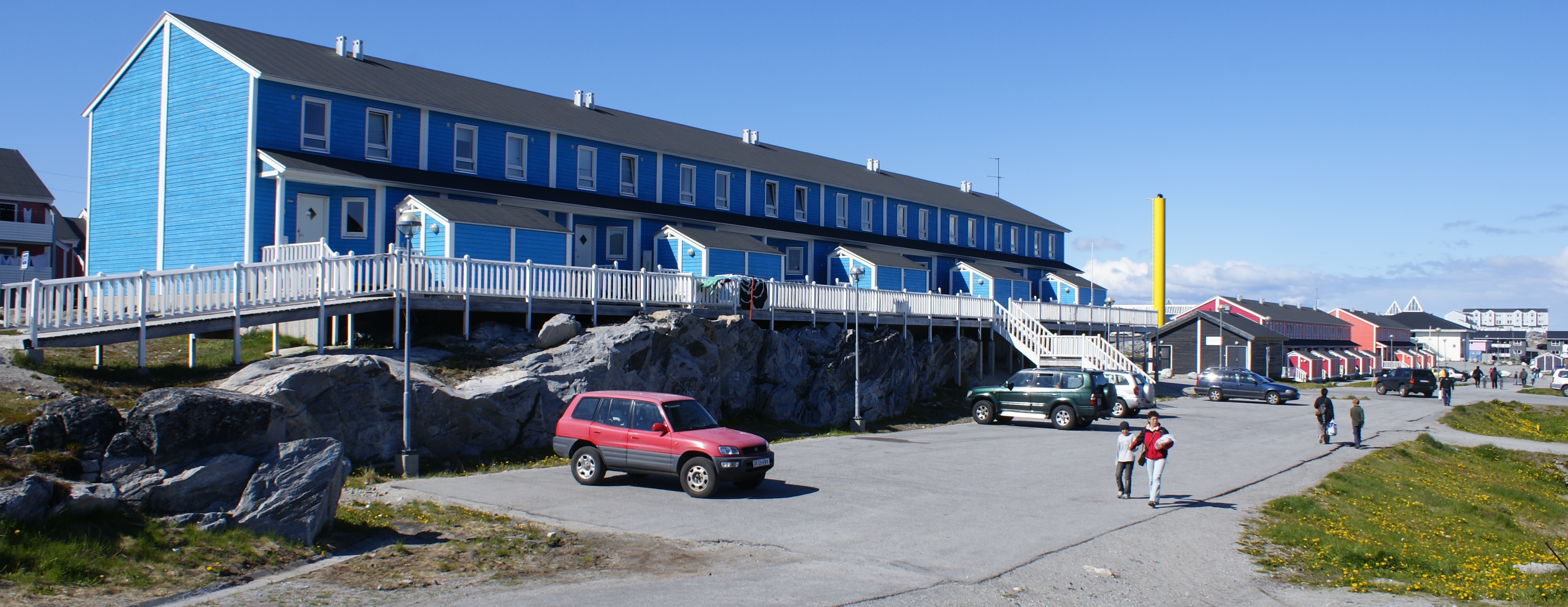
Quassussuup Tungaa

Quassussuup Tungaa is a district of Nuuk, the capital of Greenland. Together with the Qernertunnguit neighborhood, it is located in the northwestern part of the town, facing the Nuup Kangerlua fjord.

== Transport ==
Nuup Bussii provides bus services linking the district to the Nuuk Centrum.
