= Qinngorput =

District of Nuuk, the capital of Greenland

Coordinates: 64.1737°N 51.667°W

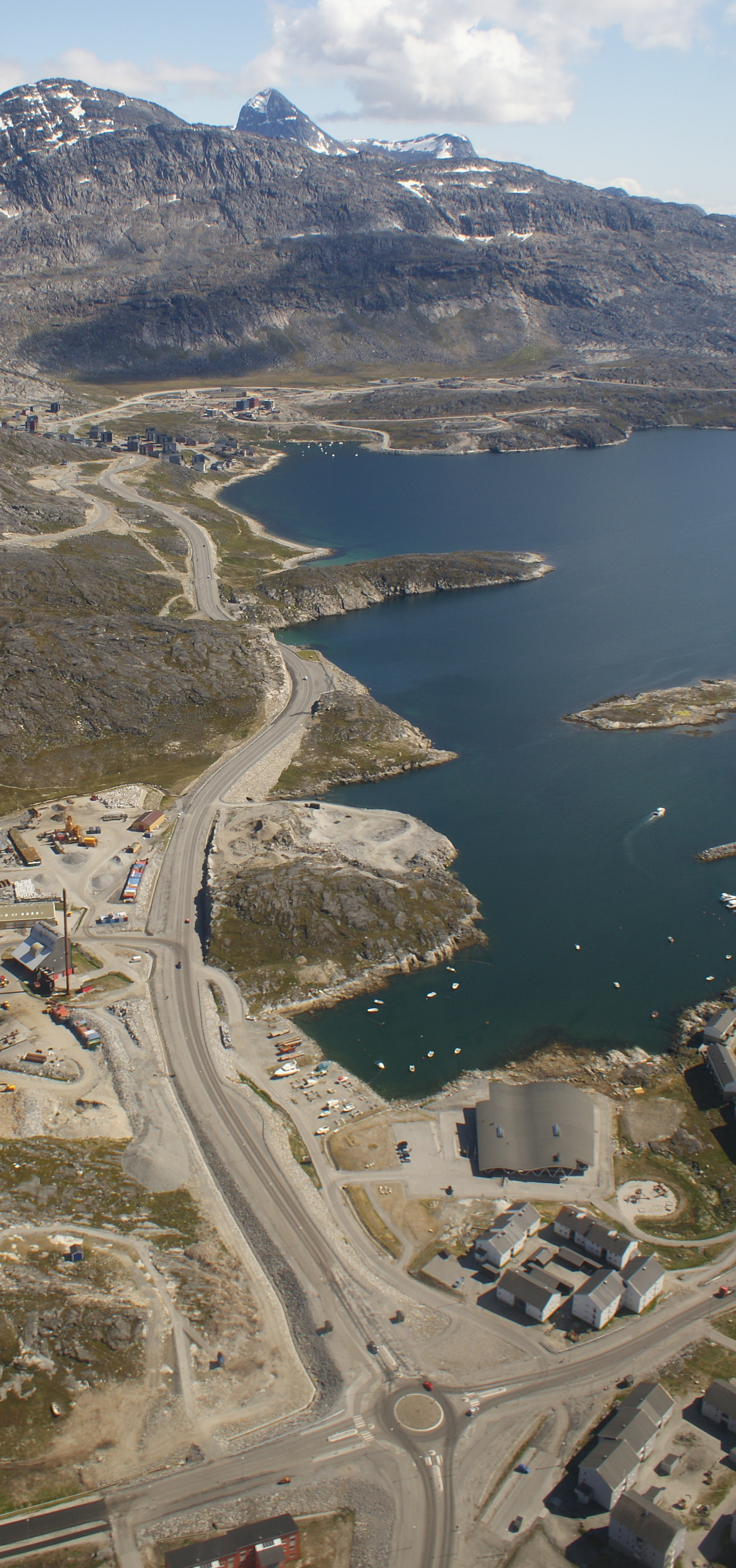
Aerial view of the road to Qinngorput

Qinngorput is a district of Nuuk, the capital of Greenland. It was incorporated into the city in 2005. Qinngorput is located to the east and northeast of the Nuuk Centrum district and south of Nuuk Airport, approximately 5 km (3.1 mi) outside of the city centre.

Originally a popular area for hunting and camping, Qinngorput was developed as part of Nuuk’s modern urban planning strategy to accommodate the city’s growth. The neighborhood has attracted a predominantly young population, with a particular focus on families with school-aged children, making it the youngest district in terms of average age in the city.

Although still sparsely populated, there are plans for 1,200 apartments and a long-term capacity of up to 10,000 inhabitants. The majority of housing is privately owned, and new developments continue to rise along the southeastern shores of Malenebugten.

In response to the dismantling of the dilapidated Blok P housing complex in central Nuuk, many displaced tenants were offered new accommodation in Qinngorput, although some expressed concerns over higher living costs and limited transportation options. The area has since seen significant infrastructure improvements, including the establishment of Hans Lynge School in 2011, the opening of a grocery store, and the development of parks and playgrounds. Enhanced connectivity was achieved with the 2008 completion of a road linking Qinngorput to central Nuuk, and bus services operated by Nuup Bussii now run frequently, facilitating regular commutes to other parts of the city.

== History ==
The Qinngorput area was a popular camping and hunting site for many years before it was incorporated into Nuuk in 2005. Being the most recent district incorporated with the city, it attracts younger people and the focus is on families with school-aged children. This is reflected in the demographics; it has on average the youngest population of all Nuuk districts. Qinngorput does not have many inhabitants, less than 200, but the number of buildings is steadily growing. When finished the area will consist of 1,200 apartments, with a planned potential capacity of 10,000 inhabitants, if needed. The latest expansion of the district is along the south-eastern shores of Malenebugten, with 300 new apartments to be handed over in August 2013.

The district is the newest neighbourhood of the growing city; the entire area consists of buildings erected since the mid-1990s and is a part of the new Nuuk city planning strategy. The overwhelming majority of the housing in the district is privately owned. The nearby Nuussuaq district was likewise purposefully erected in the late 1980s in order to minimize auxiliary city costs, stemming from infrastructural investments such as plumbing, power grids, and communications.

== Recent developments ==
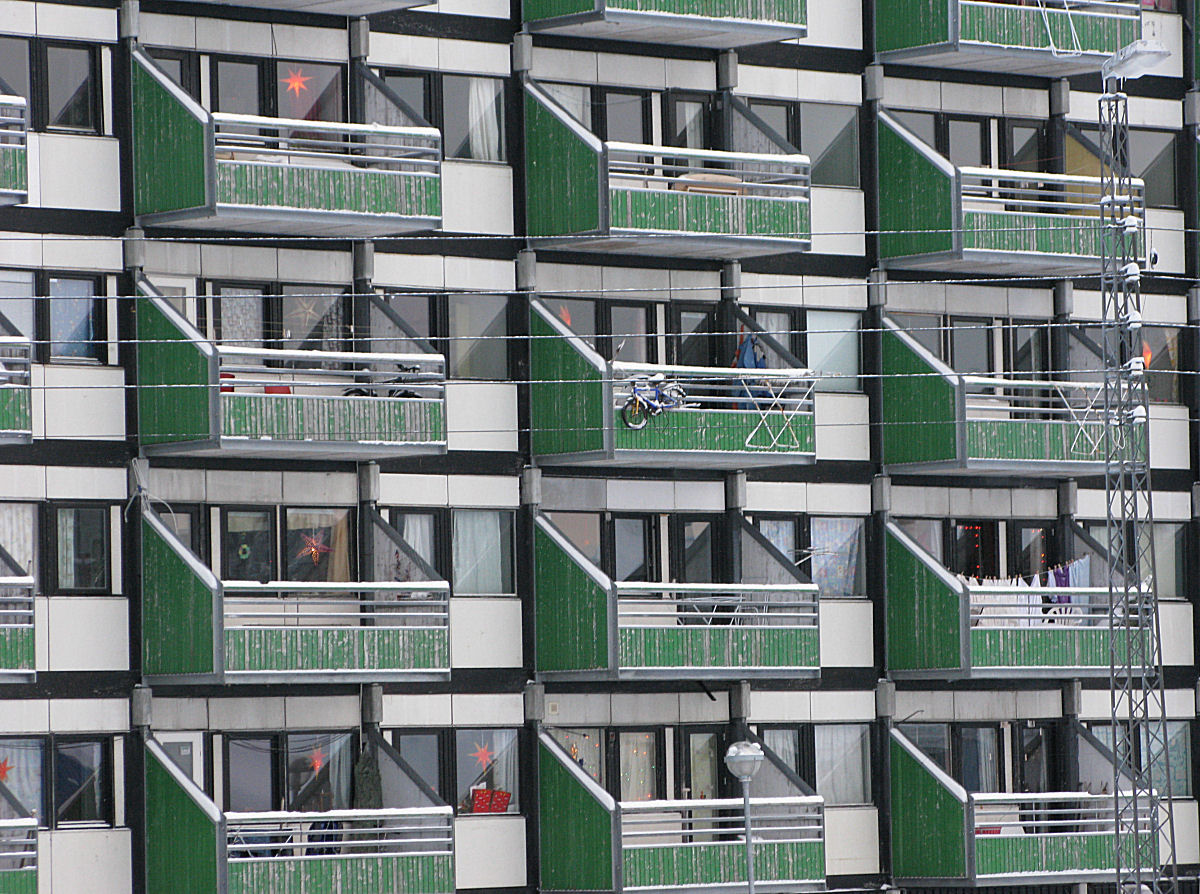
The dilapidated Blok P

In conjunction with the joint 2009 Greenlandic Home rule and Nuuk city council decision to sanitize and partly dismantle the infamous Blok P in central Nuuk, a plan was drafted to primarily house the evictees in apartment blocks at Qinngorput. Many of the present Blok P tenants have expressed their unwillingness to move to the new district, citing both rising living expenses and lack of commuting possibilities.

The tenants were offered housing in six apartment blocks, built in the Pisissia part of Qinngorput by subcontractor Permagreen. The clearing and subsequent cleaning of Blok P was done in two stages, beginning in 2011 with the second stage in early 2012. From 2013 the municipality created a community project over the former Blok P area, called Nuuk Playground. The majority of tenants from Blok P were moved to other places near the city.

== Infrastructure and services ==
The number of services in the district is on the rise. In addition to the already existing kindergarten and mass transit service points, on May 3, 2011, a new two-form entry school—Hans Lynge School—was handed over to Nuuk city. The school commenced its function in September 2011.

The school is planned to house 452 pupils from grades 1 to 7, with a planned option of expanding it to a three-form school. It will also double as a cultural center. While planning the school, the focus was on environmentally friendly design

In June, 2011, Sermersooq municipal council earmarked funds for a playground and activity park for children.

== Transportation ==
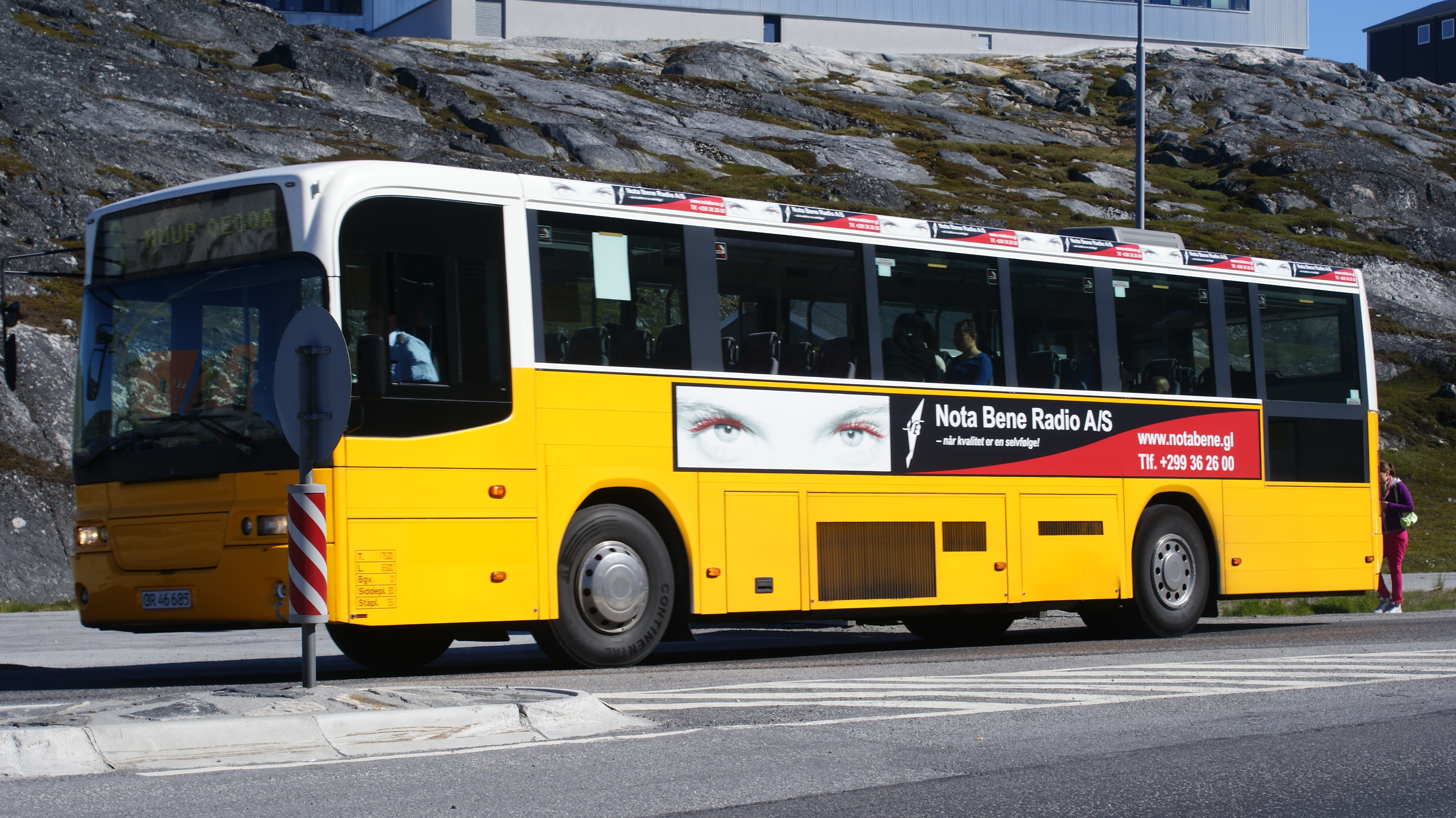
Nuup Bussii bus

=== Connections ===
Previously the only readily accessible route to the district was via the airport. In 2008, a road connecting Qinngorput to central Nuuk—via Nuussuaq—was finished, effectively cutting commuting time to the city centre in half. The road is named after government minister Agnethe Davidsen. From 2013, there are two to four buses available from the city each hour. It takes approximately 10–15 minutes to get into the city.

=== Mass transit ===
Commuting between downtown and Qinngorput is facilitated by the local Nuup Bussii bus company. It operates three bus routes. Route 1 and 1A run together every 20 minutes directly between downtown and the district; Route 3 runs a route full of detours, connecting the district with Nuuk Airport, Nuussuaq and downtown once an hour from Monday to Saturday.
