= Seamen's Home =

Seamen's Home is a Danish hotel chain and may refer to:

- Seamen's Home (hotel chain)
  - Seamen's Home (Aalborg)
  - Seamen's Home (Aasiaat)
  - Seamen's Hotel (Hanstholm)
  - Seamen's Home (Nuuk)
  - Seamen's Home (Qaqortoq)
  - Seamen's Home (Sisimiut)
  - Seamen's Hotel (Tórshavn)
