= Qernertunnguit =

Neighborhood of Nuuk, Greenland

Coordinates: 64°11′20″N 51°43′30″W

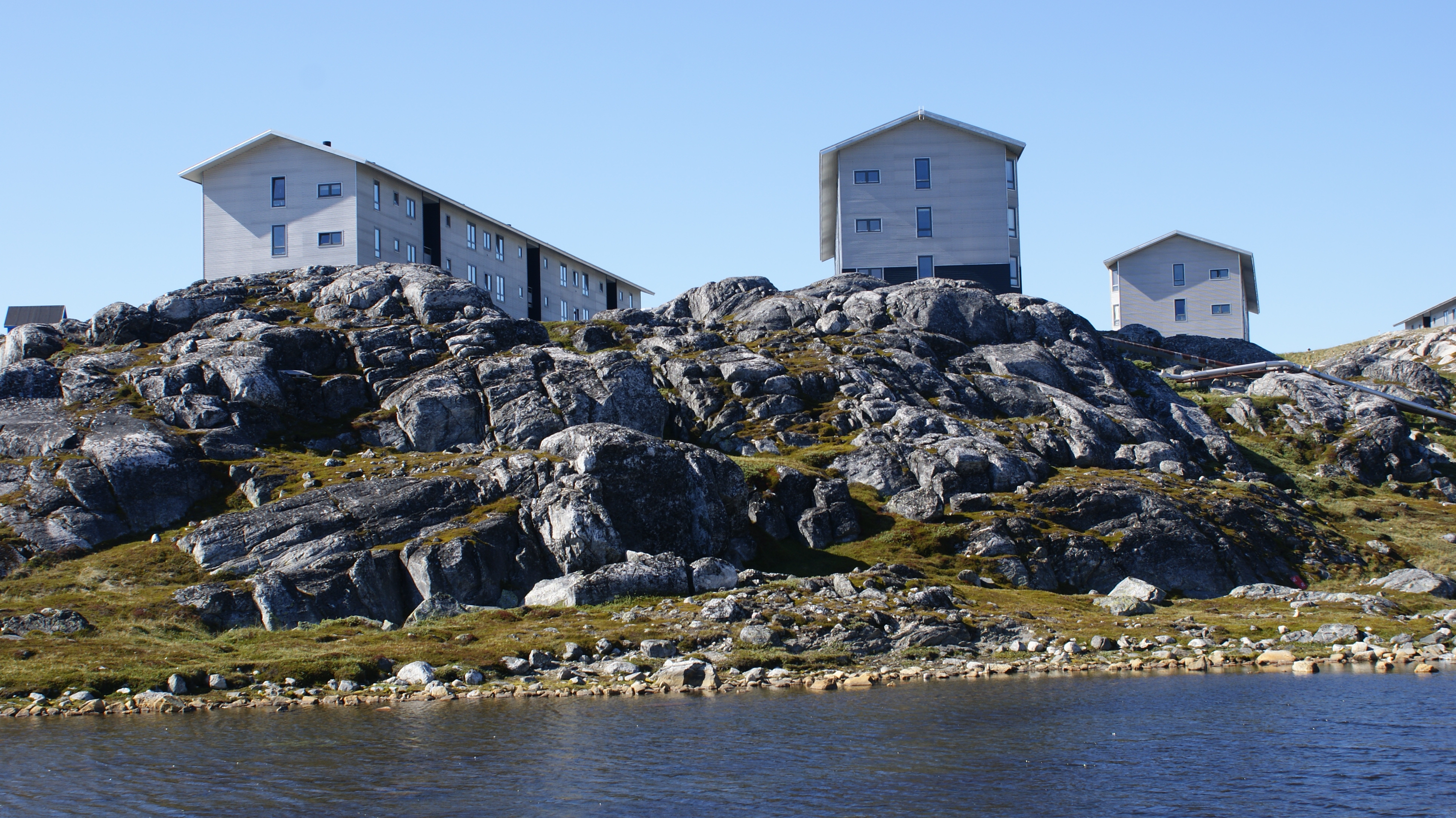
Qernertunnguit

Qernertunnguit is a neighborhood of Nuuk, the capital of Greenland. It is part of the Quassussuup Tungaa district, located in the northwestern part of the town, facing the Nuup Kangerlua fjord.

== Transport ==
Nuup Bussii provides bus services linking the neighborhood to the Nuuk Centrum.
