= Public and National Library of Greenland =

- Nunatta Atuagaateqarfia
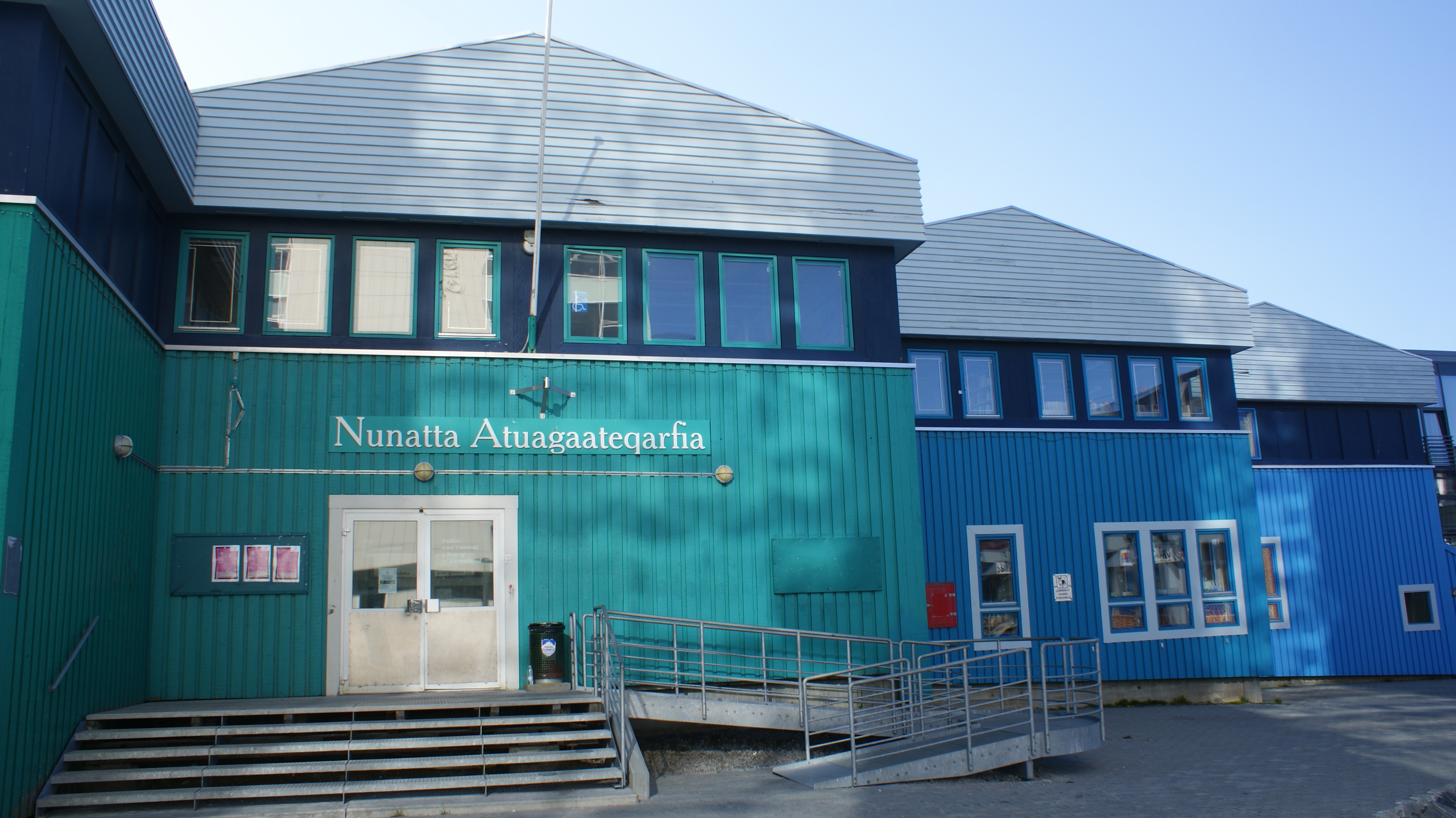
- Nunatta Atuagaateqarfia building in the Nuuk Centrum
- Interactive map of the Public and National Library of Greenland area

General information
- Location: Nuuk, Greenland
- Coordinates: 64°10′32″N 51°44′21″W

Website
- katak.gl

The Public and National Library of Greenland (Greenlandic: Nunatta Atuagaateqarfia) is the public and national library of Greenland, located in Nuuk, the capital of Greenland. It is the largest reference library in the country, devoted to the preservation of national cultural heritage and history.

== Collections ==
The library holdings are split between the public library in the town centrum, and Ilimmarfik, the campus of the University of Greenland, located in the Nuussuaq district of Nuuk, where the Groenlandica collection of historical material related to Greenland is held. As of 2018, there are 101,824 items in the library database at Ilimmarfik.

== See also ==
- List of national libraries
- List of libraries in Denmark
