= Hotel Hans Egede =

Hotel in Nuuk, Greenland

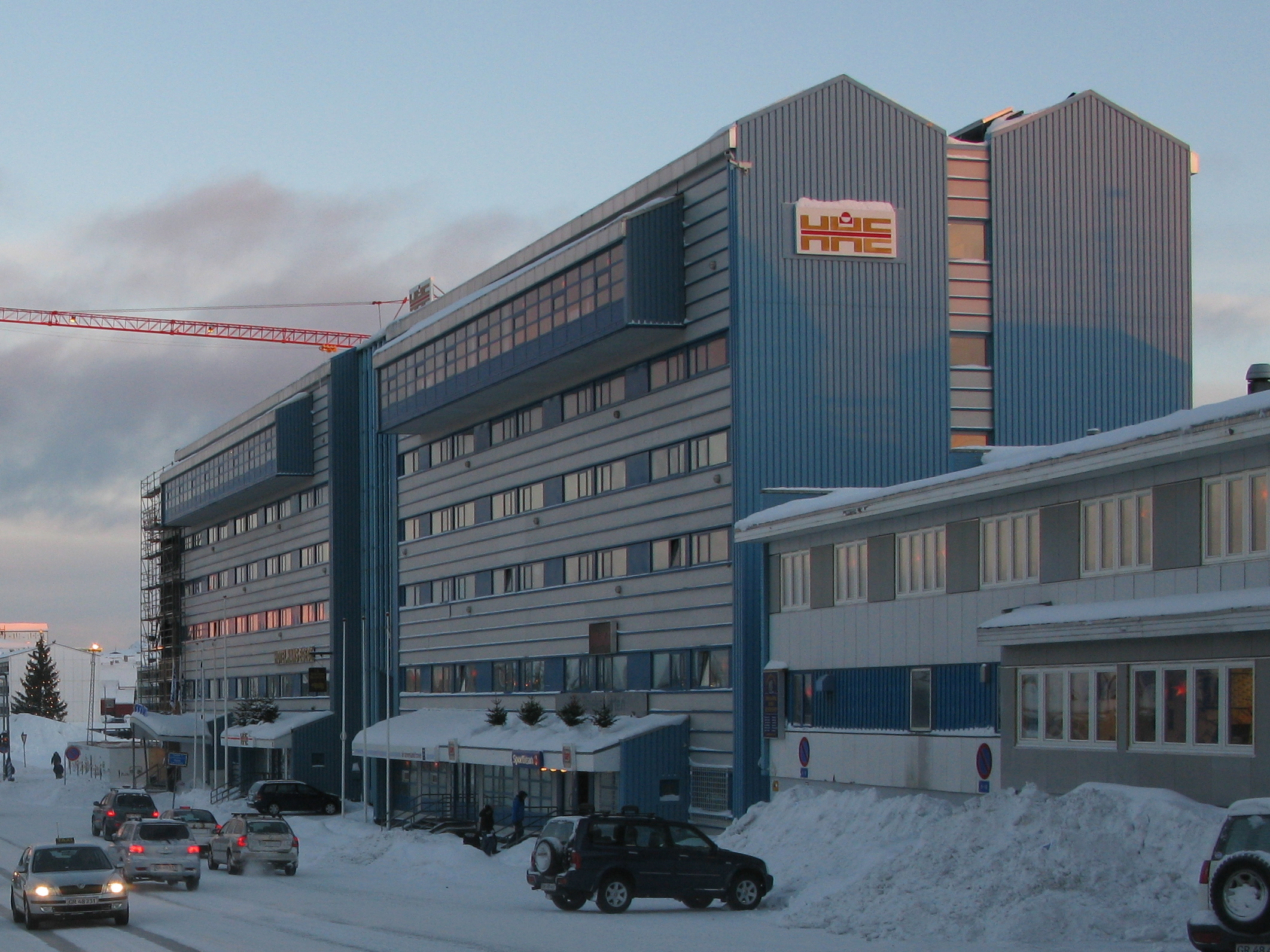

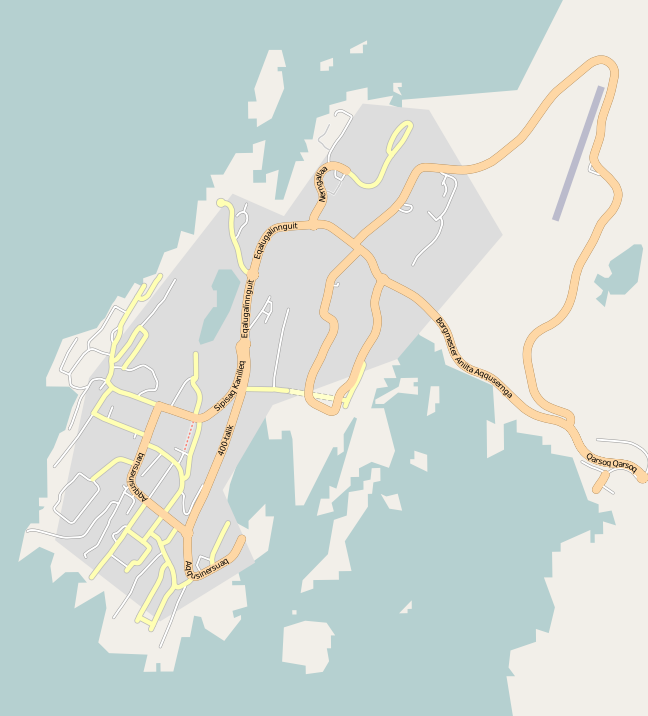
- Location within Nuuk

General information
- Location: Aqqusinersuaq, Nuuk, Greenland
- Coordinates: 64°10′30″N 51°44′10″W
- Opening: 1987

Technical details
- Floor count: 6

Other information
- Number of rooms: 140
- Number of restaurants: 2

Website
- hhe.gl

Hotel Hans Egede is a four-star hotel in Nuuk, Greenland. It is named after Hans Egede, is the largest hotel in Nuuk and was built in 1987. The hotel is located on the main street, Aqqusinersuaq.

It has 140 rooms and 10 apartments and is commonly used for conferences. There are two restaurants in the hotel, Restaurant Sarfalik and A Hereford Beefstouw. The hotel has one bar, the Skyline Bar, which is located on the top floor and which has a view over Nuuk. The hotel can accommodate conferences of up to 350 people.

== See also ==
- List of hotels in Greenland
