= Nuup Bussii =

Bus company in Nuuk, Greenland

Nuup Busii A/S
- Type: Aktieselskab
- Industry: Transport
- Founded: 1980
- Headquarters: Nuuk, Greenland
- Area served: Nuuk, Greenland
- Products: Public transport
- Number of employees: 31
- Website: www.bus.gl

Nuup Bussii A/S is a bus company in Nuuk, the capital of Greenland, providing public transport services for the city. Established on September 26, 1980, by the f Nuuk Municipality Nuup Bussii maintains a fleet of 16 distinct yellow buses and five support vehicles managed by over 30 employees, transporting more than two million passengers annually.

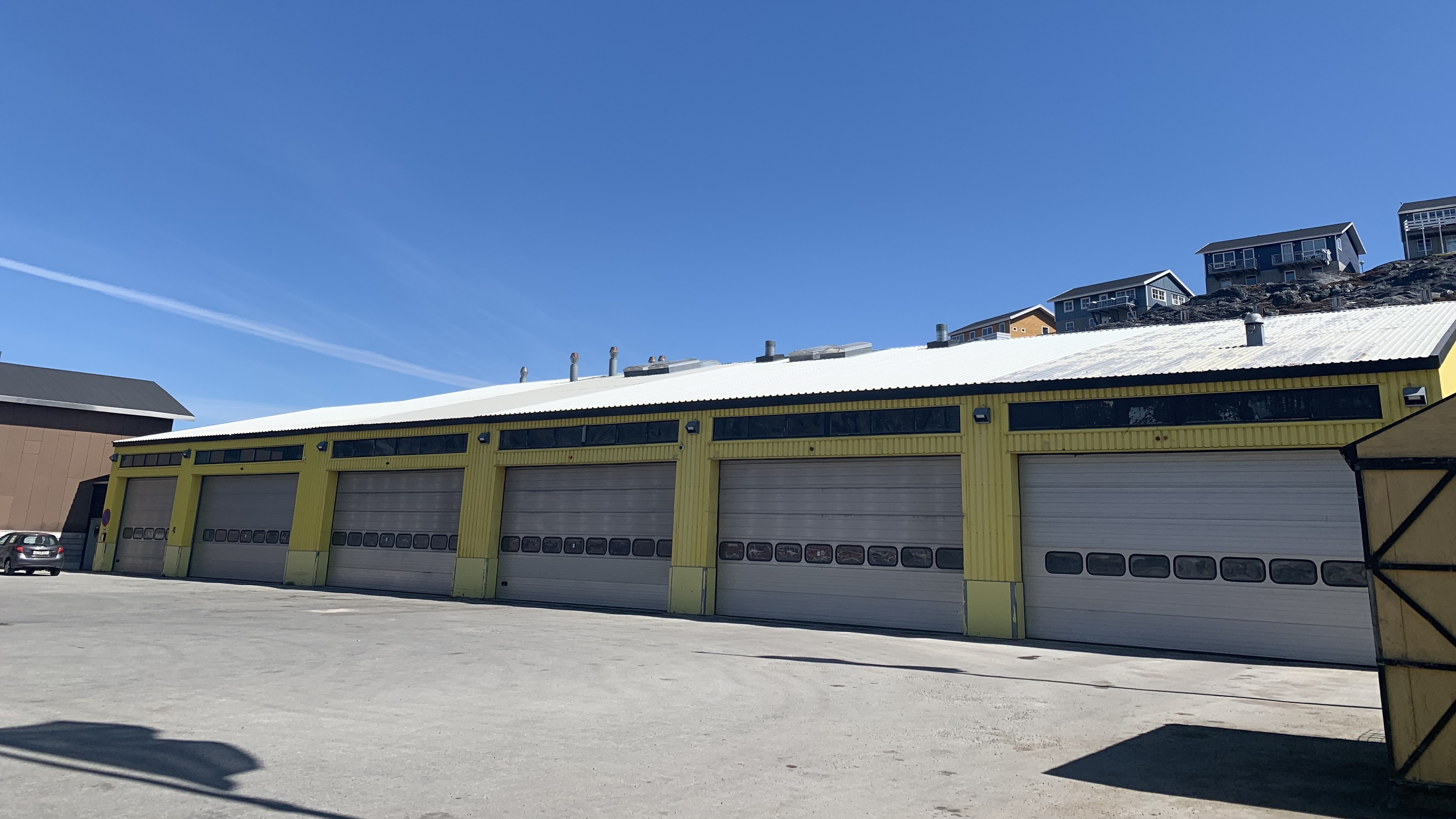
Bus depot at Industrivej, Nuuk

== History ==
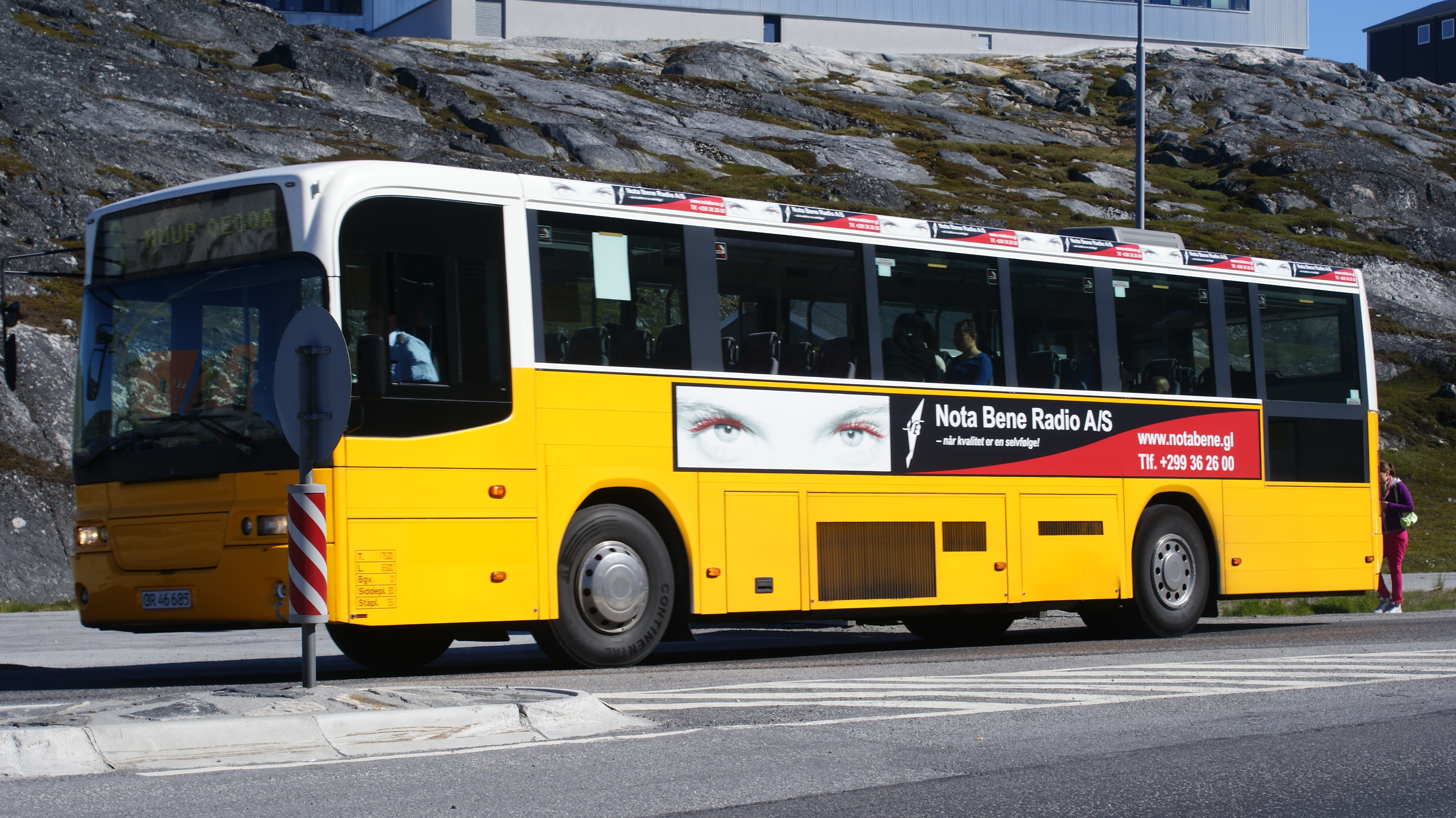
The characteristic yellow bus of Nuup Bussii, on the way from the town centrum to the Nuussuaq district of Nuuk.

Prior to the establishment of public services, the ground transport in the city was operated by private entrepreneurs. The volatility and alleged unreliability of the services prompted the former Nuuk Municipality to regulate the traffic, and establish a public transportation company, overseen by the municipal authorities. Nuup Bussii was then founded on 26 September 1980.It was established by the Nuuk Municipality to create a reliable public transit system for the city. The company began operations under its first director and chairman, Allan Idd Jensen, before transitioning board leadership in 1982 to Peter Petersen, who became the company's longest-serving chairman with a twelve-year tenure. In 1994, Laannguaq Lynge made history as the first woman appointed to chair the board, and a few years later, in 1998, Svend Erik Rothberg took over as director for a stable thirteen-year period that carried the company past its 25th anniversary.

In 2012, the buses transported more than 2 million passengers around the city of Nuuk. Since 2009 Nuup Bussii has provided city transport services in Nuuk for the new Sermersooq municipality, linking the town centre with the outlying districts and neighborhoods of Nuussuaq, Qinngorput, as well as Qernertunnguit in Quassussuup Tungaa.As of 2014, Nuup Bussii had 31 employees, operating 16 buses with a distinct yellow color, as well as five other small vehicles.

Over the last decade, Nuup Bussii significantly modernized its operations, introducing an electronic ticketing system in October 2016 and rolling out an updated digital platform in early 2017. Currently, iis led by board chairperson Christine Fleischer Tønnesen (appointed June 2023) and director Niels Chemnitz Frederiksen (appointed February 2025).

== Routes ==
- Route 1: Nuuk Center-Qinngorput–southern Nuuk–Nuuk Center, daily, every 40 minutes.
- Route 1A: Nuuk Center-Qinngorput–Nuuk Center, Monday–Saturday during peak hours only, every 20 minutes.
- Route 2: Nuuk Center–southern Nuuk–Qiterlia–Ilisimatusarfik–Nuussuaq–Qiterlia–Nuuk Center, daily, every 10 minutes (peak hours) to 40 minutes (after 21:00).
- Route 3: Nuuk Center–Nuussuaq–Ilisimatusarfik–Nuuk Airport–Qinngorput–southern Nuuk–Nuuk Center, Monday–Friday only, every 30 minutes (peak hours) to 60 minutes (off-peak).
- Route 4: Nuuk Center–Queen Ingrid's Hospital–southern Nuuk–Qernertunnguit–Myggedalen–Nuuk Center, Monday–Saturday only during peak hours only, every 30 minutes.
- A skibus shuttles between Nuuk Airport and Nuussuaq during weekends that the skilifts are opened.
