= Hotel Kangerlussuaq =

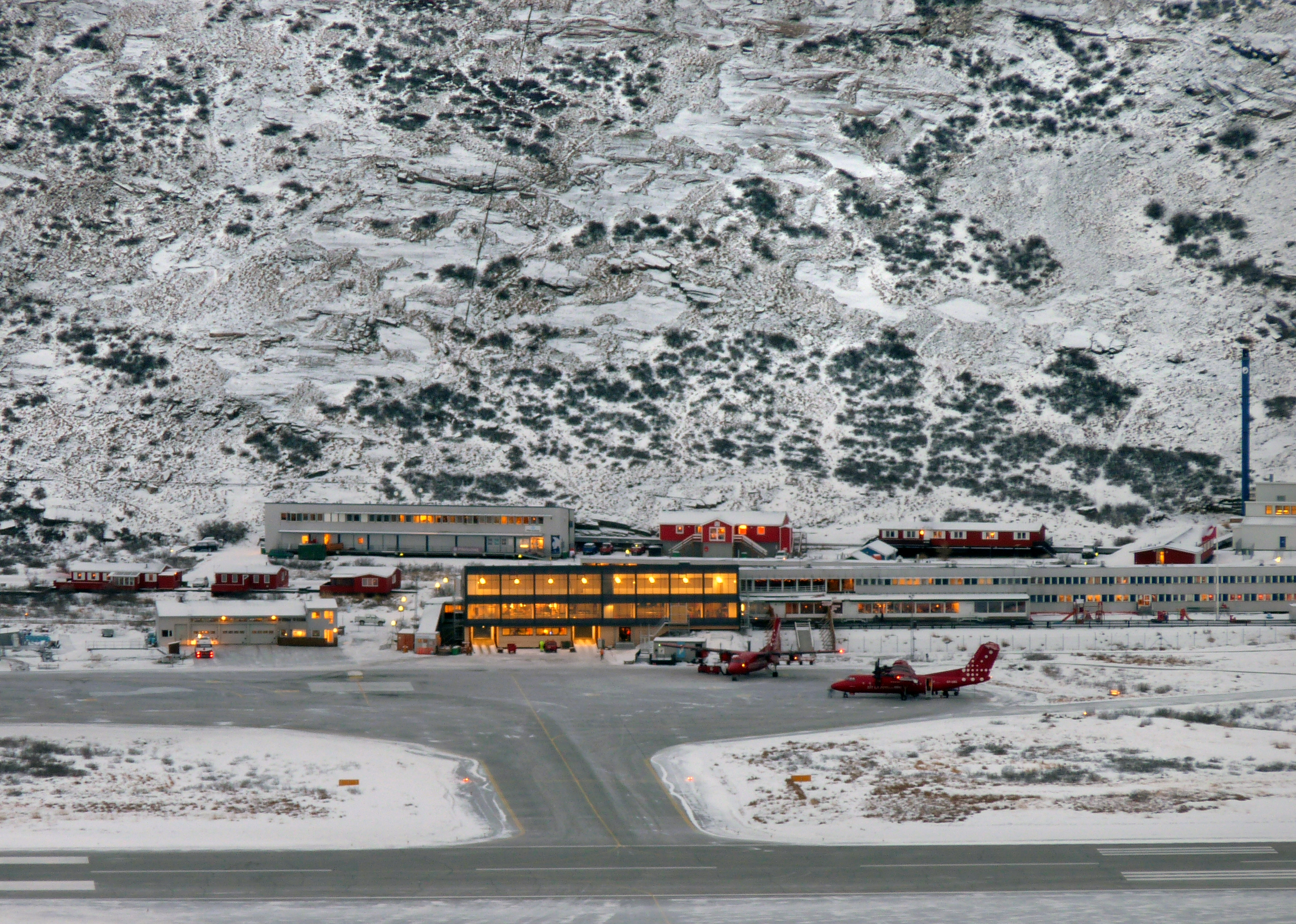

- Location within Greenland

General information
- Location: Kangerlussuaq, Greenland
- Coordinates: 67°1′10″N 50°41′48″W

Other information
- Number of rooms: 70

Website
- http://www.hotelkangerlussuaq.gl/

Hotel Kangerlussuaq is a hotel in Kangerlussuaq, Greenland.

== Location ==
Located at Kangerlussuaq Airport, this three-star hotel has 70 rooms and is a notable location for conferences.

The hotel is located on the site of a reclaimed United States Air Force base, Sondrestrom Air Base. It is the former base's landing strip which serves as the town's airport and the barracks have been converted to accommodation.

== Feature ==
The hotel is also featured in Clive Cussler's book, Sacred Stone.

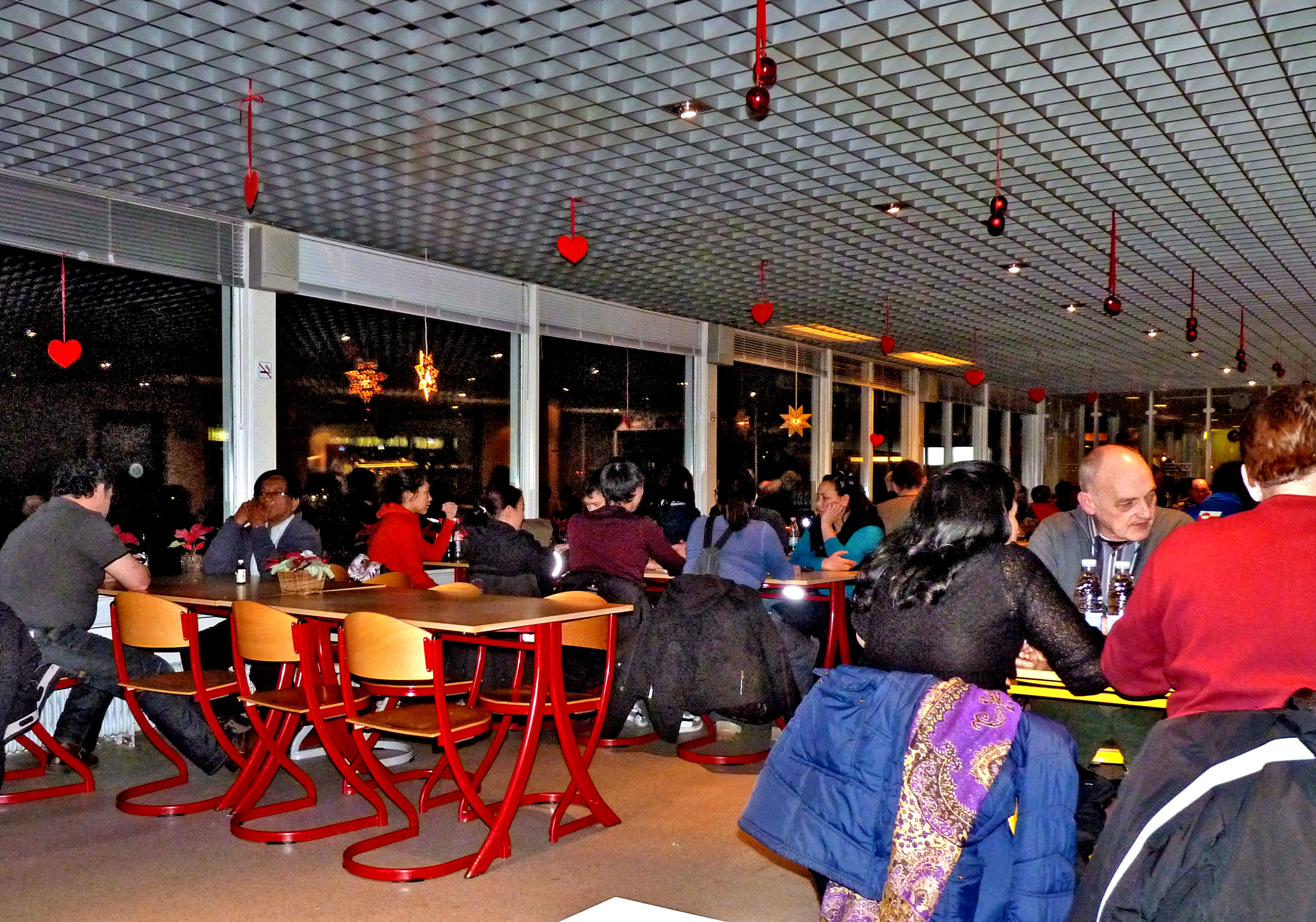

== See also ==
- List of hotels in Greenland
