= List of hotels in Greenland =

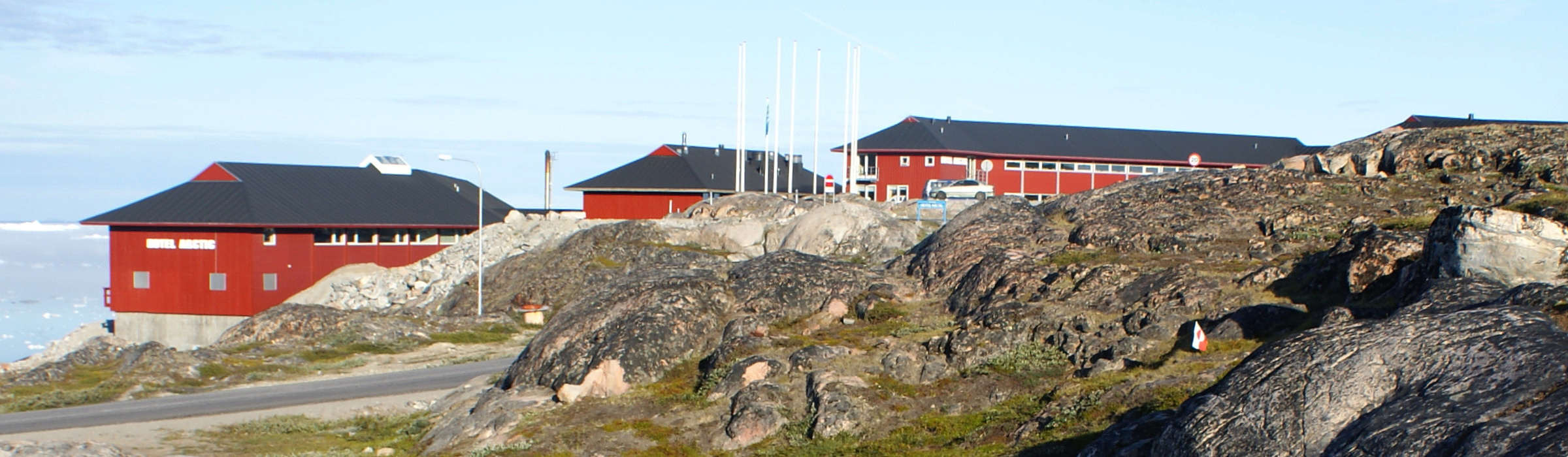
Hotel Arctic is the world's most northerly 4-star hotel, located to the north of the town of Ilulissat, Greenland, on the road to Ilulissat Airport.

This is a list of notable hotels in Greenland.

== Hotels in Greenland ==
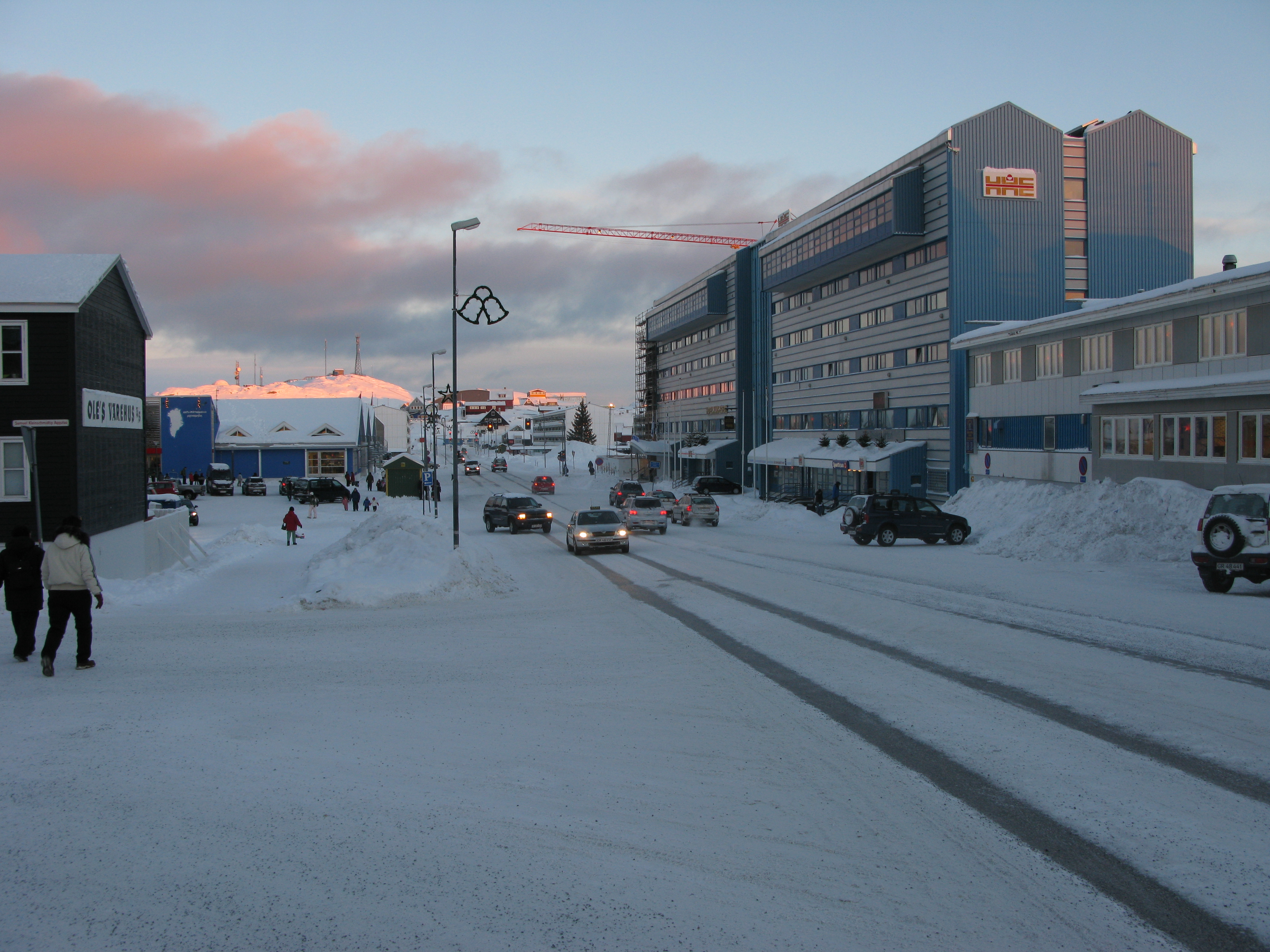
Hotel Hans Egede (right)

- Hotel Arctic, Ilulissat
- Hotel Hans Egede, Nuuk
- Hotel Kangerlussuaq, Kangerlussuaq
- Hotel Sisimiut, Sisimiut
- Seamen's Home, Nuuk
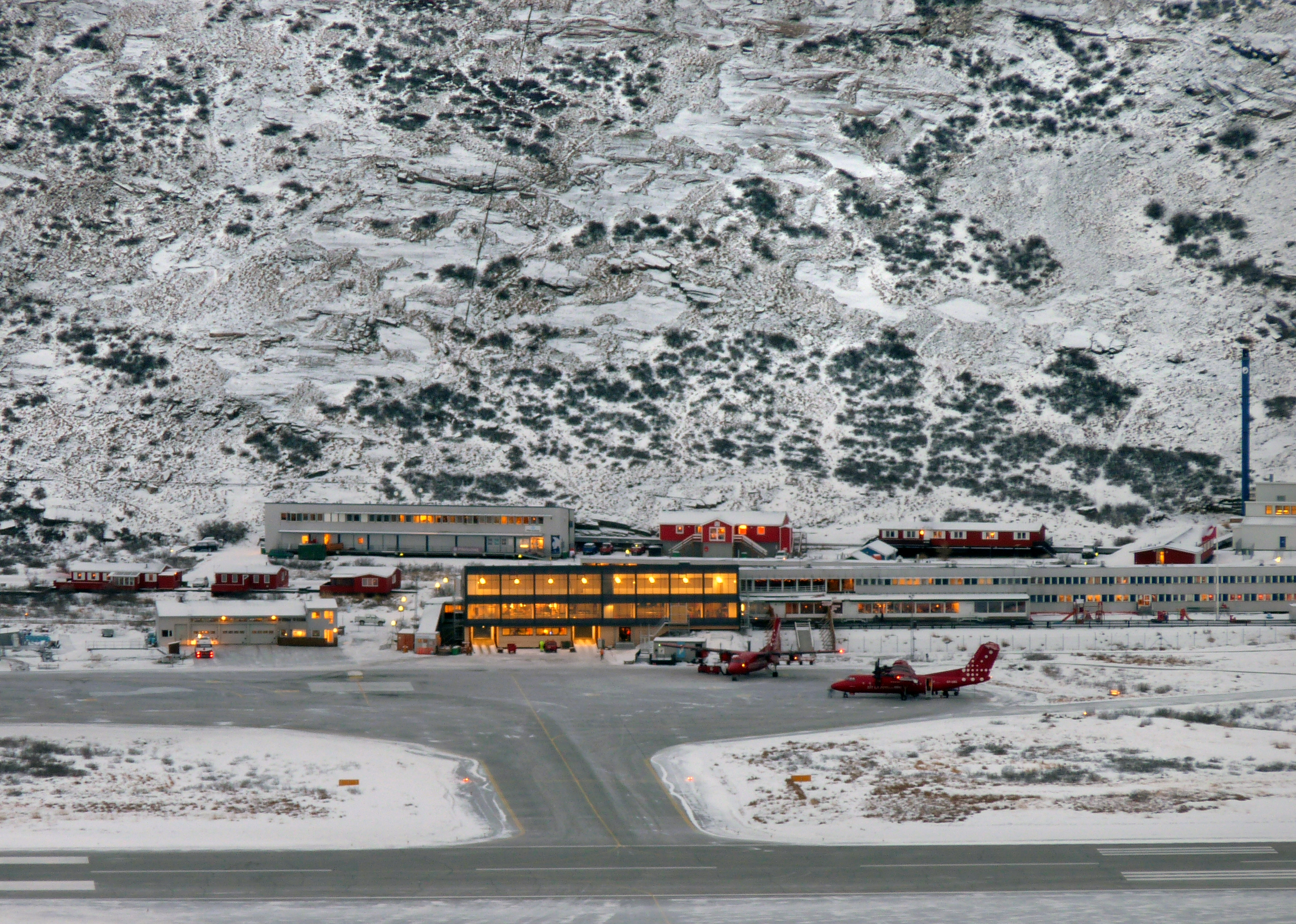
Hotel Kangerlussuaq

== See also ==
- List of companies of Greenland
- Lists of hotels – an index of hotel list articles on Wikipedia
