= Nuuk Center =

Shopping mall in Nuuk, Greenland

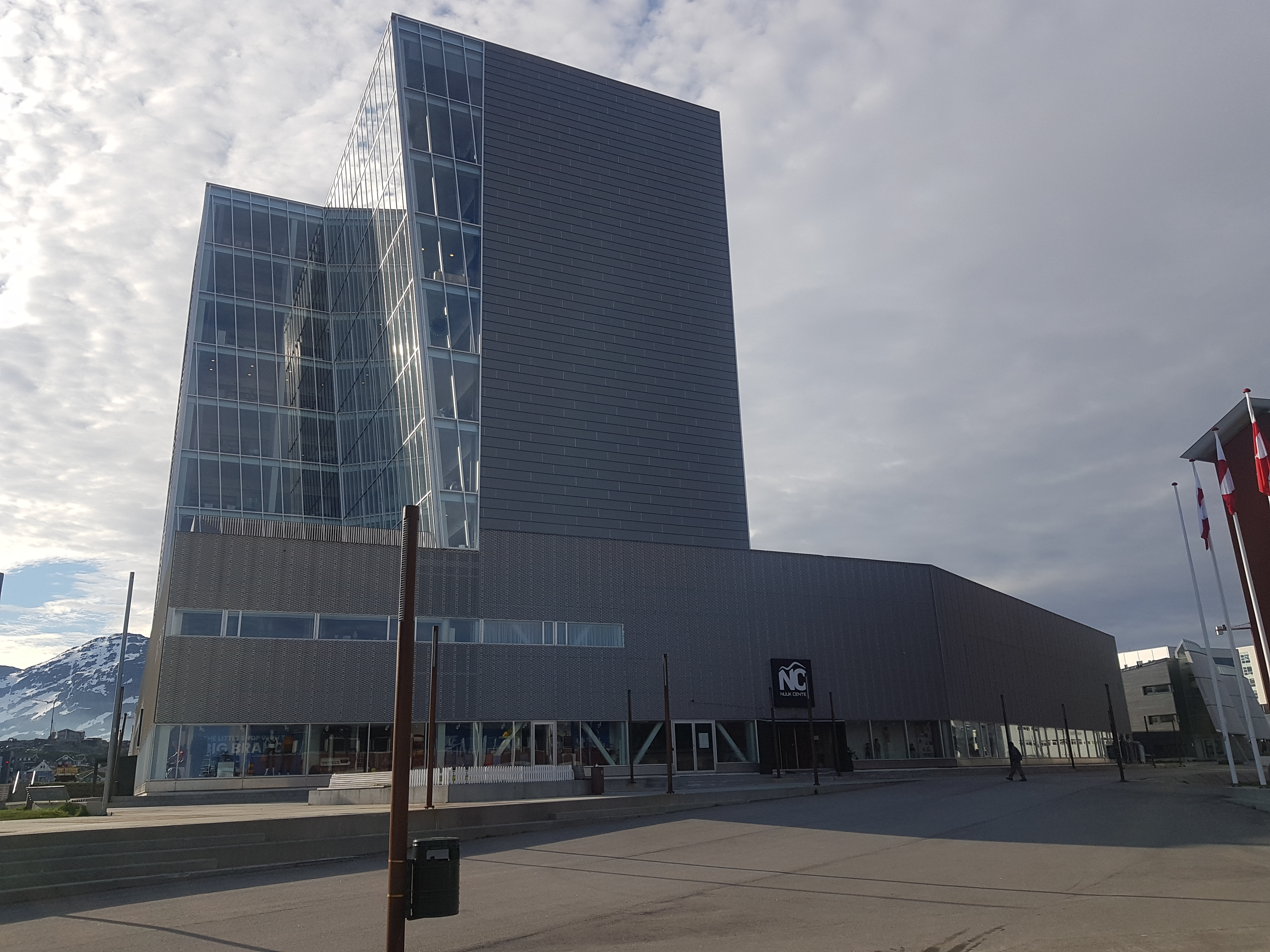

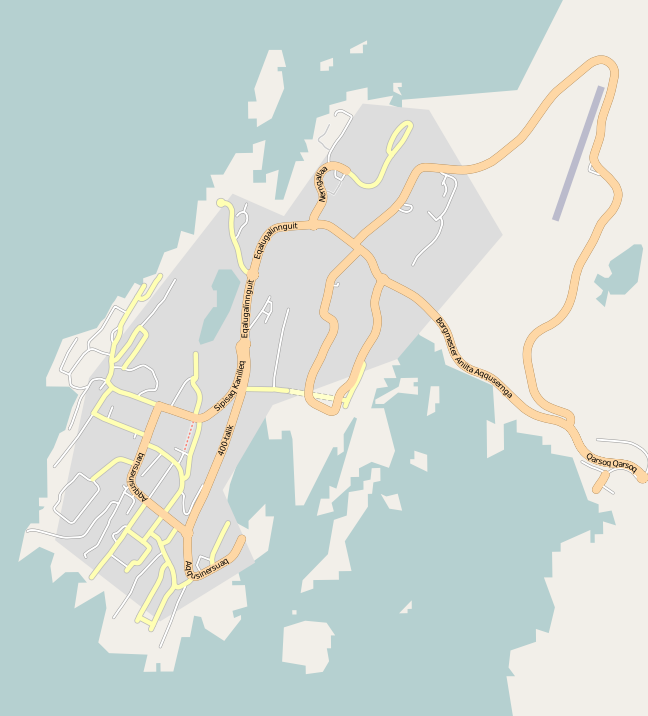
- Location within Nuuk
- Alternative names: NC

General information
- Status: Completed
- Type: Shopping mall
- Location: Nuuk, Greenland
- Coordinates: 64°10′40″N 51°44′20″W
- Opened: July 27, 2012; 13 years ago

Technical details
- Floor count: 10 (2-floor retail and 8 floor office tower)
- Floor area: 25,000 square metres (12,000 square metres office space)

Design and construction
- Architecture firm: KHR Arkitekter A/S
- Main contractor: MT Hoejgaard

Other information
- Number of stores: 26
- Parking: yes

Website
- Official website

Nuuk Center, also shortened NC, is a shopping mall located in Nuuk, Greenland. The mall, which is the first shopping mall in Greenland, was inaugurated on July 27, 2012. Located next door to the Katuaq Culture Centre, the mall is focused on offering services to a broad spectrum of customers. Above the mall is an 8-story office tower with 7,000 square metres of space. Nuuk Center is the largest and tallest building in Greenland.

== History ==
The planning and construction of the mall started in 2005, headed by the Nuuk Centre Association. The works were carried out by MT Højgaard.

The mall offers its customers the services of the first indoor, underground parking hall built in the country's capital.

== Mall contents ==
The mall building houses several local stores as well as their ancillary subsidiaries and sublets, such as cafes and shops. It also contains Greenland's first underground car park.

=== Level One ===
- Pisiffik - supermarket
- Synoptik - eyewear
- Nønne - clothing
- Ittu.net - clothing
- BabySam - children and infant clothing
- Lege-Kaeden - toys
- IQ Naasut - decor
- Bog & Ide - bookstore
- Pascucci Corner - café
- Matas - general merchandise
- Torrak Fashion - clothing
- Bones - restaurant

=== Level Two ===
- Torrak Fashion - clothing
- Kop & Kande / Nice - housewear and other goods
- ONLY - trendy clothing and decor
- MDC Data - computer and consumer electronics
- Ninni's Ropero - women's fashion
- N<xt Generation - children's wear
- Salon Mariia - hair salon
- Pisattat - consumer goods
- Suustu - clothing
- Anori Art - clothing and specialty merchandise
- Asiarpa - décor
- Eskiman - clothing
- Pappi - women's fashion
- Elgiganten - consumer electronics

== Reception and criticism ==
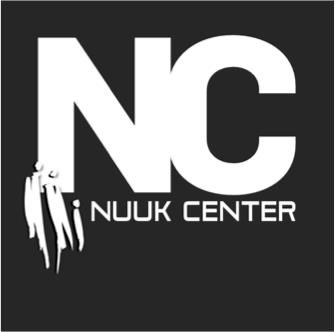
Logo of the Nuuk Center

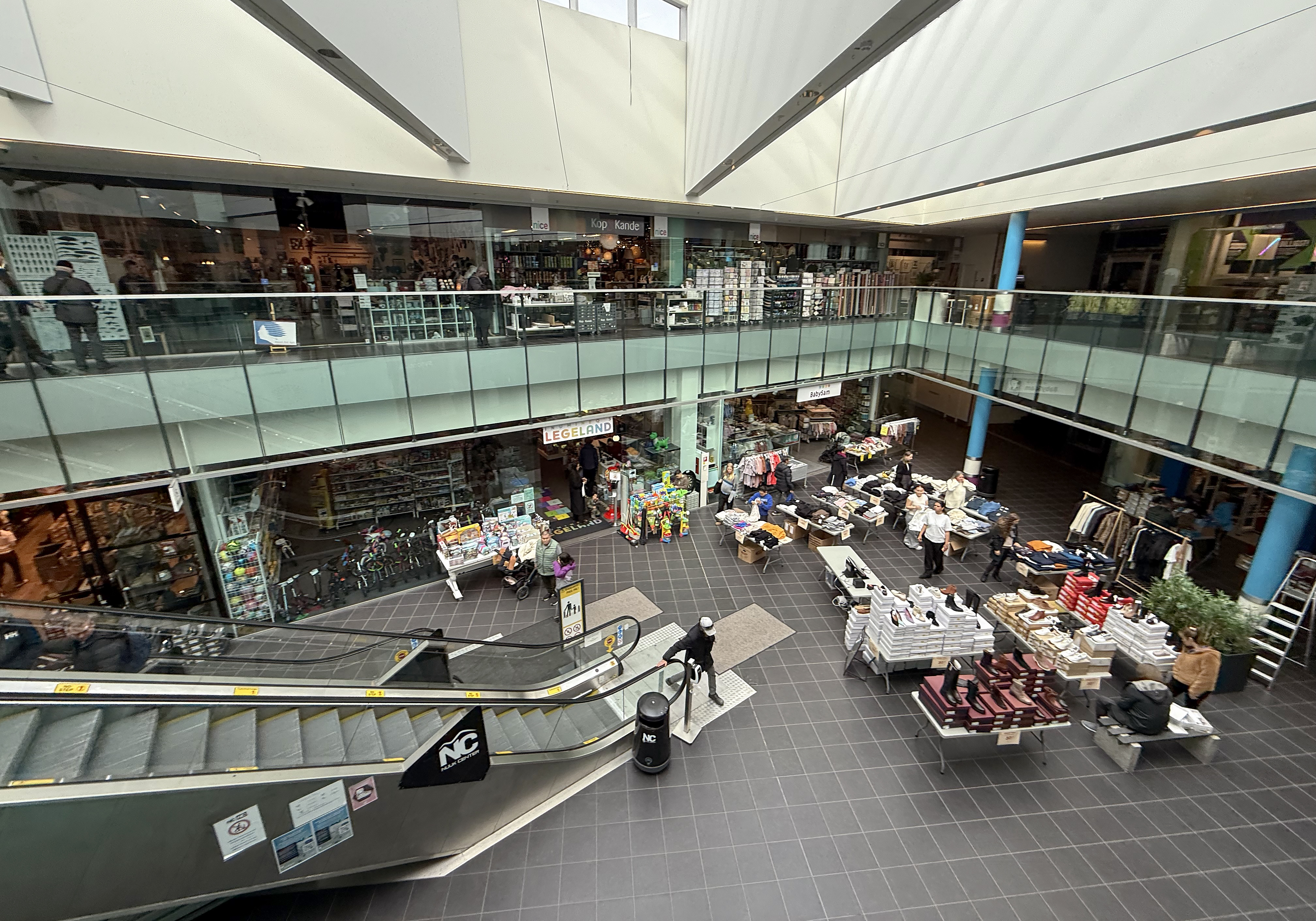
Interior of the mall at the Nuuk Center

Nuuk Center was welcomed by the local businesses, headed by Nuuk Centre Association, and generally seen as a vehicle for strengthening the presence of local enterprises. By having a centrally placed mall, local businesses could thereby better compete with multinationals. The mall was also seen as an employment opportunity.

The mall did not receive an uncritical welcome, however. While some expressed concerns the mall would change both the dynamics and the aesthetics of the city, others saw the mall as a threat to traditional trading customs. Members of the older generation perceived Nuuk as becoming "too European" by the integration and inclusion of what had been seen as essentially "foreign" institutions.
