= Blok P =

Demolished residential building in Nuuk, Greenland

Coordinates: 64°10′31.2″N 51°44′01″W

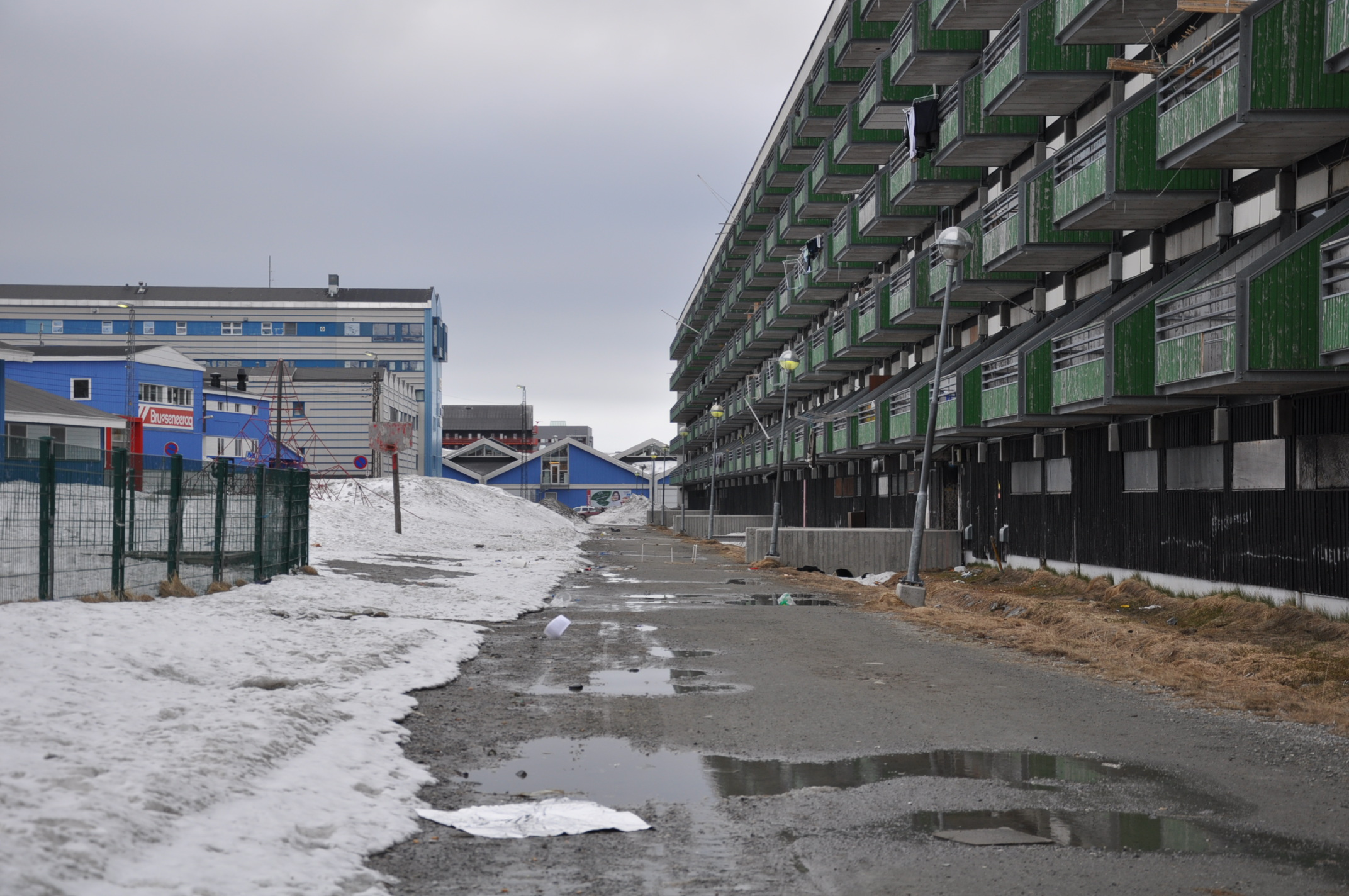
Blok P, South side

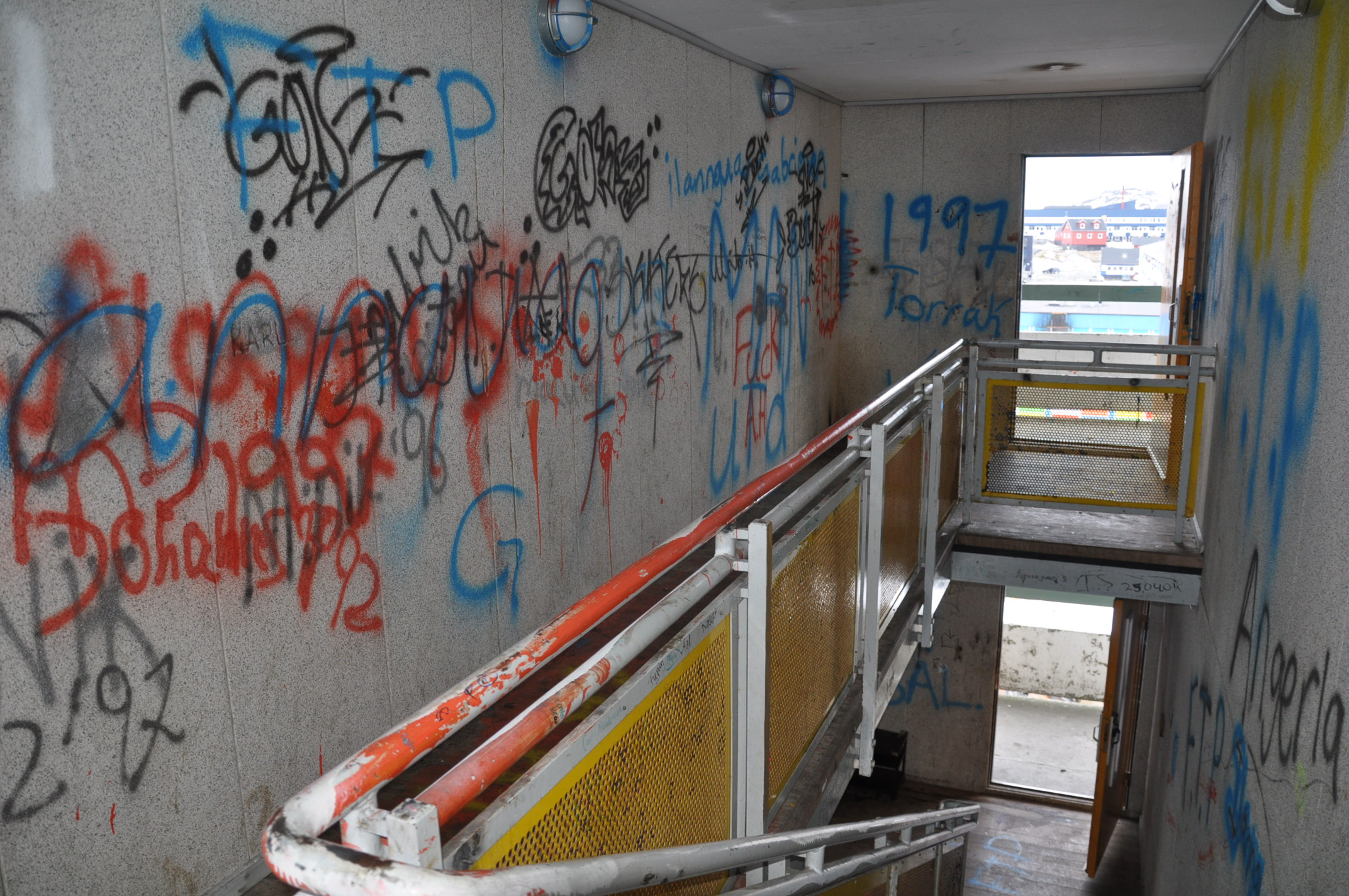
Staircases in Blok P (2011)

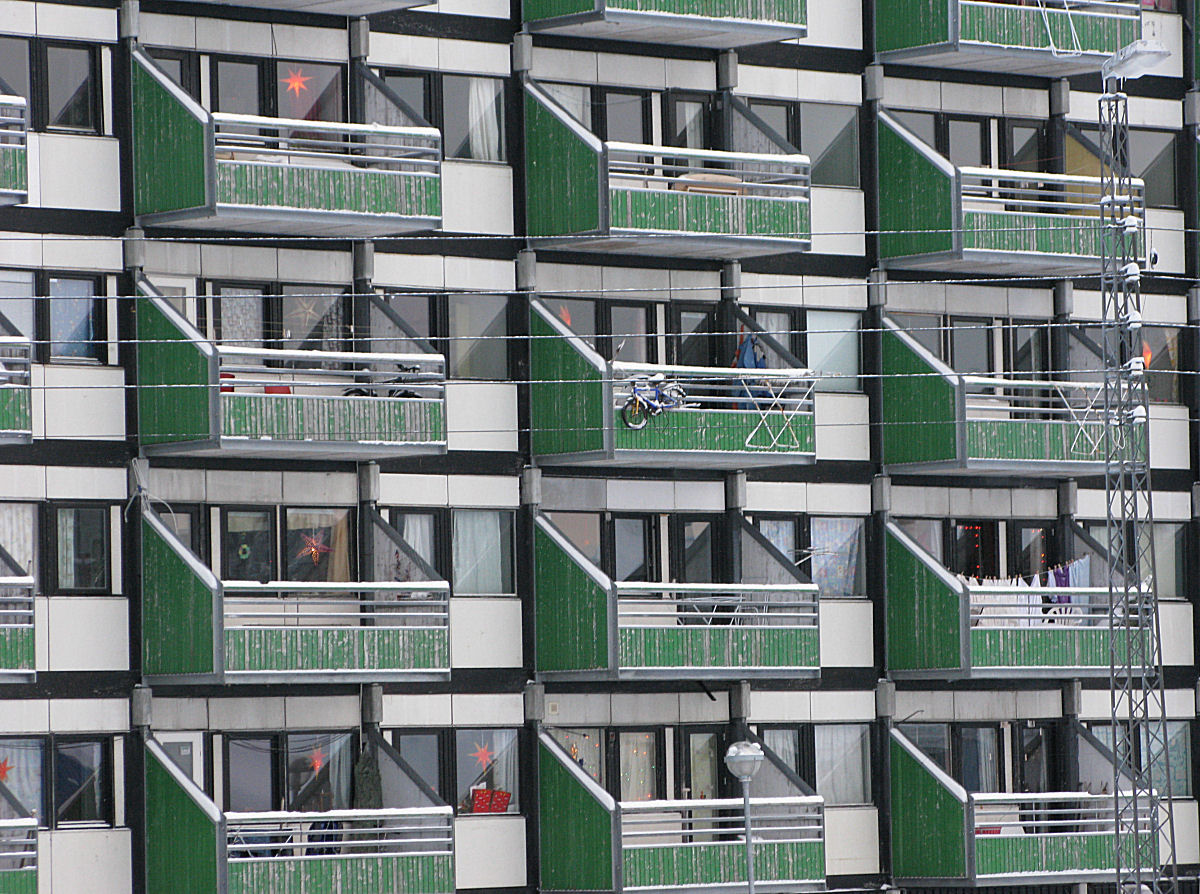
Blok P, balconies

Blok P, in Nuuk, was the largest residential building in Greenland. It contained around 320 apartments. Approximately 1% of the total population of the entire island lived in the building. The building was demolished on 19 October 2012.

== History ==
The building was built and erected in 1965–1966 as part of the Danish parliament Folketing's 1953 programme to modernize and urbanize the Greenlandic infrastructure by moving people away from the coastal settlements, which were deemed "unprofitable, unhealthy and unmodern".

When it was built, it was the largest building construction in the Kingdom of Denmark. The size and floor plan of the apartments were entirely unsuitable for the Inuit lifestyle, with narrow doorways making it difficult, or sometimes impossible, to enter and exit wearing thick cold-weather clothing, and common European-style wardrobes were too small to store fishing gear. This gear was then stored on the balconies, blocking fire exits and creating a security hazard. In the first few years of the building's occupancy, there were minor problems with coagulated blood clogging up the drainage, stemming from the fishermen's using their bathtubs to carve up their catch.

The building was five stories high but at a length of 64 apartments, translating to over 200 metres, it cut right across Nuuk in an east–west direction. Blok P was generally viewed very unfavourably by the local population, and it was even presented to tourists as "so depressing that it's almost an attraction in itself".

== Demolition ==
The Greenlandic government, in conjunction with Nuuk City Council proposed a plan in 2010 to demolish. The residents were mainly offered replacement housing in Qinngorput. The building was dismantled in five stages, starting in 2011 with the final stage of land clearing and handover in 2014.

The city has held hearings and workshops for future development of the area in a 2024 plan.

== Largest Greenlandic flag ==
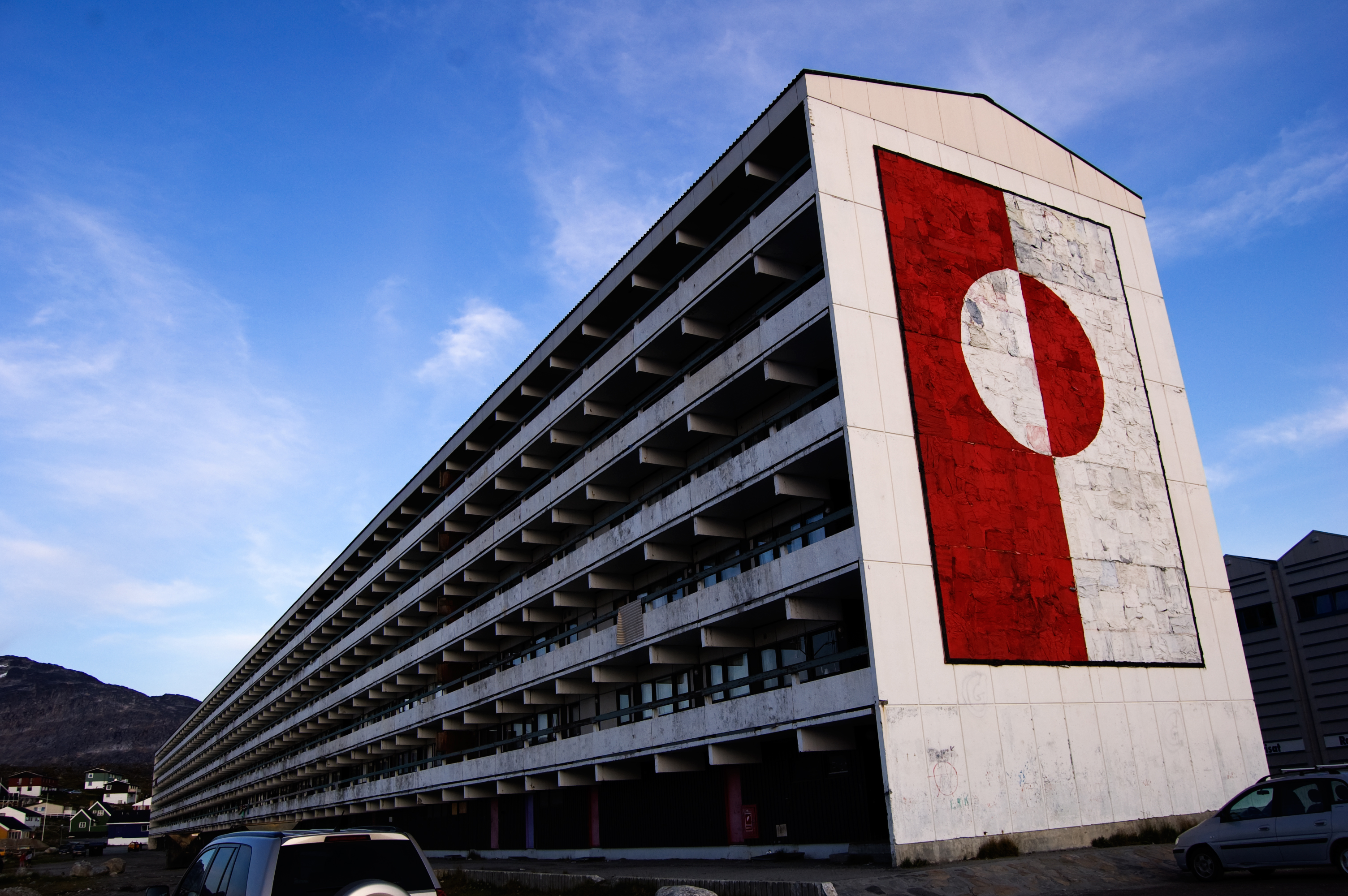
Blok P, North side with flag

The northern end of the building was decorated with the largest known Greenlandic flag. The flag, which consisted of discarded articles of clothing, was sewn by a local artist – Julie Edel Hardenberg – with the help of schoolchildren.
