= Hotel Arctic (Greenland) =

World's most northerly 4-star hotel

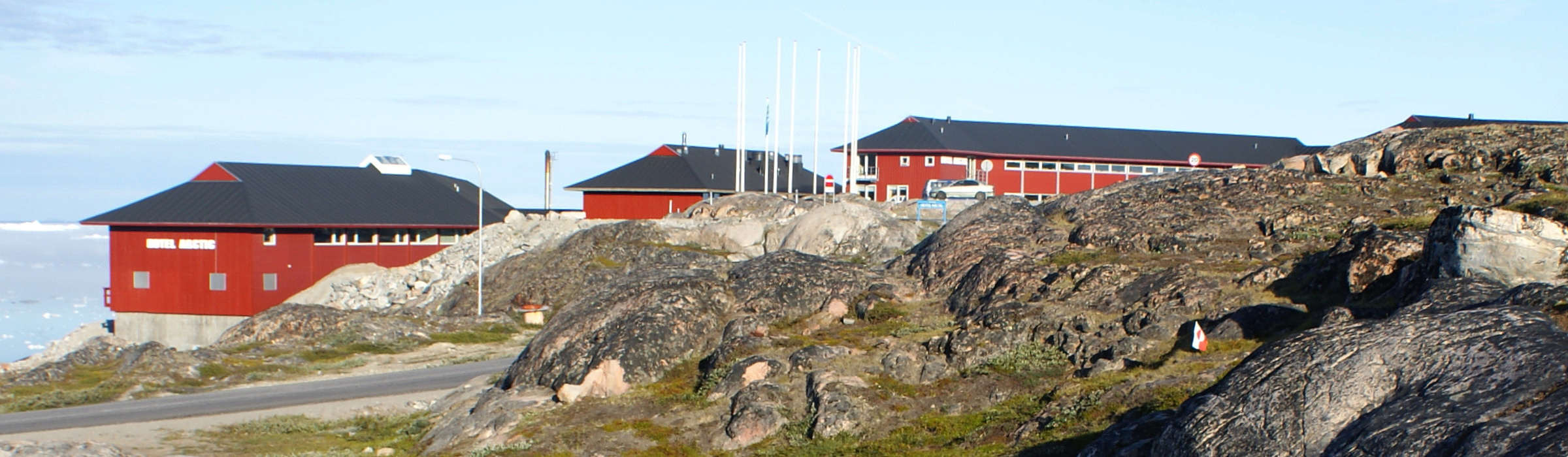
- View of Hotel Arctic

- Location within Greenland

General information
- Location: Ilulissat, Greenland, Kingdom of Denmark
- Coordinates: 69°13′37″N 51°5′36″W
- Opening: 1984
- Operator: Air Greenland (Morten Nielsen CEO)

Other information
- Number of rooms: 76 + 5 aluminium "Igloos", built right on the coast and connected to the hotel by a 75 metre boardwalk.
- Number of suites: 9
- Number of restaurants: 2 – Restaurant Ulo & Café Ferdinand
- Number of bars: 1
- Parking: On site – no charge

Website
- www.hotelarctic.com (Official Website)

Hotel Arctic is a 4-star hotel located 2.7 km north of the Ilulissat Icefjord, a UNESCO World Heritage Site owned by Air Greenland. The hotel was built shortly after the airport was opened in 1984 to accommodate passengers.

Hotel Arctic has 76 rooms, 9 suites and 5 aluminium "Igloos" built on the edge of the coast. The hotel's facilities can accommodate up to 120 people. The restaurant Ulo serves Greenland cuisine and local food.

On September 1, 2013, the hotel was 100 percent carbon-neutral.

== See also ==
- List of hotels in Greenland
