= Seamen's Home (Nuuk) =

Hotel in Nuuk, Greenland

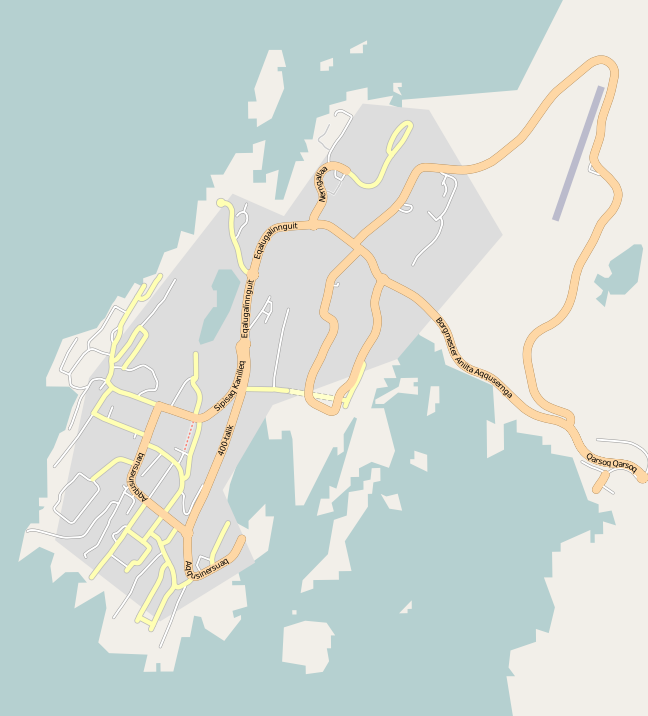
- Location within Nuuk

General information
- Location: Nuuk, Greenland
- Coordinates: 64°10′08″N 51°43′33″W
- Operator: Seamen's Home Hotel Group

Other information
- Number of rooms: 41
- Number of restaurants: 1

Website
- Official Website in English

Seamen's Home is a three star hotel in Nuuk, Greenland. Housed in a distinctive red building, it has 41 rooms, 37 of which are en suite. 18 of the rooms overlook Nuuk Port. The hotel has four large rooms for disabled people.

The main restaurant for guests is the Cafeteria Garni.

The hotel also has a conference room for 30 people.

== See also ==
- List of hotels in Greenland
