= Nuuk Centrum =

District of Nuuk, Greenland

Coordinates: 64°10′30″N 51°44′20″W

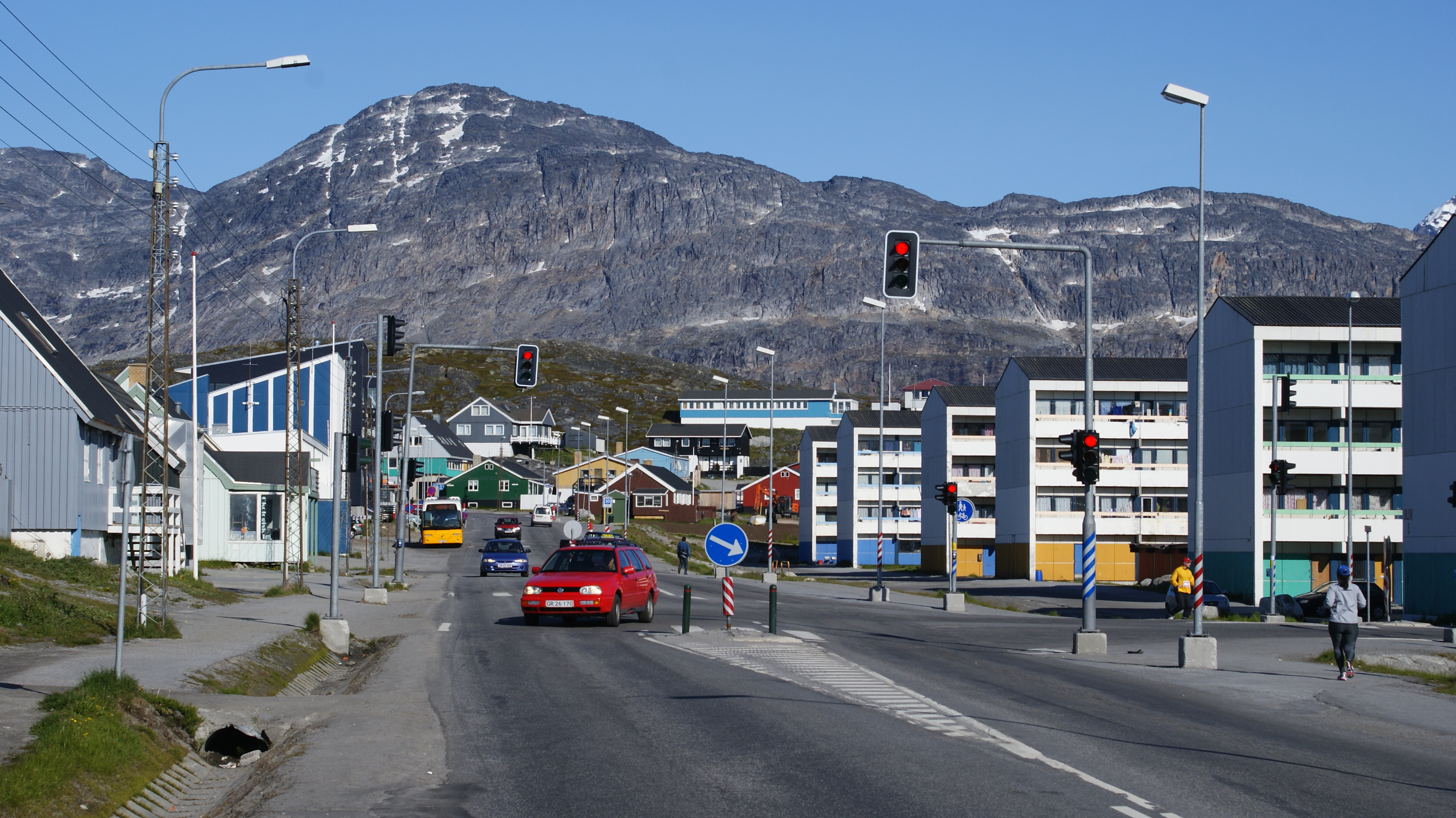
Nuuk Centrum

Nuuk Centrum is a district of Nuuk, the capital of Greenland. Together with the Old Nuuk neighborhood, it encompasses the southern and central part of the town. Most of the institutions and businesses are based in the district.

== Transport ==
Nuup Bussii provides bus services linking the heart of the city with all neighborhoods and districts.
