= List of modern historians of the Crusades =

The list of modern historians of the Crusades identifies those authors of histories of the Crusades from the 20th century through the present whose works are widely read. This is a continuation of the list of later historians of the Crusades which discusses historians from the 13th century through the end of the 19th century. That list was, in turn a continuation of the list of sources for the Crusades and the list of collections of Crusader sources. Two good references for these biographies are available. The first is The Routledge Companion to the Crusades by historian Peter Lock. The second is the Historians of the Crusades (2007–2008), an on-line database of scholars working in the field of Crusader studies.

== Early Twentieth Century ==
Historians from the early part of the 20th century include the following.

J. B. Bury. John Bagnell (J. B.) Bury (1861–1927), an Anglo-Irish historian, classical scholar, Medieval Roman (Byzantine) historian and philologist.

- Edward Gibbon's History of the Decline and Fall of the Roman Empire, 6 volumes (1898). A new edition, edited and with notes by J. B. Bury.
- The Cambridge Medieval History, 8 volumes (1911–1936). Planned by J .B. Bury.
- The Eastern Roman Empire 717–1453 (1923). Volume 4 of the Cambridge Medieval History.

Translations and Reprints from the Original Sources of History. Translations and Reprints from the Original Sources of History, 6 volumes (1901). A collection published by the University of Pennsylvania that includes articles by Dana C. Munro on Urban II, letters from the Crusaders and the Fourth Crusade.

Biographies. A number of biographies of Crusader figures were published in the 20th century, including the following:

- The Ancestry and Life of Godfrey of Bouillon (1947). By John Andressohn.
- Bohemond I, Prince of Antioch (1917). By Ralph Yewdale.
- Raymond IV, count of Toulouse. By John Hugh Hill and Laurita Lyttleton Hill.
- Robert II of Flanders in the First Crusade (1928). By M. M. Knappen.
- Robert Curthose, Duke of Normandy (1920). By Charles W. Davis.

Joseph Delaville Le Roulx. Joseph Delaville Le Roulx (1855–1911), a French historian specializing on the Knights Hospitaller (Order of the Knights of St. John of Jerusalem).

- Les Hospitaliers à Rhodes, 1310–1421 (1874).
- Documents concernant les Templiers extraits des archives de Malte (1882).
- Les archives la bibliothèque et le trésor de l'Ordre de Saint-Jean de Jérusalem à Malte (1883). The archives the library and treasury of the Order of the Knights of St. John of Jerusalem in Malta.
- La France en Orient au xive siècle: expéditions du maréchal Boucicaut. (1885). An account of the travels of French marshal Jean II Le Maingre (1366–1421), known as Boucicaut, a knight renown for his martial skills and chivalry. He was the sole participant in the Crusade of Marchal Boucicaut to Constantinople in 1399.
- Cartulaire général de l'Ordre des Hospitaliers, 4 volumes (1894-1904). Collection edited by le Roulx that consists of various charters and documents of the Order of the Knights of St. John of Jerusalem which are numbered and organized chronologically from 1100 to 1310.
- Les Hospitaliers en Terre sainte et à Chypre (1100–1319) (1904).
- Les Hospitaliers à Rhodes jusqu'à la mort de Philibert de Naillac (1310-1421) (1913).

Dana Carleton Munro. Dana Carleton Munro (1866–1933), an American historian.

- The Fourth Crusade (1896). In Volume 3.I of Translations and Reprints from the Original Sources of History.
- A Syllabus of Medieval History, 395-1300 (1899). Includes chapters of chivalry, the Byzantine empire, the Saracen empires, and the Crusades. Extended to 1500 by American medieval historian Joseph R. Strayer (1904–1987), published in 1942.
- Letters of the Crusaders (1902). Correspondence regarding the First through Sixth Crusades, and others through 1281. Published as a stand-alone document as well as Volume 1.IV of Translations and Reprints.
- Essays on the Crusades (1902). With works by Munro, Hans Prutz (1843–1929) and Charles Diehl (1859–1944).
- Urban and the Crusaders (1902). Collection of sources including Urban II at the Council of Clermont (also published separately), the Truce of God, privileges granted to the Crusaders, Peter the Hermit, and selected bibliography. Volume 1.II of Translations and Reprints.
- Christian and Infidel in the Holy Land (1902). In Essays on the Crusades.
- A History of the Middle Ages (1902). A textbook on the history of the Western world from Charlemagne until the fourteenth century, including the Byzantine empire, the Muslim world from 750 to 1095, and the Crusades from 1096 to 1204.
- Medieval Civilization: Selected Studies from European Authors (1904). with American historian George Sellery (1872–1962). Includes articles on: Chivalry (Jacques Flach); Character and results of the Crusades (Charles Seignobos); ibn Jubayr's al-Rihlah; and Material for Literature from the Crusades (Vincent Vaublanc).
- Did the Emperor Alexios I ask for aid at the Council of Piacenza, 1095? (1922) An article in the American Historical Review.
- The Kingdom of the Crusaders (1935). Based on Munro's lectures of 1924. A history from before the First Crusade until the loss of Jerusalem to Saladin in 1189. With an extensive bibliography.

Girolamo Golubovich. Girolamo Golubovich (1865–1941), an Italian historian.

- Serie cronologica dei reverendissimi superiori di Terra Santa (1898). A chronological series on the Grand Masters of the Knights Templar.
- Tratatello delle indulgentie de Terra Sancta (1900). The travel account of Italian friar Francesco Suriano (1480-1481). Edited by G. Golubovich.
- Biblioteca bio-bibliografica della Terra Santa e dell'Oriente francescano, 14 volumes (1906–1927).
- Collectanea Terrae Sanctae ex archivo Hierosolymitano deprompta (1933). Edited by G. Golubovich.

William Miller. William Miller (1864–1945), a British-born medievalist and journalist, specializing in the period of Frankish rule in Greece following the sack of Constantinople in 1204.

- Travels and Politics in the Near East (1898).
- The Latins in the Levant: History of Frankish Greece (1204–1566) (1908).
- Essays on the Latin Orient (1921). A comprehensive history of Greece, from Roman times, through the Byzantine empire, rule by the Franks, Venetians and Genoese, Turkish Greece (1460–1684), and the Venetian revival (1684–1718). Includes brief sections on the Balkans, the Latin kingdom of Jerusalem, and a biography of Anna Komnene, called a Byzantine Blue Stocking.
- Empire of Trebizond, the Last Greek Empire (1926). A history of the Empire of Trebizond (1204–1461), a successor state to the Eastern Roman Empire.

Ferdinand Chalandon. Ferdinand Chalandon (1875–1921), a French medievalist and Byzantinist.

- Essai sur le règne d'Alexis Ier Comnène (1081-1118) (1900). An account of the rule of Byzantine emperor Alexios I Komnenos (c. 1048 – 1118).
- Histoire de la domination normande en Italie et en Sicile, 2 volumes (1907).
- Jean II Comnène, 1118-1143, et Manuel I Comnène, 1143-1180 (1912).
- Histoire de la Première Croisade jusqu'à l'élection de Godefroi de Bouillon (1925). A history of the First Crusade from the Council of Clermont until the election of Godfrey of Bouillon as Advocatus Sancti Sepulchri, ruler of the kingdom of Jerusalem.
- Sigillographie de l'Orient latin (1943). Continuation of the work of French historian and numismatist Gustave Schlumberger (1844–1929).

Henry Gough. Henry Gough (1821–1906), a British barrister of the Middle Temple.

- Itinerary of King Edward the First throughout his reign, A. D. 1272-1307 (1900). A biography extracted from the public record that includes a history of Lord Edward's Crusade.

Marius André. Marius André (1868–1927), a French historian. (cf. French Wikipedia, Marius André)

- Le Bienheureux Raymond Lulle (1232-1315) (1900). A biography of Spanish missionary blessed Ramon Lull (1232/1236 – 1315).

Émile Bridrey. Émile Bridrey (1873-1943), a French historian.

- La Condition Juridique des Croisés et le Privilège de Croix (1900). The legal condition of the Crusaders and the Privilege of the Cross. A study of the history of French law.

Jean-Baptiste Martin. Abbé Jean-Baptiste Martin (1864–1922), a French historian of the Catholic Church. (cf. French Wikipedia, Jean-Baptiste Martin)

- Sacrorum Conciliorum nova et amplissima collectio, 53 volumes (1901–1927). First published in 31 volumes (1759-1798) by Giovanni D. Mansi (1692 –1769). Continued by J-B. Martin and Louis Petit (1868–1927). Extensive edition of Church councils from the First Council of Nicaea in 325 through the Council of Florence in 1438. Includes the Canons of the Council of Clermont. and other source material relevant to the Crusades.

Arturo Magnocavallo. Arturo Magnocavallo (fl. 1901), an Italian historian.

- Marin Sanudo il Vecchio e il suo progetto di crociata (1901). An account of Marin Sanuto the Elder and his crusade project.

Charles Bémont. Charles Bémont (1848–1939), a French scholar.

- Medieval Europe from 395 to 1270 (1902). A textbook originally written in French in collaboration with French historian Gabriel Monod (1844–1912). Introduction by American medievalist George Burton Adams (1851–1925). Translated into English by Mary Sloan. Includes chapters on the Christian and Muslim (Mussulman) Orient from the seventh to eleventh centuries, and on the First through Eighth Crusades.
- Histoire de l'Europe au moyen âge, 1270–1493 (1931). History of Europe in the Middle Ages from 1270 to 1493.

Edgar Blochet. Edgar Blochet (1870-1937), a French historian.

- Les relations diplomatiques des Hohenstaufen avec les Sultans d'Egypte (1902), in Revue historique 80, 1902.
- Introduction à l'Histoire des Mongols de Fadl Allah Rashid ed-Din (1910). An introduction to the work Jāmiʿ al-tawārīkh by Persian historian Rashīd al-Dīn Hamadān (1247–1318).

Karl Zimmert. Karl Zimmert (fl. 1903), a German historian.

- Der Friede zu Adrianapol, in Byzantinische Zeitschrift (1902).
- Der deutsch-byzantinische Konflikt vom Juli 1189 bis Februar 1190, in Byzantinische Zeitschrift (1903).

Lucien Paulot. Lucien Paulot (1864-1938), a French historian.

- Un Pape français: Urbain II (1903). With a preface by French historian Georges Goyau (1869–1939).

Charles Seignobos. Charles Seignobos (1854–1942), a French historian and historiographer. Considered as one of the leading proponents of the historical method along with French historian Charles-Victor Langlois (1863–1929). Seignobos' view of the Crusades is best summarized in a quote: "In the eleventh century ... the barbarous Christians penetrated the lands of the civilized Muslims".

- Character and Results of the Crusades (1904). An essay in Dana C. Munro's Medieval Civilization: Selected Studies from European Authors.
- History of Mediæval Civilization (1909). Translated by American historian James Alton James (1864–1962). The Crusades though the loss of Jerusalem to Saladin are briefly covered in Chapter VIII, Oriental Civilization in the West.

Achille Luchaire. Denis Jean Achille Luchaire (1846–1908), a French historian.

- Innocent III, 6 volumes (1904–1908). The six volumes are: Rome et Italie; La Croisade des Albigeois; La Papauté et l'Empire; La Question d'Orient; Les Royautés vassales du Saint-Siège; and Le Concile de Latran et la réforme de l'Église.

Jules Gay. Jules Gay (1867–1935), a French historian specializing in the medieval popes.

- Le Pape Clément VI et les affaires d'Orient (1342–1352) (1904).

Ernst Gerland. Ernst Gerland (1870–1934), a German historian.

- Geschichte des lateinischen Kaiserreiches von Konstantinopel (1905).

Giuseppe Gerola. Giuseppe Gerola (1877–1938), an Italian historian known for his involvement in monument restoration projects and his studies on the Kingdom of Candia (Venetian Crete).

- Monumenti veneti nell'isola di Creta, 4 volumes (1905).

William Barron Stevenson. William Barron Stevenson (1869-1954), a British historian.

- The Crusaders in the East: A brief history of the wars of Islam with the Latins in Syria during the twelfth and thirteenth centuries (1907). A history of the Crusades from the Muslim viewpoint, with sources drawn from Islamic histories. Includes major chapters on Zengi, Nur ad-Din and Saladin. Extensive bibliography and chronology discussion.

James Rennell Rodd. James Rennell Rodd, 1st Baron Rennell (1858–1941), a British historian, poet and politician, serving as British Ambassador to Italy during the First World War.

- The Princes of Achaia and the Chronicles of Morea: A study of Greece in the Middle Ages (1906).

Oliver J. Thatcher. Oliver Joseph Thatcher (1857–1937), an American historian.

- A source book for mediæval history: selected documents illustrating the history of Europe in the Middle Age (1905). With Edgar H. McNeal.
- Library of original sources (1907). Volume IV discusses the Crusades.

Edgar H. McNeal. Edgar Holmes McNeal (1874–1955), an American medieval historian.

- A source book for mediæval history: selected documents illustrating the history of Europe in the Middle Age (1905). With Oliver J. Thatcher.
- The conquest of Constantinople (1936). Translated from the old French work La Conquête de Constantinople of Robert de Clari (died after 1216).

Maurice Prou. Maurice Prou (1861–1930), a French archivist, paleographer and numismatist.

- Recueil des actes de Philippe Ier, roi de France (1059-1108) (1908). With Auguste H. Longnon (1844–1911).

Alan Orr Anderson. Alan Orr Anderson (1879–1958), a Scottish historian and compiler.

- Scottish annals from English Chroniclers A.D. 500 to 1286 (1908).
- Early Sources of Scottish History, A.D. 500 to 1286, 2 volumes (1922).

August C. Krey. August Charles Krey (1887–1961), an American medievalist.

- John of Salisbury's Knowledge of the Classics (1909). Classical interests of John of Salisbury (1115/1120–1180), bishop of Chartres, author of Historia Pontificalis quae Supersunt, a description of Western Europe during and after the Second Crusade. John reputedly lost an arm trying to protect Thomas Becket from a fatal blow.
- The First Crusade: The Accounts of Eyewitnesses and Participants (1921).
- A history of deeds done beyond the sea (1943). A translation of William of Tyre's work, with Emily Atwater Babcock.
- Urban's Crusade: Success or Failure (1948). In American Historical Review, LIII (1948), pp. 235–250.
- Review of Crusading Warfare (1097-1193), by R. C. Smail. The American Historical Review, 62(2), 378–379.

T. E. Lawrence. Thomas Edward (T. E.) Lawrence (1888–1935), a British officer, archaeologist and author, famously known as Lawrence of Arabia. Member of the Palestine Exploration Fund. Lawrence was a British representative at the Paris Peace Conference, 1919–1920.

- The Influence of the Crusades on European Military Architecture—to the End of the 12th Century (1910). Lawrence's thesis at Oxford. Eventually published as Crusader Castles, 2 volumes, in 1936.
- Introduction to Travels in Arabia Deserta (1921), by English explorer Charles M. Doughty (1843–1926)
- Anonymous articles for the Times of London, supporting the Arab cause after World War I.
- Seven Pillars of Wisdom (1922, published 1926). An autobiographical account of Lawrence's activities during the war. Made into the film Lawrence of Arabia in 1962.

Harry Neal Baum. Harry Neal Baum (1889–1967), an American historian and author. He was the third son of L. Frank Baum.

- Count Raymond of Toulouse (1915). A biography of Raymond IV of Toulouse.

Henri Dehérain. Henri Dehérain (1867–1941), a French historian and geographer.

- Les origines du recueil des "historiens des croisades" (1919). A study of the origins of Recueil des historiens descroisades.
- Le consul orientaliste Joseph Rousseau (1936). An account of the work of French orientalist Jean-Baptiste Rousseau (1780-1831).
- Silvestre de Sacy et l'enseignement de l'arabe à Marseille (1937).

Charles Wendell David. Charles Wendell David (1885–1984), an American medievalist.

- Robert Curthose, Duke of Normandy (1920). A biography of Robert Curthose, the eldest son of William the Conqueror.

E. S. Bouchier. Edmund Spenser Bouchier (born 1876), a British historian.

- A Short History of Antioch, 300 B. C.–A. D. 1268. Includes the history of the Principality of Antioch through the Siege of Antioch of 1268.

Winston Churchill. Sir Winston Leonard Spencer Churchill (1874–1965), a British statesman, army officer, and writer.

- A History of the English-Speaking Peoples, 4 volumes (1956–1958). A history of Great Britain and America from 55 BC through 1902. The first volume, The Birth of Britain, includes a chapter on Richard I of England and the Third Crusade.

Kate Norgate. Kate Norgate (1853–1935), a British historian and one of the first women to achieve comparable academic success. She is best known for her history of England under the Angevin kings and for coining the name Angevin Empire to describe their domains.

- Richard the Lion Heart (1924). A biography of Richard I of England.

René Grousset. René Grousset (1885–1952), a French historian.

- The Epic of the Crusades (1926). Translation of L'épopée des Croisades by Noël Lindsay (1970). Two centuries of history of the Frankish kingdom of Jerusalem and nine Crusades which marked two extraordinary centuries, from 1095 to 1291, in the history of the Christian West and of Islam.
- Histoire des croisades et du royaume franc de Jérusalem, 3 volumes (1934-1936). The translation of Histoire, The History of the Crusades, was a standard reference of the subject. (cf. French Wikipedia, Histoire des croisades et du royaume franc de Jérusalem)
- L'empire mongol (1941). A history of the Mongol empire.
- L'empire du Levant: histoire de la question d'Orient (1946). For René Grousset, the question of the Orient is the problem of relations between Europe and Asia. He first shows in this historical sketch what was the legacy of Antiquity and what, at the advent of the Christian empire, around 323, remained from the results of the Alexandrian conquest. The history of these east–west relations is then studied in its three successive aspects: Byzantine solution in the early Middle Ages, Frankish solution from the thirteenth to the fifteenth century, Turkish solution from 1360 and especially from 1453.
- Histoire de l'Arménie des origines à 1071 (1947).

H. A. R. Gibb. H. A. R. Gibb (1895–1971), a Scottish historian on orientalism.

- Arabic Literature – An Introduction (1926).
- Travels of Ibn Battuta, A.D. 1325-1354 (1929). Translation of Rihla (Voyages), the travelogue of Moroccan scholar and explorer Ibn Battūta (1304–1369). Translated by Charles Defrémery (1822–1883), B. R. Sanguinetti (1811–1883) and H. A. R. Gibb (1895–1971).
- The Damascus Chronicle of the Crusades (1932). Extracted and translated from the Dhayl tārīkh Dimashq (Chronicle of Damascus from 1097 to 1159) of Arab historian ibn al-Qalānisi (c. 1071 – 1160).
- Modern Trends in Islam (1947). French edition Les tendances modernes de l'Islam translated by Bernard Vernier.
- Mohammedanism: An Historical Survey (1949).

Anton Chroust. Anton Chroust (1864–1945), a German historian. (cf. German Wikipedia, Anton Chroust)

- Quellen zur Geschichte des Kreuzzüges Kaiser Friedrichs I, 1 volume (1928). Sources on the history of Frederick I on the Third Crusade. Includes Historia de expeditione Friderici imperatoris, Historia Peregrinorum and Epistola de morte Friderici imperatoris.

John L. La Monte. John L. La Monte (1902–1949), an American historian.

- Feudal Monarchy in the Latin Kingdom of Jerusalem, 1100–1291 (1932).
- The Wars of Frederick II against the Ibelins in Syria and Cyprus by Philip de Novare (1936).
- A syllabus and reading list to accompany Carl Stephenson's Mediæval History (1936). Companion to Mediæval History: Europe from the Fourth to the Sixteenth Century (1935) by American historian Carl Stephenson (1886–1954).
- The Noble Houses of Outremer (1937). Genealogical and biographical studies of the Crusading States.
- Some Problems in Crusading Historiography (1940). In Speculum, Volume 15.

Paul Deschamps. Paul Deschamps (1888–1974), a French medieval historian.

- Les Châteaux des Croisés en Terre Sainte (1934–1939).
- Terre Sainte Romane (1964).

Carl Erdmann. Carl Erdmann (1898–1945), a German historian specializing in medieval political and intellectual history.

- Die Entstehung des Kreuzzugsgedankens (1935).
- The Origin of the Idea of Crusade (1977). Translation of Die Entstehung des Kreuzzugsgedankens by Marshall W. Baldwin (1903–1975) and Walter Goffart (1934–2025). Forward and introductory notes by Baldwin.

Joseph Reese Strayer. Joseph Reese Strayer (1904–1987), an American medievalist historian.

- A Syllabus of Medieval History, 395-1500 (1942). Includes chapters of chivalry, the Byzantine empire, the Saracen empires, and the Crusades. Extension of A Syllabus of Medieval History, 395-1300 (1899) by American historian Dana C. Munro (1866–1933).
- The Albigensian Crusade (1972). An account of the Albigensian Crusade of 1209–1229, with an epilog by Carol Lansing.

== Comprehensive studies ==
In the later half of the 20th century, a number of key, comprehensive studies of the Crusades were published. These works provide the basis of Crusader studies and were authored by many of the more prominent historians discussed here.

Runciman's History of the Crusades. A History of the Crusades is the first modern, comprehensive review of the Crusades published after 1950. It was written by Sir James Cochran Stevenson (Steven) Runciman (1903–2000), a British historian of the Middle Ages, specializing in the Crusades and the Byzantine empire. (cf. French Wikipedia, Steven Runciman). The work consists of three volumes covering the history of the Holy Land, including pilgrimages to Jerusalem and the rise of the Islamic caliphates and sultanates. The Crusades are covered from the First Crusade until 1464.

- A History of the Crusades, Volume One: The First Crusade and the Foundation of the Kingdom of Jerusalem (1951).
- A History of the Crusades, Volume Two: The Kingdom of Jerusalem and the Frankish East, 1100-1187 (1952).
- A History of the Crusades, Volume Three: The Kingdom of Acre and the Later Crusades (1954).

Wisconsin Collaborative History. The Wisconsin Collaborative History of the Crusades, 6 volumes (1969–1989). Under the general editorship of Kenneth M. Setton.

- Volume I. The First One Hundred Years (1969). Edited by Marshall W. Baldwin. Western Europe, Byzantium, the Assassins and the Holy Land before the Crusades. The First Crusade, the Crusade of 1101, the kingdom of Jerusalem from 1101 to 1146, with the loss of Edessa. The Second Crusade and afterward. The rise of Saladin and the loss of Jerusalem.
- Volume II. The Later Crusades, 1189–1311 (1969). Edited by Robert L. Wolff and Harry W. Hazard. The Norman kingdom of Sicily. The Third Crusade. The Fourth Crusade. The Latin Empire of Constantinople and the Frankish states in Greece. The Albigensian Crusade. The Children's Crusade. The Fifth Crusade. The Sixth Crusade. The Baron's Crusade. The Crusades of Louis IX. The Ayyubids. The Mongols. The Mamluks.
- Volume III. The Fourteenth and Fifteen Centuries (1975). Edited by Harry W. Hazard. Crusades in the fourteenth century. Byzantium and the Crusades. The Morea. The Catalans and Florentines in Greece. The Hospitallers at Rhodes. The kingdom of Cyprus. The Reconquista. The Mamluks. The Mongols. The German Crusade in the Baltics. The Crusade against the Hussites.
- Volume IV. The Art and Architecture of the Crusader States (1979). Edited by Harry W. Hazard. Life in Palestine and Syria. Pilgrimages and shrines. Ecclesiastical art. Military architecture. Arts in the Latin Kingdom of Jerusalem, Cyprus and Rhodes.
- Volume V. The Impact of the Crusades on the Near East (1985). Edited by Norman P. Zacour and Harry W. Hazard (1918-1989). Impact on Muslim lands. Social classes. Political and ecclesiastical organization of the Crusader States. Agriculture. Teutonic Knights. Venice and the Crusades. Missions to the East.
- Volume VI. The Impact of the Crusades on Europe (1989). Edited by Norman P. Zacour and Harry W. Hazard (1918-1989). Legal and political theory. Crusader propaganda. Financing. Institutions of the kingdom of Cyprus. Social evolution in Latin Greece. The Ottoman Turks. The Crusade of Varna. Coinage.
- Select Bibliography on the Crusades. Compiled by Hans E. Mayer and Joyce McLellan. Edited by Harry W. Hazard.

The Crusades—An Encyclopedia. The Crusades—An Encyclopedia (2006). Edited by historian Alan V. Murray. A comprehensive treatment of the Crusades with over 1000 entries written by 120 authors from 25 countries. Highlights include entries by the following historians.

- American historian James M. Powell, Editorial Consultant on the work
- British academic Anna Sapir Abulafia who specializes in medieval Christian-Jewish relations.
- British medieval historian Malcolm Barber, a leading expert on the Knights Templar.
- Canadian historian Niall Christie, specializing on Islamic sources of the Crusades.
- British historian Susan B. Edgington, with works on original Western sources of the Crusades.
- Egyptian historian Taef El-Azhari, specializing in the history of the Seljuk and Zengid dynasties.
- Italian historian Laura Minervini, an expert on the Gestes des Chiprois.
- French historian Jean Richard, a medievalist.
- British historian Jonathan Phillips, author of numerous works on the First, Second and Fourth Crusades.
- British historian Jonathan Riley-Smith, a widely published expert on the Crusades; member of the Editorial Advisory Board.
- British historian J. Elizabeth Siberry, a scholar on Crusader literature.
- British historian Christopher J. Tyerman (born 1953), a prominent expert on the Crusades.

The Oxford History of the Crusades. The Oxford History of the Crusades (1995). Edited by Jonathan Riley-Smith (1938–2016), a British historian of the Crusades. A series of essays on the Crusades by contemporary historians as follows.

- The Crusading Movement and Historians, by Jonathan Riley-Smith.
- Origins [of the Crusades], by British historian Marcus G. Bull.
- The Crusading Movement, 1096–1274, by British historian Simon Lloyd.
- The State of Mind of Crusaders to the East, 1095–1300, by Jonathan Riley-Smith.
- Songs [of the Crusades], by Michael J. Routledge.
- The Latin East, 1098–1291, by British medievalist Jonathan P. Phillips.
- Art in the Latin East, 1098–1291, by American art historian Jaroslav T. Folda III (born 1940).
- Architecture in the Latin East, 1098–1571, by British archeologist Denys Pringle.
- The Military Orders, 1120–1312, by British historian Alan J. Forey.
- Islam and the Crusades, 1096–1699, by British historian Robert Irwin.
- The Crusading Movement, 1274–1700, by British historian Norman Housley.
- The Latin East, 1291–1669, by British historian Peter W. Edbury.
- The Military Orders, 1312–1798, by historian Anthony T. Luttrell.
- Images of the Crusades in the Nineteenth and Twentieth Centuries, by British historian J. Elizabeth Siberry.
- Revival and Survival, by Jonathan Riley-Smith.
- Chronology and Maps.

God's War. God's War: A New History of the Crusades (2006) is a 21st-century comprehensive study of the Crusades by British Crusader historian Christopher Tyerman (born 1953)The dust jacket announces God's War as "the definitive account of a fascinating and horrifying story" and compares it to Runciman's "well-loved and much-published classic study of the Crusades."

== Historians after the mid-Twentieth century ==
Individual historians from the later 20th century through the current time include the following.

Anna Sapir Abulafia. Anna Brechta Sapir Abulafia (born 1952), a British academic who specializes in religious history.

- Christians and Jews in the Twelfth-Century Renaissance (1995).
- Hebrew Sources (2006). In The Crusades—An Encyclopedia.

Eugene N. Anderson. Eugene Newton Anderson (1900-1984), an American historian.

- Medieval and historiographical essays: in honor of James Westfall Thompson (1938). Edited by E. Anderson and James L. Cate.
- History of Western Civilization (1957).

Arthur John Arberry. Arthur John Arberry (1905–1969), a British orientalist.

- A volume in the autograph of Yāqūt the geographer (1951). A brief description of the work of Arab scholar Yaqut al-Hamawi (1179–1229), with a reproduction of the manuscript of the Tamām Fasīh al-kalām of Ahmad ibn Fāris.

Thomas S. Asbridge. Thomas S. Asbridge, a British medieval historian.

- The Creation of the Principality of Antioch, 1098-1130 (2000)
- The First Crusade: A New History: The Roots of Conflict between Christianity and Islam (2005).
- The Crusades: The Authoritative History of the War for the Holy Land (2010).
- Works from the HathiTrust bibliographic catalogs
- Historians of the Crusades (2007–2008), an on-line database of scholars working in the field of Crusader studies. This is part of the Resources for Studying the Crusades created at Queen Mary University of London in 2007–2008.

Aziz Suryal Atiya. Aziz Suryal Atiya (1898–1988), an Egyptian Coptologist and historian specializing in Islamic and Crusades studies.

- The Crusade of Nicopolis (1934). An account of the battle of Nicopolis in 1396.
- The Crusade in the Later Middle Ages (1938). Includes five appendixes: Petitio pro recuperatione Terrae Sanctae; Pilgrims and travelers; Aragon and Egypt; Lists of the crusaders; and Chronological tables.
- Review of A History of the Crusades, by S. Runciman (1952). Speculum, 27(3), 422–425.
- The Crusade (1962).
- The Crusade: Historiography and Bibliography (1962).
- Kitāb al-Ilmām, 7 volumes (1968–1976). A history of Alexandria by al-Nuwayrī (fl. 1365–1373) edited by Atiya and Swiss Egyptologist Étienne Combe (1881–1962).
- The Crusade in the Fourteenth Century (1975). In the Wisconsin Collaborative History of the Crusades, Volume III. The Fourteenth and Fifteenth Centuries.
- The Aftermath of the Crusades (1975). In the Wisconsin Collaborative History of the Crusades, Volume III. The Fourteenth and Fifteenth Centuries.
- The Coptic Encyclopedia, 8 volumes (1991). Editor-in-chief.

Marshall W. Baldwin. Marshall Whithed Baldwin (1903–1975), an American historian who was Professor Emeritus of History at New York University until his death.

- Wisconsin Collaborative History of the Crusades, 6 volumes (1969-1989), under the general editorship of Kenneth M. Setton (1914–1995). Volume I. The First One Hundred Years (1969). Edited by M. Baldwin: Western Europe, Byzantium, the Assassins and the Holy Land before the Crusades. The First Crusade, the Crusade of 1101, the kingdom of Jerusalem from 1101 to 1146, with the loss of Edessa. The Second Crusade and afterward. The rise of Saladin and the loss of Jerusalem.
- The Latin States under Baldwin III and Amalric I, 1143–1174. (1969). In the Wisconsin Collaborative History of the Crusades, Volume I. The First One Hundred Years.
- The Decline and Fall of Jerusalem, 1174–1189 (1969). In the Wisconsin Collaborative History of the Crusades, Volume I. The First One Hundred Years.
- The Origin of the Idea of Crusade (1977), by Carl Erdmann (1898–1945). Translation by M. Baldwin and Walter Goffart (born 1934).
- Missions to the East in the Thirteenth and Fourteenth Centuries (1985). In the Wisconsin Collaborative History of the Crusades, Volume V, The Impact of the Crusades on the Near East.

Malcolm Barber. Malcolm Barber (born 1943), a British medieval historian and leading expert on the Knights Templar.

- The Trial of the Templars (1978).
- The New Knighthood: A History of the Order of the Temple (1994).
- The Military Orders, Volume I: Fighting for the Faith and Caring for the Sick (1994). Edited by M. Barber.
- Petrus Vallium Sarnaii (2016). In the Encyclopedia of the Medieval Chronicle.
- Letters from the East: Crusaders, Pilgrims and Settlers in the 12th–13th Centuries (2016). With Keith Bate.

Richard Barber. Richard William Barber (born 1941), a British historian specializing in medieval history and literature.

- The Knight and Chivalry (1971)
- Tournaments: Jousts, Chivalry and Pageants in the Middle Ages (1989). With English historian Juliet Barker.
- The Holy Grail: Imagination and Belief (2004)
- The Reign of Chivalry (2005).

Ernest Barker. Ernest Barker (1874–1960), an English political scientist.

- Crusades (1911), in the 11th edition of the Encyclopædia Britannica. A summary of the history of the Crusades, with sections on the Meaning of the Crusades, Historical Causes of the Crusades, and Literature of Crusades.
- The Crusades (1923). A later edition of the Encyclopædia Britannica article, edited with additional notes.
- List of Contributions of Barker to the Encyclopædia Britannica 11th Edition.
- Bibliography of works by Barker (1906–1956).

Virginia G. Berry. Virginia G. Berry, a Canadian historian.

- The Journey of Louis VII to the East (1948). The English translation of De profectione Ludovico VII in Orientem, an edition of the eyewitness account of the ill-fated Second Crusade by Odo of Deuil, chaplain to the French king, Louis VII, contains many details, including views of contesting factions, decisive facts about the battles, and accounts of Greek customs and Turkish modes of combat.
- Peter the Venerable and the Crusades (1956). A biography of Peter the Venerable (c. 1092 – 1156).
- The Second Crusade (1969). In the Wisconsin Collaborative History of the Crusades, Volume I. The First One Hundred Years.

Charles Julian Bishko. Charles Julian Bishko, an American historian specializing on medieval Spain.

- The Spanish and Portuguese Reconquest, 1095-1492 (1975). In the Wisconsin Collaborative History of the Crusades, Volume III. The Fourteenth and Fifteenth Centuries.

Sheila Blair. Sheila Blair (born 1948), an American scholar of Islamic art.

- A Compendium of Chronicles: Rashid al-Din's Illustrated History of the World (1995). An illustrated (59 folios) edition of Jāmiʿ al-Tawārīkh (Compendium of Chronicles) by Persian historian Rashid-al-Din Hamadani (1247–1318). The commentary traces the compendium's history from the scriptorium in Tabriz, through Herat during the Timurid dynasty, through the 19th-century Mughal court and the East India Company, to its final acquisition by the Royal Asiatic Society. Includes a translation by Wheeler Thackson of the articles of endowment of the Rabi’ Rashid. Volume XXVII of the Khalili Collection of Islamic Art.
- Arab Inscriptions in Persia (1998). In Encyclopædia Iranica's article on Epigraphy.
- Būyid Art and Architecture (2009).

T. S. R. Boase. Thomas Sherrer Ross (T. S. R.) Boase (1898–1974), a British art historian.

- Boniface VIII (1933). A biography of pope Boniface VIII.
- Recent Developments in Crusading Historiography (1937). In History, Volume 22.
- The Cilician Kingdom of Armenia (1978).
- Ecclesiastical Art in the Crusader States in Palestine and Syria (1979). In the Wisconsin Collaborative History of the Crusades, Volume IV. The Art and Architecture of the Crusader States.
- Military Architecture in the Crusader States in Palestine and Syria (1979). In the Wisconsin Collaborative History of the Crusades, Volume IV. The Art and Architecture of the Crusader States.

Clifford Edmund (C. E.) Bosworth. Clifford Edmund Bosworth (1928–2015), an English historian and orientalist, specializing in Arabic and Iranian studies.

- The Transition from Ghaznavid to Seljuq Rule in the Islamic East (1961). Ph.D dissertation, University of Edinburgh.
- The Early Ghaznavids (1975). Chapter 5 of The Cambridge History of Iran, Volume 4.
- The Ghaznavids, their Empire in Afghanistan and Eastern Iran 994–1040 (1963). The first part of a history of the Ghaznavid empire.
- The Later Ghaznavids, Splendour and Decay: the dynasty in Afghanistan and northern India 1040–1186. (1977). The second part of the history of the Ghaznavids.
- The New Islamic Dynasties. A chronological and genealogical manual (1996).

Louis R. Bréhier. Louis R. Bréhier (1869–1951), a French historian specializing in Byzantine studies.

- Crusades (1908). In the Catholic Encyclopedia (1907–1912), edited by Charles G. Herbermann (1840–1916). An overview of the history of the Crusades, numbered as eight. Topics include: I. Origin of the Crusades; II. Foundation of Christian states in the East; III. First destruction of the Christian states (1144-1187); IV. Attempts to restore the Christian states and the Crusade against Saint-Jean d'Acre (1192-1198); V. The Crusade against Constantinople (1204); VI. The thirteenth-century Crusades (1217-1252); VII. Final loss of the Christian colonies of the East (1254-1291); VIII. The fourteenth-century Crusade and the Ottoman invasion; IX. The Crusade in the fifteenth century; X. Modifications and survival of the idea of the Crusade.
- Crusades (Bibliography and Sources) (1908). In the Catholic Encyclopedia. A concise summary of the historiography of the Crusades.
- L'Église et l'Orient au Moyen Âge: Les Croisades (1907). The Church and the East in the Middle Ages: The Crusades, including an extensive bibliography. Covers the Holy Land from before the Crusades, including the role of Holy relics, Charlemagne's role in the Middle East, and the destruction of the Church of the Holy Sepulchre in 1109; the Crusades through 1291; and later activities through 1453.
- Latin Kingdom of Jerusalem (1099-1291). In the Catholic Encyclopedia.
- Crusade of the Pastoureaux (1911). An account of the First Shepherds’ Crusade (1251). In the Catholic Encyclopedia.
- Histoire anonyme de la première croisade (1924). A translation of the anonymous account of the First Crusade, Gesta Francorum (Deeds of the Franks).
- List of Contributions of Bréhier to the Catholic Encyclopedia (1908–1913).
- Bibliography of works by Bréhier (1899–1950).
- Works of Bréhier from the HathiTrust bibliographic catalog (1899–1950).

James A. Brundage. James Arthur Brundage, an American historian specializing in the Crusades.

- The Crusades: A Documentary Survey (1962). Translations (various translators) from original documentary accounts of the times woven together with narrative introductions.
- The Crusades, Motives and Achievements (1964).
- Recent Crusade Historiography: Some Observations and Suggestions (1964). In Catholic Historical Review (CHR) 49.

Marcus G. Bull. Marcus Graham Bull, a British historian.

- Knightly Piety and the Lay Response to the First Crusade (1993).
- Origins [of the Crusades] (1995). In The Oxford History of the Crusades, edited by J. Riley-Smith.

Claude Cahen. Claude Cahen (1909–1991), a French orientalist and historian, specializing in the studies of the Islamic Middle Ages and Crusades sources.

- La Syrie du nord à l'époque des croisades et la principauté franque d'Antioche (1940).
- Historiography of the Seljuqid period (1962).
- The Turkish Invasion: The Selchuükids (1969). In the Wisconsin Collaborative History of the Crusades, Volume I. The First One Hundred Years.
- The Turks in Iran and Anatolia before the Mongol Invasions (1969). In the Wisconsin Collaborative History of the Crusades, Volume II, The Later Crusades 1187–1311.
- The Mongols and the Near East (1969). In the Wisconsin Collaborative History of the Crusades, Volume II, The Later Crusades 1187–1311.
- Tribes, Cities and Social Organizations (1975). Chapter 8 of The Cambridge History of Iran, Volume 4.
- The Formation of Turkey: the Seljukid Sultanate of Rūm: eleventh to fourteenth century (2001). With Peter M Holt.

James Lea Cate. James Lea Cate (1899-1981), an American historian and part of the Air Force Historical Division during World War II.

- Medieval and historiographical essays: in honor of James Westfall Thompson (1938). Edited by J. Cate and Eugene N. Anderson.
- The Crusade of 1101 (1969). In the Wisconsin Collaborative History of the Crusades, Volume I. The First One Hundred Years.

Fred A. Cazel. Fred A. Cazel (1921–2011), an American historian.

- Financing the Crusades (1989). In the Wisconsin Collaborative History of the Crusades, Volume VI. The Impact of the Crusades on Europe.

Peter Charanis. Peter Charanis (1908–1985), a Greek-born American scholar of Byzantium.

- The Byzantine Empire in the Eleventh Century (1969). In the Wisconsin Collaborative History of the Crusades, Volume I. The First One Hundred Years.

Martin Chasin. Martin Chasin, an American historian.

- The Crusade of Varna (1989). In the Wisconsin Collaborative History of the Crusades, Volume VI. The Impact of the Crusades on Europe.

Niall Christie. Niall Christie, an English historian of the Crusades.

- Muslims and Crusaders: Christianity's Wars in the Middle East, 1095–1382, from the Islamic Sources (2014).

Paul M. Cobb. Paul M. Cobb (born 1967), an American historian of the medieval Islamic world.

- The Race for Paradise: An Islamic History of the Crusades (2014).

Giles Constable. Giles Constable (born 1929), a British historian and medievalist.

- Monks, Hermits and Crusaders in Medieval Europe (1978).
- Cluny from the Tenth to the Twelfth Centuries, Further studies (2000).
- The Historiography of the Crusades (2001), In The Crusades from the Perspective of Byzantium and the Muslim World.

Eugene L. Cox. Eugene L. Cox, an American historian.

- The Green Count of Savoy (1967). A biography of Amadeus VI of Savoy.

Farhad Daftary. Farhad Daftary (born 1938), an American historian specializing on medieval Persian history and the Isma'ili branch of Shia Islam.

- The Isma'ilis: Their History and Doctrines (1992).
- Encyclopædia Iranica (2008). Edited by F. Daftary.

Norman Daniel. Norman Daniel (c. 1919 – 1992), a British historian.

- The Critical Approach to Arab Society in the Middle Ages (1981).
- The Legal and Political Theory of the Crusade (1989). In the Wisconsin Collaborative History of the Crusades, Volume VI. The Impact of the Crusades on Europe.
- Crusader Propaganda (1989). In the Wisconsin Collaborative History of the Crusades, Volume VI. The Impact of the Crusades on Europe.

Frederic Duncalf. Frederic Duncalf (1882–1963), an American historian of the First Crusade.

- A problem in the use of parallel source material in medieval history: the capture of Jerusalem in 1099 (1912).
- The Peasants Crusade (1921). An account of the People's Crusade.
- The Councils of Piacenza and Clermont (1969). In the Wisconsin Collaborative History of the Crusades, Volume I. The First One Hundred Years.
- The First Crusade: Clermont to Constantinople (1969). In the Wisconsin Collaborative History of the Crusades, Volume I. The First One Hundred Years.

Peter W. Edbury. Peter W. Edbury (born 1947), A British historian.

- The Kingdom of Cyprus and the Crusades, 1191-1374 (1991).
- The Conquest of Jerusalem and the Third Crusade (1996). A complete collection of the key texts describing Saladin's conquest of Jerusalem in October 1187 and the Third Crusade. Includes a translation of the Old French Continuation of William Tyre for the years 1184–1197.

Susan B. Edgington. Susan B. Edgington, a British historian.

- Gendering the Crusades (2001).
- The First Crusade: the Capture of Jerusalem in AD 1099 (2003).
- Western Sources (2006). With Alan V. Murray. In The Crusades—An Encyclopedia.
- Jerusalem the Golden: the Origins and Impact of the First Crusade (2014).
- Crusading Chronicles (2016). In the Encyclopedia of the Medieval Chronicle.
- Baldwin I of Jerusalem, 1100–1118 (2019).

Carl Erdmann. Carl Erdmann (1898–1945), a German historian specializing in medieval political and intellectual history.

- Die Entstehung des Kreuzzugsgedankens (1935).
- The Origin of the Idea of Crusade (1977). Translation of Die Entstehung des Kreuzzugsgedankens by Marshall W. Baldwin (1903–1975) and Walter Goffart (born 1934). Forward and introductory notes by Baldwin.

Austin P. Evans. Austin Patterson Evans, an American medieval historian.

- Bibliography of English translations from Medieval Sources (1946). By Austin P. Evans and Clarissa Palmer Farrar (1899–1963).
- Heresies of the high Middle Ages (1969). With Walter Leggett Wakefield.
- The Albigensian Crusade (1969). In the Wisconsin Collaborative History of the Crusades, Volume II, The Later Crusades 1187–1311.

Nabīh Amīn Fāris. Nabīh Amīn Fāris (1906–1968), an Arab historian.

- Descriptive catalog of the Garrett collection of Arabic manuscripts in the Princeton University library (1938). With Philip Khuri Hitti.
- The Book of Idols (1952). A translation from the Arabic of the work of Hisham Ibn al-Kalbī by Nabih Amin Faris.
- Arab Culture in the Twelfth Century (1985). In the Wisconsin Collaborative History of the Crusades, Volume V, The Impact of the Crusades on the Near East.

Harold S. Fink. Harold S. Fink (1903–1981), an American historian.

- A History of the Expedition to Jerusalem, 1095-1127 (1969). A translation of Gesta Francorum Iherusalem Perefrinantium (Historia Hierosolymitana) by Fulcher of Chartres (c. 1059 – after 1128).
- The Foundation of the Latin States, 1099–1118 (1969). In the Wisconsin Collaborative History of the Crusades, Volume I. The First One Hundred Years.

Jean Flori. Jean Flori (1936–2018), a French medieval historian.

- Les croisades (1999).
- Pierre l'Ermite et la première Croisade (1999).

Alan John Forey. Alan John Forey (born 1933), a British historian and an authority on the history of the military orders of the Middle Ages.

- The Military Orders from the Twelfth to the Early Fourteenth Centuries (1992)
- The Military Orders, 1120–1312 (1995). In the Oxford History of the Crusades.

Alfred Foulet. Alfred Foulet (1900–1987), a French historian.

- Lettres françaises du XIIIe siècle (1924). An edition of the work of Jean Pierre Sarrasin (died 1275) concerning letters from the Seventh Crusade.
- Le Couronnement de Renard, poème du treizième siècle (1929). An edition of the cycle of Reynard the Fox.
- The Epic Cycle of the Crusades (1989). In the Wisconsin Collaborative History of the Crusades, Volume VI. The Impact of the Crusades on Europe.

Elizabeth Chapin Furber. Elizabeth Chapin Furber, an American historian.

- The Kingdom of Cyprus, 1191–1291 (1969). In the Wisconsin Collaborative History of the Crusades, Volume II, The Later Crusades 1187–1311.

Richard N. Frye. Richard Nelson Frye (1920–2014), an American scholar of Iranian and Central Asian studies.

- The Cambridge History of Iran, Volume 4: From the Arab Invasion to the Saljuks (1975).

Francesco Gabrieli. Francesco Gabrieli (1904–1996), an Italian Arabist and orientalist.

- Arabic Historiography of the Crusades (1962)
- Arab Historians of the Crusades (1969).

Deno Geanakoplos. Deno John Geanakoplos (1916–2007), an American scholar of Byzantine cultural and religious history and Italian Renaissance intellectual history.

- Greek scholars in Venice: studies in the dissemination of Greek learning from Byzantium to Western Europe (1962).
- Byzantium and the Crusades, 1261–1354 (1975). In the Wisconsin Collaborative History of the Crusades, Volume III. The Fourteenth and Fifteenth Centuries.
- Byzantium and the Crusades, 1354–1453 (1975). Ibid.

H. A. R. Gibb. H. A. R. Gibb (1895–1971), a Scottish historian on orientalism.

- Arabic Literature – An Introduction (1926).
- Travels of Ibn Battuta, A.D. 1325-1354 (1929). Translation of Rihla (Voyages), the travelogue of Moroccan scholar and explorer Ibn Battūta (1304–1369). Translated by Charles Defrémery (1822–1883), B. R. Sanguinetti (1811–1883) and H. A. R. Gibb (1895–1971).
- The Damascus Chronicle of the Crusades (1932). Extracted and translated from the Dhayl tārīkh Dimashq (Chronicle of Damascus from 1097 to 1159) of Arab historian ibn al-Qalānisi (c. 1071 – 1160).
- Modern Trends in Islam (1947). French edition Les tendances modernes de l'Islam translated by Bernard Vernier.
- Mohammedanism: An Historical Survey (1949).
- Islamic Society and the West, with Harold Bowen, 2 volumes (1950, 1957)
- Encyclopaedia of Islam, 11 volumes (1954– ). Edited by a number of leading orientalists including H. A. R. Gibb.
- The Caliphate and the Arab States (1969). In the Wisconsin Collaborative History of the Crusades, Volume I. The First One Hundred Years.
- Zengi and the Fall of Edessa (1969). An account of Turkish atabeg Zengi (1085–1146), founder of the Zengid dynasty, and his successful siege of Edessa in 1144 that triggered the Second Crusade. In the Wisconsin Collaborative History of the Crusades, Volume I. The First One Hundred Years.
- The Aiyūbids (1969). In the Wisconsin Collaborative History of the Crusades, Volume II, The Later Crusades 1187–1311.
- The Career of Nūr-ad-Din (1969). An account of Nur ad-Din (1118–1174), the son of Zengi and successor to the Zengid dynasty. In the Wisconsin Collaborative History of the Crusades, Volume I. The First One Hundred Years.
- The Rise of Saladin, 1169–1189 (1969). In the Wisconsin Collaborative History of the Crusades, Volume I. The First One Hundred Years.
- Saladin–Studies in Islamic History (1974). Edited by H. A. R. Gibb and Yusuf Ibish.

Keith R. Giles. Keith Richard Giles is a British historian of the Crusades.

- The Emperor Frederick II's Crusade, c. 1215 – c. 1231 (1987).

John Gillingham. John Gillingham (born 1940), a British historian specializing in the Angevin Empire.

- Richard I (1999). A biography of Richard I of England.

Harry W. Hazard. Harry W. Hazard (1918-1989), an American numismatist and historian of the Crusades.

- The Numismatic History of Late Medieval North Africa (1952). Prepared for the American Numismatic Society.
- Wisconsin Collaborative History of the Crusades, 6 volumes (1969-1989). Under the general editorship of Kenneth M. Setton. Volumes II–VI edited by H. Hazard.
- Moslem North Africa, 1049–1394 (1975). In the Wisconsin Collaborative History of the Crusades, Volume III. The Fourteenth and Fifteenth Centuries.
- Select Bibliography on the Crusades (1989). Compiled by Hans E. Mayer and Joyce McLellan, and edited by H. W. Hazard.

Frederick G. Heymann. Frederick Gotthold Heymann (1900–1983), a Canadian historian.

- The Crusades against the Hussites (1975). In the Wisconsin Collaborative History of the Crusades, Volume III. The Fourteenth and Fifteenth Centuries.

Carole Hillenbrand. Carole Hillenbrand (born 1943), a British Islamic scholar.

- History of the Jazira, 1100–1150: The Contribution of ibn al-Azraq al-Fariq (1979). Translations of the two existing manuscripts of Ta'rikh Mayyafariqin wa-Amid (The history of Mayyafariqin and Amid) by historian ibn al-Azraq al-Fāriqī (1116–1176), with annotations and commentary. Ph.D thesis, University of Edinburgh.
- A Muslim Principality in Crusader Times: the Early Artuqid state (1990). Based on History of the Jazira, 1100–1150.
- The Crusades: Islamic Perspectives (2000). Discusses themes that highlight how Muslims reacted to the presence of the Crusaders in the heart of traditionally Islamic territory. Examines ideological concerns and the importance of the jihad in the context of the gradual recovery of the Holy Land and the expulsion of the Crusaders.

Philip Khuri Hitti. Philip Khuri Hitti (1886–1978), a Lebanese-American authority on Arab and Middle Eastern history, Islam, and Semitic languages, helping to create the discipline of Arabic studies in the United States.

- The Origins of the Islamic State, 2 volumes (1916–1924). A translation from the Arabic accompanied with annotations, geographic and historic notes of the Kitāb Futūḥ al-Buldān (The Conquest of Nations), an early history of the Caliphate, of al-Imâm al-Balādhuri.
- An Arab-Syrian Gentleman in the Period of the Crusades: Memoirs of Usamah ibn-Munqidh (1929). A translation of Kitab al-I'tibar, the autobiography of Arab historian Usama ibn-Munqidh (1095–1188).
- History of the Arabs (1937). A history covering the pre-Islamic period; the rise of Islam; the Umayyad and Abbasid caliphates; Moslems in Europe; and the Fatimid, Ayyubid and Mamluk dynasties.
- Descriptive catalog of the Garrett collection of Arabic manuscripts in the Princeton University library (1938). With Nabīh Amīn Fāris.
- History of the Arabs: from the earliest times to the present (1943).
- The Impact of the Crusades on Moslem Lands (1985). In the Wisconsin Collaborative History of the Crusades, Volume V, The Impact of the Crusades on the Near East.

Natasha Hodgson Natasha Hodgson, a British Historian specializing in the history of the Crusades.

- Women, crusading and the Holy Land in historical narrative (2007).
- Crusading and Masculinities (2019). Edited with Katherine J. Lewis and Matthew M. Mesley.
- Works by Natasha Hodgson

Urban Tigner Holmes. Urban Tigner Holmes Jr. (1900–1972), an American scholar focusing on medieval literature and romance philology.

- A History of Old French Literature, from the Origins to 1300 (1937).
- A New Interpretation of Chrétien's Conte del Graal (1948). A controversial interpretation of Chrétien de Troyes' 12th century romance Perceval, the Story of the Grail. With Sister Amelia Klenke.
- Life among the Europeans in Palestine and Syrian in the Twelfth and Thirteenth Centuries (1979). In the Wisconsin Collaborative History of the Crusades, Volume IV. The Art and Architecture of the Crusader States.

Peter Holt. Peter Malcolm Holt (1918– 2006), a historian of the Middle East.

- The Cambridge History of Islam (1992). Edited by P. Holt.
- The Crusaders States and their Neighbours, 1098-1291 (2004).

Norman Housley. Norman Housley, a British historian specializing in the Crusades.

- The Later Crusades, 1274-1580: From Lyons to Alcazar (1992).
- The Crusading Movement, 1274–1700. (1995).
- The Italian Crusades: The Papal-Angevin Alliance and the Crusades Against Christian Lay Powers, 1254-1343 (1982).

Kathryn Hurlock. Kathryn Hurlock, a British historian specializing in the role of crusades in medieval British life and the impact of warfare.

- Wales and the Crusades, c.1095-1291 (2011)
- Britain, Ireland and the Crusades, c.1000-1300 (2013)
- Crusading and Pilgrimage in the Norman World (2018). Edited with Paul Oldfield.
- Works by Kathryn Hurlock

Joan M. Hussey. Joan Mervyn Hussey (1907–2006), a British Byzantine scholar and historian.

- The Byzantine Empire in the eleventh century: some different interpretations (1950).
- The Byzantine World (1957).
- The Cambridge Medieval History. Volume IV, The Byzantine Empire (1966). Second edition, edited by J. Hussey.
- Byzantium and the Crusades, 1081–1204 (1969). In the Wisconsin Collaborative History of the Crusades, Volume II, The Later Crusades 1187–1311.

Halil İnalcık. Halil İnalcık (1916–2016), a Turkish historian of the Ottoman Empire.

- The Ottoman Turks and the Crusades, 1329–1451 (1989). In the Wisconsin Collaborative History of the Crusades, Volume VI. The Impact of the Crusades on Europe.
- The Ottoman Turks and the Crusades, 1451–1522 (1989). In the Wisconsin Collaborative History of the Crusades, Volume VI. The Impact of the Crusades on Europe.

David Jacoby. David Jacoby (1928-2018), an Israeli historian of medieval studies.

- Studies on the Crusader States and on Venetian Expansion (1989).
- Social Evolution in Latin Greece (1989). In the Wisconsin Collaborative History of the Crusades, Volume VI. The Impact of the Crusades on Europe.

Edgar N. Johnson. Edgar Nathaniel Johnson (1901–1969), an American historian.

- An Introduction to Medieval Europe, 300-1500 (1937). With James Westfall Thompson.
- The Crusades of Frederick Barbarossa and Henry VI (1969). An account of the actions of Frederick Barbarossa in the Third Crusade and the follow-on Crusade of 1197 conducted by his son Henry VI of Germany. In the Wisconsin Collaborative History of the Crusades, Volume II, The Later Crusades 1187–1311.
- The German Crusade on the Baltic (1975). In the Wisconsin Collaborative History of the Crusades, Volume III. The Fourteenth and Fifteenth Centuries.

Howard Kaminsky. Howard Kaminsky (born 1924), a British historian.

- A History of the Hussite Revolution (1967). A history of the Hussites and their conflicts with the Catholic Church, particularly the Hussite Wars that include the anti-Hussite crusades.

Benjamin Z. Kedar. Benjamin Zeev Kedar (born 1938) is an Israeli historian of the Crusades and the Latin East. (Benjamin Kedar CV)

- The Crusaders in their Kingdom, 1099–1291 (1987).
- The Franks in the Levant, 11th to 14th Centuries (1993)
- The Jerusalem Massacre of July 1099 (2004). In the Western Historiography of the Crusades (2004).

Hugh N. Kennedy. Hugh N. Kennedy (born 1947), a British medieval historian specializing in the early Islamic Middle East and the Crusades.

- The Prophet and the Age of the Caliphates, 600–1050 (1986).
- Crusader Castles (1994). An account of the history and architecture of Crusader castles in the Kingdom of Jerusalem, County of Tripoli and Principality of Antioch between 1099 and 1291.
- The Historiography of Islamic Egypt, c. 950–1800 (2000).
- Castles: Outremer (2006). In The Crusades - An Encyclopedia.

Hilmar Carl Krueger. Hilmar Carl Krueger, an American historian specializing in medieval Italy.

- The Italian Cities and the Arabs before 1093 (1969). In the Wisconsin Collaborative History of the Crusades, Volume I. The First One Hundred Years.

Angeliki E. Laiou. Angeliki E. Laiou (1941–2008), a Greek-American Byzantinist.

- The Crusades from the Perspective of Byzantium and the Muslim World (2001). Edited by A. Laiou and Roy Mottahedeh.

Ann Lambton. Ann Katharine Swynford Lambton (1912–2008), a British historian and expert on medieval and early modern Persian history.

- Continuity and Change in Medieval Persia (1988).
- The Cambridge History of Islam (1992). Edited by A. Lambton.

Bernard Lewis. Bernard Lewis (1916–2018), a British-American historian specialized in Oriental studies, particularly the Assassins.

- The Sources for the History of the Syrian Assassins, in Speculum, XXVII (1952).
- The Assassins: a Radical Sect in Islam (1967).
- The IIsmāʻīlites and the Assassins (1969). In the Wisconsin Collaborative History of the Crusades, Volume 1.
- Islam: From the Prophet Muhammad to the Capture of Constantinople (1974).
- The Origins of Ismāʻīlism: A Study of the Historical Background of the Fātimid Caliphate (2001).

Simon Lloyd. Simon Lloyd, a British historian.

- English Society and the Crusade, 1216-1307 (1988).
- The Crusading Movement, 1096–1274 (1995). In The Oxford History of the Crusades.

Peter Lock. Peter Lock, a British historian.

- The Franks in the Aegean, 1204-1500 (1995).
- The Routledge Companion to the Crusades (2006). A comprehensive discussion of all the Crusades, major players and historians. With complete bibliography.
- Chronicle of the Morea (2006). A discussion of the 14th century work Chronicle of the Morea. In The Crusades - An Encyclopedia.

Jean Longnon. Jean Longnon (1887–1979), a French bibliothécaire, historian and journalist. (cf. French Wikipedia, Jean Longnon)

- Livre de la conqueste de la princée de l'Amorée: Chronique de Morée (1204-1305) (1911). An edition of the Chronicle of the Morea, a 14th-century history covering the establishment of Crusader states in Greece, including a discussion of the civil organization of the Principality of Achaea.
- The Frankish States in Greece, 1204–1311 (1969). In the Wisconsin Collaborative History of the Crusades, Volume II, The Later Crusades 1187–1311.
- Les Compagnons de Villehardouin: Recherches sur les croisés de la quatrième croisade (1978). A study of Geoffrey de Villehardouin and the Fourth Crusade.

Harry Luke. Sir Harry Charles Luke (1884–1969), an official in the British Colonial Office, serving in Cyprus and Palestine among others, and was the author of books on several of these countries.

- The Handbook of Cyprus (1913).
- Cyprus under the Turks, 1571–1878 (1921).
- The Handbook of Palestine (1922).
- The Kingdom of Cyprus, 1291–1369 (1975). In the Wisconsin Collaborative History of the Crusades, Volume III. The Fourteenth and Fifteenth Centuries.
- The Kingdom of Cyprus, 1369–1489 (1975). In the Wisconsin Collaborative History of the Crusades, Volume III. The Fourteenth and Fifteenth Centuries.

Anthony T. Luttrell. Anthony Thorton Luttrell, a British historian specializing in the military orders.

- The Hospitallers at Rhodes, 1306–1421 (1975). In the Wisconsin Collaborative History of the Crusades, Volume III. The Fourteenth and Fifteenth Centuries.
- The Military Orders, 1312–1798 (1995). In the Oxford History of the Crusades.
- Works by Anthony T. Luttrell.

Francis Lützow. Francis Lützow (1849–1916), a Bohemian historian.

- Lectures on the Historians of Bohemia (1905).
- The Life and Times of Master John Hus (1909). A biography of pre-Protestant Christian reformer Jan Hus, executed by the Catholic Church in 1415 for heresy, bringing about the Hussite Wars.
- The Hussite Wars (1914). An account of the Hussite Wars of the 15th century, in particular the Anti-Hussite Crusades.

Thomas F. Madden. Thomas F. Madden (born 1960), an American historian of the Crusades. (cf. Thomas Madden CV)

- The New Concise History of the Crusades (2005). (Lanham: Rowman and Littlefield, 2005; repr New York: Barnes and Noble, 2007).
- The Real History of the Crusades (2011). For the Association for Renaissance Martial Arts (ARMA).

Archibald Main. Archibald Main (1876–1947), a Scottish ecclesiastical historian.

- The Emperor Sigismund: the Stanhope essay (1903). A biography of 15th century Holy Roman Emperor Sigismund.

Hans E. Mayer. Hans Eberhard Mayer (born 1932), a German historian.

- Bibliographie zur Geschichte der Kreuzzüge (1960). A comprehensive bibliography of the Crusades.
- Studies in the History of Queen Melisende of Jerusalem (1972).
- Ibelin versus Ibelin: The Struggle for the Regency of Jerusalem 1253-1258 (1978).
- America and the Crusades. Proceedings of the American Philosophical Society, 125, No. 1 (1981)
- The Succession to Baldwin II of Jerusalem: English Impact on the East (1985).
- Angevins versus Normans: The New Men of King Fulk of Jerusalem (1989).
- Select Bibliography on the Crusades (1989). Compiled by H. Mayer and Joyce McLellan. Edited by Harry W. Hazard.

Edgar H. McNeal. Edgar Holmes McNeal (1874-1955), an American historian specializing on medieval Europe and the Crusades.

- A Source Book for Mediæval History (1905). Selected documents illustrating the history of Europe in the Middle Age.
- The Conquest of Constantinople (1936).
- The Fourth Crusade (1977). With Robert L. Wolff. In the Wisconsin Collaborative History of the Crusades, Volume II, The Later Crusades 1187–1311.

David Michael Metcalf. David Michael Metcalf (1933–2018), a British numismatist.

- Coinage of the Crusades and the Latin East in the Ashmolean Museum Oxford (1995). A collection of Crusade-era coins at the Ashmolean Museum, Britain's first public museum. Published by the Society for the Study of the Crusades and the Latin East, Royal Numismatic Society.

Laura Minervini. Laura Minervini, an Italian historian who is expert on the Gestes des Chiprois.

- Les Gestes des Chiprois et la tradition historiographique de l'Orient latin (2004).
- Literature of Outremer and Cyprus (2006). In The Crusades - An Encyclopedia.
- Gestes des Chiprois (2006). Ibid.
- Philip of Novara (2006). Ibid.

John L. La Monte. John L. La Monte (1902–1949), an American historian.

- Feudal Monarchy in the Latin Kingdom of Jerusalem, 1100–1291 (1932).
- The Wars of Frederick II against the Ibelins in Syria and Cyprus by Philip de Novare (1936).
- A syllabus and reading list to accompany Carl Stephenson's Mediæval History (1936). Companion to Mediæval History: Europe from the Fourth to the Sixteenth Century (1935) by American historian Carl Stephenson (1886–1954).
- Review of "The Rule, Statutes and Customs of the Hospitallers 1099-1310," by E. J. King. Speculum, 10(3), 347–349.
- The Noble Houses of Outremer (1937). Genealogical and biographical studies of the Crusading States.
- John of Ibelin. The Old Lord of Beirut, 1177-1236 (1937).
- Some Problems in Crusading Historiography (1940). In Speculum, Volume 15 (1940), pp. 57–75.

Roy Parviz Mottahedeh. Roy Parviz Mottahedeh, an American historian.

- The Crusades from the Perspective of Byzantium and the Muslim World (2001). Edited by R. Mottahedeh and Angeliki Laiou.

Alan V. Murray. Alan V. Murray, a Scottiish historian specializing on the Crusades.

- From Clermont to Jerusalem: The Crusades and Crusader Societies, 1095-1500 (1998). Edited by A. Murray.
- The Crusader Kingdom of Jerusalem: A Dynastic History, 1099-1125 (2000).
- Crusade and Conversion on the Baltic Frontier, 1150-1500 (2001). Edited by A. Murray.
- The Crusades—An Encyclopedia (2006). Edited by A. Murray. A comprehensive treatment of the Crusades.

Sirarpie Der Nersessian. Sirarpie Der Nersessian (1896–1989), an Armenian art historian specializing in Armenian and Byzantine studies.

- Armenia and the Byzantine Empire (1945).
- The Kingdom of Cilician Armenia (1969). In the Wisconsin Collaborative History of the Crusades, Volume II, The Later Crusades 1187–1311.

Helen J. Nicholson. Helen Jane Nicholson, a British historian of the Crusades and the Military Religious Orders.

- Chronicle of the Third Crusade: a translation of the Itinerarium peregrinorum et gesta regis Ricardi (1997).
- The Crusades (2004).
- Palgrave Advances in the Crusades (2005). Edited by Helen J. Nicholson.
- Itnerarium Peregrinarum et Gesta Regis Ricardi (2016). An account of the anonymous Itinerarium Regis Ricardi (Itnerarium Peregrinarum et Gesta Regis Ricardi) compiled by Richard de Templo and once attributed to medieval grammarian Geoffrey of Vinsauf (fl. 1200). In Encyclopedia of Medieval Chronicle.
- Bibliography of works by Helen Nicholson.

Robert L. Nicholson. Robert Lawrence Nicholson (1908-1985), an American historian of the Crusades.

- Tancred: a study of his career and work in their relation to the first Crusade and the establishment of the Latin states in Syria and Palestine (1940). A biography of Tancred, Prince of Galilee (1075–1112).
- Joscelyn I, Prince of Edessa (1954). A biography of Joscelyn I of Edessa.
- The Growth of the Latin States, 1118–1144 (1969). In the Wisconsin Collaborative History of the Crusades, Volume I. The First One Hundred Years.
- Joscelyn III and the Fall of the Crusader States, 1134-1199 (1973). A biography of Joscelyn III, Count of Edessa.

David C. Nicolle. David Charles Nicolle (born 1944) is a British historian specializing in the military history of the Middle East.

- Crusader Castles in the Holy Land, 1192–1302 (2004). Examines the early fortifications erected by the Crusaders in Israel, the Palestinian territories, Jordan, Lebanon, Syria and Turkey.

George Ostrogorsky. George Ostrogorsky (1902–1976), a Russian-born Yugoslavian historian specializing in the Byzantine Empire.

- History of the Byzantine State (1969). A comprehensive thousand-year history of the Byzantine Empire.

Sidney Painter. Sidney Painter (1902–1960), an American medievalist and historian.

- Western Europe on the Eve of the Crusades (1969). In the Wisconsin Collaborative History of the Crusades, Volume I. The First One Hundred Years.
- The Third Crusade: Richard the Llionhearted and Philip Augustus (1969). In the Wisconsin Collaborative History of the Crusades, Volume II, The Later Crusades 1187–1311.
- The Crusade of Theobald of Champagne and Richard of Cornwall, 1239–1241 (1969). An account of the Barons' Crusade. In the Wisconsin Collaborative History of the Crusades, Volume II, The Later Crusades 1187–1311.

Jonathan P. Phillips. Jonathan P. Phillips (born 1965), a British historian and medievalist.

- The Experience of Crusading (2003).
- The Fourth Crusade and the Sack of Constantinople (2004)
- The Second Crusade: Extending the Frontiers of Christendom (2010).
- The Crusades 1095-1197 (2014).
- Perceptions of the Crusades from the Nineteenth to the Twenty-First Century (2018). An exploration of the ways in which the Crusades have been used in the last two centuries, including the varying uses of Crusading rhetoric and imagery.
- The Life and Legend of the Sultan Saladin (2019).

James M. Powell. James M. Powell (1930–2011), an American historian.

- Anatomy of a Crusade, 1213-1221 (1986).
- The Crusades: An Introduction (2006). In The Crusades—An Encyclopedia, edited by Alan V. Murray.
- The Crusades, the Kingdom of Sicily, and the Mediterranean (2007).

Joshua Prawer. Joshua Prawer (1917–1990), an Israeli historian.

- Histoire du royaume Latin de Jérusalem (1969).
- The Latin Kingdom of Jerusalem: European Colonialism in the Middle Ages (1972).
- The World of the Crusaders (1972).
- Crusader Institutions (1980)
- Social Classes in the Crusader States: the "Minorities" (1985). In the Wisconsin Collaborative History of the Crusades, Volume V, The Impact of the Crusades on the Near East.
- Social Classes in the Latin Kingdom: the Franks (1985). In the Wisconsin Collaborative History of the Crusades, Volume V, The Impact of the Crusades on the Near East.
- The History of the Jews in the Latin Kingdom of Jerusalem (1988)
- The History of Jerusalem: The Early Muslim Period (638-1099) (1996).

Jean Richard. Jean Barthélémy Richard (1921–2021), a French historian and medievalist.

- The Political and Ecclesiastical Organization of the Crusader States (1985). In the Wisconsin Collaborative History of the Crusades, Volume V, The Impact of the Crusades on the Near East.
- Agricultural Conditions in the Crusader States (1985). In the Wisconsin Collaborative History of the Crusades, Volume V, The Impact of the Crusades on the Near East.
- The Institutions of the Kingdom of Cyprus (1989). In the Wisconsin Collaborative History of the Crusades, Volume VI. The Impact of the Crusades on Europe.
- The Crusades: c. 1071 - c. 1291 (1999).

Jonathan Riley-Smith. Jonathan Riley-Smith (1938–2016), a British historian of the Crusades. (cf. Jonathan Riley-Smith CV)

- The First Crusade and the Idea of Crusading (1993).
- The Oxford History of the Crusades (1995). Edited by J. Riley-Smith.
- The First Crusaders, 1095-1131 (1997)
- The works of Jonathan Riley-Smith in HathiTrust.

Louise Buenger Robbert. Louise Buenger Robbert, an American historian and numismatist, with an emphasis on medieval Venice.

- The Venetian money market, 1150-1229 (1971).
- Reorganization of the Venetian coinage by Doge Enrico Dandolo (1974).
- Venice and the Crusades (1985). In the Wisconsin Collaborative History of the Crusades, Volume V, The Impact of the Crusades on the Near East.

Ettore Rossi. Ettore Rossi (1894-1955), an Italian historian.

- The Hospitallers at Rhodes, 1421–1523 (1975). In the Wisconsin Collaborative History of the Crusades, Volume III. The Fourteenth and Fifteenth Centuries.

Jay Rubenstein. Jay Rubenstein (born 1967), an American historian of the Middle Ages.

- Guibert of Nogent: Portrait of a Medieval Mind (2002).
- What is the Gesta Francorum, and who was Peter Tudebode? (2005).

Steven Runciman. Steven Runciman (1903–2000), a British historian of the Middle Ages, specializing in the Crusades and the Byzantine empire. (cf. French Wikipedia, Steven Runciman)

- The First Crusaders' Journey across the Balkan Peninsula (1949). In Byzantion, Volume XXIX, pp. 207–221.
- A History of the Crusades, Volume One: The First Crusade and the Foundation of the Kingdom of Jerusalem (1951).
- A History of the Crusades, Volume Two: The Kingdom of Jerusalem and the Frankish East, 1100-1187 (1952).
- A History of the Crusades, Volume Three: The Kingdom of Acre and the Later Crusades (1954).
- The Sicilian Vespers: A History of the Mediterranean World in the Later Thirteenth Century (1958).
- Byzantine Civilisation (1959).
- The Families of Outremer: the Feudal Nobility of the Crusader Kingdom of Jerusalem, 1099-1291 (1960).
- The Pilgrimages to Palestine before 1093 (1969). In the Wisconsin Collaborative History of the Crusades, Volume I. The First One Hundred Years.
- The First Crusade, Constantinople to Antioch (1969). In the Wisconsin Collaborative History of the Crusades, Volume I. The First One Hundred Years.
- The First Crusade, Antioch to Ascalon (1969). In the Wisconsin Collaborative History of the Crusades, Volume I. The First One Hundred Years.
- The Crusader States, 1243–1291 (1969). In the Wisconsin Collaborative History of the Crusades, Volume II, The Later Crusades 1187–1311.

Josiah Cox Russell. Josiah Cox Russell, an American historian.

- The Population of the Crusader States (1985). In the Wisconsin Collaborative History of the Crusades, Volume V, The Impact of the Crusades on the Near East.

Henry L. Savage. Henry Lyttleton Savage (1892–1979), an American Arthurian scholar.

- The Gawain-poet; studies in his personality and background (1956). A study of the author of Sir Gawain and the Green Knight.
- Pilgrimages and Pilgrim Shrines in Palestine and Syria after 1095 (1979). In the Wisconsin Collaborative History of the Crusades, Volume IV. The Art and Architecture of the Crusader States.

Kenneth Meyer Setton. Kenneth Meyer Setton (1914–1995), an American historian and an expert on the history of medieval Europe and the Crusades.

- Catalan Domination of Athens, 1311–1388 (1948). A history of the founding of the Catalan Company and their subsequent control of the Duchy of Athens and Thebes.
- The Age of Chivalry (1969).
- Wisconsin Collaborative History of the Crusades, 6 volumes (1969-1989). General editorship.
- The Catalans in Greece, 1311–1380 (1975). In the Wisconsin Collaborative History of the Crusades, Volume III. The Fourteenth and Fifteenth Centuries.
- The Catalans and Florentines in Greece, 1380–1462 (1975). In the Wisconsin Collaborative History of the Crusades, Volume III. The Fourteenth and Fifteenth Centuries.
- The Papacy and the Levant, 1204–1571, 4 volumes (1976).
- The Ottoman Turks and the Crusades, 1451–1522 (1989). In the Wisconsin Collaborative History of the Crusades, Volume VI. The Impact of the Crusades on Europe.

Moshe Sharon. Moshe Sharon (born 1937), an Israeli historian of Islam. Referred to as "Israel's greatest Middle East scholar."

- Corpus Inscriptionum Arabicarum Palaestinae, 6 volumes to date; 7th projected (1997–2021). An extensive work that provides the epigraphy of the Holy Land relating to construction, dedication, religious endowments, epitaphs, Quranic texts, prayers and invocations. His work has been instrumental in the continued analysis of original texts of the Crusades. Current volumes cover A through J, Part 1. Seventh volume partially covers Jerusalem.

J. Elizabeth Siberry. J. Elizabeth Siberry, a British historian.

- Tasso and the Crusades: history of a legacy (1993). An essay on Italian poet Torquato Tasso (1544–1595) and his influential work La Gerusalemme liberata (Jerusalem Delivered) (1581).
- Images of the Crusades in the Nineteenth and Twentieth Centuries (1995). In the Oxford History of the Crusades.
- The New Crusaders: Images of the Crusades in the Nineteenth and Twentieth Centuries (2000).

Denis Sinor. Denis Sinor (1916–2011), a Hungarian scholar of the history of Central Asia.

- The Mongols and Western Europe (1975). In the Wisconsin Collaborative History of the Crusades, Volume III. The Fourteenth and Fifteenth Centuries.
- The Cambridge History of Early Inner Asia (1990). Edited by D. Sinor. Contributions include Introduction: the Concept of Inner Asia; the Hun Period; and the Establishment and Dissolution of the Türk Empire.

Raymond C. Smail. Raymond Charles Smail (1913-1986), a British historian and medievalist.

- Crusading Warfare (1097–1193) (1956).
- The Crusaders in Syria and the Holy Land. (1973).

Indrikis Sterns. Indrikis Sterns (1928–2005), a Latvian-American medieval historian.

- The Teutonic Knights in the Crusader States (1985). In the Wisconsin Collaborative History of the Crusades, Volume V, The Impact of the Crusades on the Near East.

William Barron Stevenson. William Barron Stevenson (1869-1954), a British historian.

- The Crusaders in the East (1907). A history of the Crusades from the Muslim viewpoint.

Joseph R. Strayer. Joseph Reese Strayer (1904–1987) was an American medievalist, also serving as a member of the CIA's Office of National Estimates.

- Western Europe in the Middle Ages: a short history (1955).
- The Political Crusades of the Thirteenth Century (1969). In the Wisconsin Collaborative History of the Crusades, Volume II, The Later Crusades 1187–1311.
- The Crusades of Louis IX (1969). In the Wisconsin Collaborative History of the Crusades, Volume II, The Later Crusades 1187–1311.
- The Albigensian Crusades (1971). With a new epilog by Carol Lansing in the 1992 edition.

Heinrich von Sybel. Heinrich von Sybel (1817–1895), a German historian.

- History and Literature of the Crusades (1861). Translated by Lucie, Lady Duff-Gordon.

Taef El-Azhari. Taef El-Azhari, an Egyptian historian specializing in the history of the Seljuk and Zengid dynasties.

- The Saljūqs of Syria: during the Crusades, 463-549 A.H./1070-1154 A.D (1997).
- Zengi and the Muslim response to the Crusades: The politics of jihad (2016).

James Westfall Thompson. James Westfall Thompson (1869–1941), an American historian specializing in the history of medieval and early modern Europe, particularly of the Holy Roman Empire and France.

- Economic and social history of the Middle Ages (300–1300), 2 volumes (1928).
- The Middle Ages, 300–1500, 2 volumes (1931).
- An Introduction to Medieval Europe, 300-1500 (1937). With Edgar N. Johnson.
- Medieval and historiographical essays: in honor of James Westfall Thompson (1938). Edited by James Lea Cate and Eugene N. Anderson.

Robert W. Thomson. Robert William Thomson (1934–2018), a British-Armenian historian.

- The Crusaders through Armenian Eyes (2001). In The Crusades from the Perspective of Byzantium and the Muslim World (2001).

Peter Topping. Peter Topping, a British historian.

- The Morea, 1311–1364 (1975). In the Wisconsin Collaborative History of the Crusades, Volume III. The Fourteenth and Fifteenth Centuries.
- The Morea, 1364–1460 (1975). Ibid.

Barbara W. Tuchman. Barbara Wertheim Tuchman (1912–1989), an American historian.

- A Distant Mirror: The Calamitous Fourteenth Century (1978).

Christopher Tyerman. Christopher Tyerman (born 1953), a British historian focusing on the Crusades.

- The Crusades: A Very Short Introduction (2005).
- God's War: A New History of the Crusades (2006). The dust jacket announces God's War as "the definitive account of a fascinating and horrifying story" and compares it to Runciman's "well-loved and much-published classic study of the Crusades."
- The Crusades (A Brief Insight) (2009).
- The Invention of the Crusades (1998).
- Modern Historiography (2006). In The Crusades: An Encyclopedia, edited by Alan V. Murray. A critical analysis of Crusader histories from the fifteenth century to the early twenty-first century.
- The Debate on the Crusades, 1099–2010 (2011). A study of how historians from the eleventh century to the present have developed accounts of the Crusades to suit changing contemporary circumstances and interests. Assessment of works by leading scholars from John Foxe, Gottfried Leibniz, Voltaire and Dave Hume, to historians such as William Robertson, Edward Gibbon and Leopold Ranke. Related the study of the Crusades to academic trends and controversies over the last hundred years, including twentieth-century works by Crusader scholars such as Carl Erdmann and Steven Runciman. In Issues in Historiography (2011)
- Bibliography of works by Christopher Tyerman.

Thomas C. Van Cleve. Thomas Curtis Van Cleve (1888–1976), and American historian of the Middle Ages.

- A Study of the Sources of the De Sphaera Mundi of Joannes de Sacrobosco or John Holywood (1921). A study of the astronomy work De sphaera mundi (The Sphere of the Cosmos or Tractatus de sphaera) by the medieval scholar Johannes de Sacrobosco (c. 1195 – c. 1256).
- Markward of Anweiler and the Sicilian Regency: a study of Hohenstaufen policy in Sicily during the minority of Frederick II (1937). A biography of Markward von Annweiler (died 1202), imperial seneschal and regent of the Kingdom of Sicily, who was the target of one of the early political crusades.
- The Fifth Crusade (1969). In the Wisconsin Collaborative History of the Crusades, Volume II, The Later Crusades 1187–1311.
- The Crusade of Frederick II (1969). In the Wisconsin Collaborative History of the Crusades, Volume II, The Later Crusades 1187–1311.

Helene Wieruszowski. Helene Wieruszowski, an American scholar of medieval history.

- The Norman Kingdom of Sicily and the Crusades (1969). In the Wisconsin Collaborative History of the Crusades, Volume II, The Later Crusades 1187–1311.

Robert L. Wolff. Robert L. Wolff (1915–1980), an American historian.

- Wisconsin Collaborative History of the Crusades, Volume II. The Later Crusades, 1189–1311 (1969). Edited by R. Wolff (1915-1980) and Harry W. Hazard.
- The Fourth Crusade (1969). With Edgar H. McNeal. In the Wisconsin Collaborative History of the Crusades, Volume II, The Later Crusades 1187–1311.
- The Latin Empire of Constantinople, 1224–1311 (1969). In the Wisconsin Collaborative History of the Crusades, Volume II, The Later Crusades 1187–1311.
- Studies in the Latin Empire of Constantinople (1976).

Norman P. Zacour. Norman P. Zacour, an American historian of the Crusades.

- The Children's Crusade (1969). In the Wisconsin Collaborative History of the Crusades, Volume II. The Later Crusades 1187–1311.
- Wisconsin Collaborative History of the Crusades, Volume V. The Impact of the Crusades on the Near East (1985). Edited by N. Zacour and Harry W. Hazard.
- Wisconsin Collaborative History of the Crusades, Volume VI. The Impact of the Crusades on Europe (1989). Edited by N. Zacour and Harry W. Hazard.

Muḥammad Muṣṭafā Ziyādaẗ. Muḥammad Muṣṭafā Ziyādaẗ (died 1968), an Egyptian medieval historian.

- The Mamluk Sultans to 1293 (1969). In the Wisconsin Collaborative History of the Crusades, Volume II. The Later Crusades 1187–1311.
- The Mamluk Sultans, 1291–1517 (1975). In the Wisconsin Collaborative History of the Crusades, Volume III. The Fourteenth and Fifteenth Centuries.

== Bibliography for the historiography of the Crusades ==
The historiography of the Crusades (literally, the history of histories) includes the original sources and subsequent histories, as well as the study of how historians have interpreted the Crusades. This is a complex subject that several contemporary historians have provided their perspective. Prominent ones are discussed below. These include Tyerman's Modern Historiography and Constable's Historiography of the Crusades.

Overview. Alan V. Murray's The Crusades—An Encyclopedia includes a series of articles on the historiography of the Crusades, including the following.

- Modern Historiography, by Christopher Tyerman.
- Western Sources, by Susan Edgington and Alan V. Murray.
- Greek Sources, by Jonathan Harris.
- Arabic Sources, by Niall Christie.
- Armenian Sources, by Angus Stewart.
- Syriac Sources, by Dorothea Weltecke.
- Hebrew Sources, by Anna Sapir Abulafia.

Louis R. Bréhier. Louis R. Bréhier (1869–1951), a French historian specializing in Byzantine studies.

- Crusades (Bibliography and Sources) (1908). A concise summary of the historiography of the Crusades. In the Catholic Encyclopedia.

Ernest Barker. Ernest Barker (1874–1960), an English political scientist.

- Crusades (1911). A summary of the history of the Crusades. Section 11. Literature of Crusades provides a view of the historiography of the Crusades. In the 11th edition of the Encyclopædia Britannica.
- The Crusades (1923). A later edition of the Encyclopædia Britannica article, edited with additional notes.

Carole Hillenbrand. Carole Hillenbrand (born 1943), a British Islamic scholar.

- A Muslim Principality in Crusader Times: the Early Artuqid state (1990). Based on her PhD thesis History of the Jazira, 1100–1150.
- The Crusades: Islamic Perspectives (2000). Discusses themes that highlight how Muslims reacted to the presence of the Crusaders in the heart of traditionally Islamic territory. Examines ideological concerns and the importance of the jihad in the context of the gradual recovery of the Holy Land and the expulsion of the Crusaders.

Konrad Hirschler. Konrad Hirschler, a German historian specializing on medieval Islam.

- Medieval Arabic Historiography: Authors as Actors (2006).
- The Jerusalem Conquest of 492/1099 in the Medieval Arabic Historiography of the Crusades: From Regional Plurality to Islamic Narrative (2013). A comparative study of how Arabic historians treated the conquest of Jerusalem, with estimates of victims ranging from 70,000 to 100,0000. Historians considered include ibn al-Qalanisi (1071–1160), Ali ibn al-Athir (1160–1233), al-Azimi (1090 – after 1161), ibn al-Azraq al-Fariqi (1116–1176), Bar Hebraeus (1226–1286), Imad ad-Din al-Isfahani (1125–1201), al-Jazari (fl. 1290–1299), Kamal al-Din (1192–1262), Sibt ibn al-Jawzi (1185–1256), ibn Khallikan (1211–1282), Abu’l-Fida (Abu'l-Feda) (1273–1331), Al-Makrizi (1364–1442) and Diya al-Din al-Maqdisi.(1173–1245).
- Studying Mamluk Historiography. From Source-Criticism to the Cultural Turn (2013)
- Ibn Wāṣil: An Ayyūbid Perspective on Frankish Lordships and Crusades (2015). A study on the works of Syrian historian Ibn Wāṣil (1208–1298).

Ibn Khaldūn. 'Abd al-Raḥmār ibn Khaldūn (before 1337 – 1406), an Arab scholar of Islam, social scientist and historian, who has been described as the father of the modern discipline of historiography.

- Kitāb al-ʻIbar, 7 volumes (1337), Book of Lessons, Record of Beginnings and Events in the History of the Arabs and the Berbers and Their Powerful Contemporaries. Includes three parts: al-Muqaddimah (Prolegomena), a universal history of empires; A world history of events up to 1337; and Historiography of works from Arabic Africa.

Bernard Lewis. Bernard Lewis (1916–2018), a British-American historian specialized in Oriental studies, particularly the Assassins.

- The Sources for the History of the Syrian Assassins, in Speculum, XXVII (1952).

Jonathan Riley-Smith. Jonathan Riley-Smith (1938–2016), a British historian of the Crusades.

- The Crusading Movement and Historians (1995). A discussion of the evolving view of historians to the Crusades. In The Oxford History of the Crusades.

Christopher Tyerman. Christopher Tyerman (born 1953), a British historian focusing on the Crusades.

- Modern Historiography (2006). In The Crusades: An Encyclopedia. A critical analysis of Crusader histories from the fifteenth century to the early twenty-first century.
- The Invention of the Crusades (1998). Particularly, Proteus Unbound: Crusading Historiography. A historical study of the Crusades from the original sources of the First Crusade through the nineteenth century.
- The Debate on the Crusades, 1099–2010 (2011). A study of how historians from the eleventh century to the present have developed accounts of the Crusades to suit changing contemporary circumstances and interests. Assessment of works by leading scholars from John Foxe, Gottfried Leibniz, Voltaire and Dave Hume, to historians such as William Robertson, Edward Gibbon and Leopold Ranke. Related the study of the Crusades to academic trends and controversies over the last hundred years, including twentieth-century works by Crusader scholars such as Carl Erdmann and Steven Runciman. In Issues in Historiography (2011).

Mikhail Abramovich Zaborov. Mikhail Abramovich Zaborov (20th century), a Russian historian of the Crusades.

- Introduction to the Historiography of the Crusades (1966), in Russian.
- Historiography of the Crusades [15th–19th century] (1971), in Russian.

Further works on the historiography of the Crusades, Western view. Additional works presenting the Western viewpoint of the topic of historiography, some previously cited, include the following.

- History and Literature of the Crusades (1861), by Heinrich von Sybel (1817–1895), translated by Lucie, Lady Duff-Gordon. Particularly, Part II: Literature of the Crusades.
- Recent Developments in Crusading Historiography (1937), by T. S. R. Boase (1898–1974). In History, Volume 22.
- Some Problems in Crusading Historiography (1940), by John L. La Monte (1902–1949). In Speculum, Volume 15 (1940), pp. 57–75.
- The Origin of the Idea of Crusade (1977), by Carl Erdmann (1898–1945). Translation by Marshall W. Baldwin (1903–1975) and Walter Goffart (born 1934).
- The Historiography of the Crusades (2001), by Giles Constable (1929–2021). In The Crusades from the Perspective of Byzantium and the Muslim World .
- Introduction to the Historiography of the Crusades (1966) and Historiography of the Crusades [15th–19th century] (1971), both in Russian. By Mikhail Abramovich Zaborov,
- The Crusades: A Documentary Survey (1962) and The Crusades, Motives and Achievements (1964), by James A. Brundage.
- Recent Crusade Historiography: Some Observations and Suggestions (1964) by James A. Brundage. In Catholic Historical Review (CHR) 49.
- The New Crusaders: Images of the Crusades in the Nineteenth and Twentieth Centuries (2000). By British historian J. Elizabeth Siberry.
- The Historiography of Islamic Egypt, c. 950-1800 (2000). By British historian Hugh N. Kennedy.
- Les Gestes des Chiprois et la tradition historiographique de l'Orient latin (2004). By Laura Minervini.
- Perceptions of the Crusades from the Nineteenth to the Twenty-first Century (2018). Edited by Jonathan P. Phillips. An exploration of the ways in which the Crusades have been used in the last two centuries, including the varying uses of Crusading rhetoric and imagery.
- Medieval and historiographical essays: in honor of James Westfall Thompson (1938). Edited by James Lea Cate and Eugene N. Anderson.
- The Literature and Historiography of the Baltic Crusade (2001). Edited by Alan V. Murray. In Crusade and Conversion on the Baltic Frontier, 1150–1500.
- Crusaders and Historians (2005), by Thomas F. Madden.
- The Jerusalem Massacre of July 1099 in the Western Historiography of the Crusades (2004), by Benjamin Z. Kedar.

Byzantine, Islamic, Jewish and Armenian views on the Crusades. Works that present the historiography of the Crusades from Byzantine, Islamic, Jewish or Armenian viewpoints included the following.

- The Crusades from the Perspective of Byzantium and the Muslim World (2001). Edited by Greek-American Byzantinist Angeliki E. Laiou (1941–2008) and American historian Roy Parviz Mottahedeh.
- Arabic Historiography of the Crusades (1962) and Arab Historians of the Crusades (1969), by Italian Arabist and orientalist Francesco Gabrieli (1904–1996).
- The Crusade: Historiography and Bibliography (1962), by Egyptian Coptologist Aziz Suryal Atiya (1898–1988).
- The Crusaders in the East (1907), by William Barron Stevenson (1869-1954). A history of the Crusades from the Muslim viewpoint.
- History of the Jews, 6 volumes (1853–1875), by Heinrich Graetz (1817–1891). The Crusades from a Jewish viewpoint are covered in Volume 3.
- The Crusades: Islamic Perspectives (2000), by British Islamic scholar Carole Hillenbrand.
- Historiography of the Seljuqid period (1962), by French orientalist Claude Cahen.
- The History of Jerusalem: The Early Muslim Period (638–1099) (1996). By Israeli historian Joshua Prawer (1917–1990).
- The Crusaders through Armenian Eyes (2001), by British Armenian historian Robert William Thomson (1934–2018). In The Crusades from the Perspective of Byzantium and the Muslim World (2001).
- Islamic historiography (2016). By Heidi R. Krauss-Sánchez and Paulina López Pita. In the Encyclopedia of the Medieval Chronicle.

== See also ==
- Bibliography of the Crusades: modern works
