= Bibliography of the Crusades: modern works =

This list of works on the history of the Crusades and their mainly Muslim opponents provides a select bibliography of modern works that are frequently cited in books, papers and articles that discuss these "holy wars". Thousands of histories on these topics have been published between the 11th and 21st centuries; this page only lists modern works on the topic. Works included are referenced in the notes or bibliographies of scholarly secondary sources or journals. Included works are: published by an independent academic or notable non-governmental publisher; authored by an independent and notable subject matter expert; or have significant independent scholarly journal reviews.

== General works ==
- Asbridge, Thomas (2012). The Crusades: The War for the Holy Land. Simon & Schuster. ISBN 9781849836883.
- Flori, Jean (1999). Les croisades: Origines, réalisations, institutions, déviations. Gisserot. ISBN 9782877475426.
- Grousset, René (1970). The Epic of the Crusades [L'épopée des croisades]. Translated by Lindsay, Noël. Orion Press. ISBN 9780023297229.
- Hamilton, Bernard (1998). The Crusades. Sutton. ISBN 9780750919142.
- Lock, Peter (2006). The Routledge Companion to the Crusades. Routledge. ISBN 9781135131371.
- Madden, Thomas F. (2013). The Concise History of the Crusades. Critical Issues in World and International History (Third ed.). Rowman & Littlefield. ISBN 978-1-4422-1575-7.
- Mayer, Hans E. (1972). The Crusades [Geschichte der Kreuzzg̈e]. Translated by Gillingham, John. Oxford University Press. ISBN 9780198730972.
- Michaud, Joseph François (1881). History of the Crusades [Histoire des Croisades]. Translated by Robson, William. Three volumes. London: George Routledge and Sons.
- Phillips, Charles (2010). The Complete Illustrated History of the Crusades. Hermes House. ISBN 9780857231352.
- Richard, Jean C. (1999). The Crusades, c.1071–c.1291 [Histoire des croisades]. Translated by Birrell, Jean. Cambridge University Press. ISBN 9780521625661.
- Riley-Smith, Jonathan, ed. (2001). The Oxford Illustrated History of The Crusades. Oxford University Press. ISBN 9780192854285.
- Riley-Smith, Jonathan (2014). The Crusades: A History. Bloomsbury Publishing. ISBN 9781472508799.
- Rousset, Paul (1957). Histoire des croisades. Payot. ISBN 9782228120203.
- Runciman, Steven (1951). A History of the Crusades, Volume One: The First Crusade and the Foundation of the Kingdom of Jerusalem. Cambridge University Press. ISBN 9780521347709.
- Runciman, Steven (1952). A History of the Crusades, Volume Two: The Kingdom of Jerusalem and the Frankish East, 1100–1187. Cambridge University Press. ISBN 9780521347716.
- Runciman, Steven (1954). A History of the Crusades, Volume Three: The Kingdom of Acre and the Later Crusades. Cambridge University Press. ISBN 9780521347723.
- Setton, Kenneth M., ed. (1969–1989). A History of the Crusades. Six Volumes. University of Wisconsin Press.
- Tyerman, Christopher (2006). God's War: A New History of the Crusades. Belknap Press. ISBN 9780674023871.
- Tyerman, Christopher (2009). The Crusades. Sterling Publishing Company. ISBN 9781402768910.

Dictionaries and Encyclopedias

- Andrea, Alfred J. (2003). Encyclopedia of the Crusades. Bloomsbury Academic. ISBN 9780313316593.
- Maier, Christoph T. (2003). "Crusades" (PDF). In Catholic University of America (ed.). The New Catholic Encyclopedia. Thompson/Gale. pp. 405–415. ISBN 9780787640170.
- Murray, Alan V., ed. (2006). The Crusades: An Encyclopedia. ABC-CLIO. ISBN 9781576078624. Archived from the original on 2023-03-26.
- Slack, Corliss K. (2013). Historical Dictionary of the Crusades. Scarecrow Press. ISBN 9780810878303.

Historical Atlases

- Konstam, Angus (2002). Historical Atlas of the Crusades. Checkmark Books. ISBN 9780816049196.
- Riley-Smith, Jonathan (1991). The Atlas of the Crusades. Facts on File. ISBN 9780816021864.

Chronologies

- Hazard, Harry W. (1975). "Important Dates and Events, 1049–1571" (PDF). In Hazard, Harry W. (ed.). The Fourteenth and Fifteenth Centuries. Setton, Kenneth M. (ed.), A History of the Crusades, University of Wisconsin Press. pp. 667–676. ISBN 9780299066741.
- Riley-Smith, Jonathan (1999). "Chronology". In Riley-Smith, Jonathan (ed.). The Oxford History of the Crusades. Oxford University Press. pp. 390–401. ISBN 9780192853646.
- Venning, Timothy; Frankopan, Peter (2015). A Chronology of the Crusades. Taylor & Francis. ISBN 9781317496434.

== Crusades to the Holy Land ==
First Crusade

- Asbridge, Thomas (2004). The First Crusade: A New History. Oxford University Press. ISBN 9780195178234.
- France, John (1994). Victory in the East: A Military History of the First Crusade. Cambridge University Press. ISBN 9780521589871.
- Frankopan, Peter (2012). The First Crusade: The Call from the East. Bodley Head. ISBN 9781847921550.
- Lapina, Elizabeth (2015). Warfare and the Miraculous in the Chronicles of the First Crusade. Pennsylvania State University Press. ISBN 9780271073118.
- Riley-Smith, Jonathan (1997). The First Crusaders, 1095–1131. Cambridge University Press. ISBN 9780521646031.
- Riley-Smith, Jonathan (2002). The First Crusade and Idea of Crusading. Bloomsbury Academic. ISBN 9780826467263.
- Runciman, Steven (1992). The First Crusade. Cambridge University Press. ISBN 9780521427050.

Establishment of the Kingdom

- Asbridge, Thomas (2013). "Baldwin II of Jerusalem's Campaigns against Aleppo (1124–1125) and Damascus (1129)". In Rogers, Clifford J.; DeVries, Kelly; France, John (eds.). Journal of Medieval Military History: Volume XI. Boydell & Brewer. pp. 73–94. ISBN 978-1-84383-860-9. JSTOR 10.7722/j.ctt31njvf.
- Brett, Michael (2019). "The Battles of Ramla, 1099–1105". The Fatimids and Egypt. Routledge. pp. 207–228. doi:10.4324/9780429427695-15. ISBN 9780429427695.
- Cate, James L. (1969). "The Crusade of 1101" (PDF). In Baldwin, Marshall W. (ed.). The First Hundred Years. Setton, Kenneth M. (ed.), A History of the Crusades, University of Wisconsin Press. pp. 343–367. ISBN 9780299048341.
- Morton, Nicholas (2018). The Field of Blood, the Battle for Aleppo and the Remaking of the Medieval Middle East. Basic Books. ISBN 9780465096701.
- Phillips, Jonathan P. (1996). Defenders of the Holy Land: The Relation between the Latin East and the West, 1119–1187. Clarendon Press. ISBN 9780198205401.
- Phillips, Jonathan P. (2007). "The Fall of Edessa, December 1144". The Second Crusade. Prologue. Yale University Press. pp. xvii–xxii. doi:10.12987/9780300168365-005. ISBN 9780300112740.
- Riley-Smith, Jonathan (1986). The Venetian Crusade of 1122–1124. De Ri Militari.
- Smail, Raymond C. (1995). Crusading Warfare, 1097–1193. Cambridge University Press. ISBN 9780521458382.

Second Crusade

- Gervers, Michael, ed. (2016). The Second Crusade and the Cisercians. Palgrave Macmillan US. ISBN 9781137068644.
- Phillips, Jonathan P. (2007). The Second Crusade: Extending the Frontiers of Christendom. Yale University Press. ISBN 9780300112740.

Third Crusade

- Hosler, Alan D. (2018). The Siege of Acre, 1189–1191: Saladin, Richard the Lionheart, and the Battle that Decided the Third Crusade. Yale University Press. ISBN 9780300215502.
- McLynn, Frank (2007). Lionheart and Lackland: King Richard, King John and the Wars of Conquest. ISBN 9780712694179.
- Nicholson, Helen J.; Nicolle, David (2005). God's Warriors: Crusaders, Saracens and the Battle for Jerusalem. Bloomsbury. ISBN 9781841769431.
- Nicolle, David (2005). The Third Crusade, 1191: Richard the Lionheart, Saladin and the Struggle for Jerusalem. Bloomsbury USA. ISBN 9781841768687.

Fourth Crusade

- Nicolle, David (2011). The Fourth Crusade, 1202–1204: The Betrayal of Byzantium. Bloomsbury Publishing. ISBN 9781849088213.
- Phillips, Jonathan P. (2005). The Fourth Crusade and the Sack of Constantinople. Penguin Publishing Group. ISBN 9781101127728.
- Queller, Donald E.; Madden, Thomas F. (1999). The Fourth Crusade: The Conquest of Constantinople. University of Pennsylvania Press. ISBN 9780812217131.

Fifth Crusade

- Donovan, Joseph P. (1950). Pelagius and the Fifth Crusade. University of Pennsylvania Press. ISBN 9781512801491.
- Moses, Paul (2009). The Saint and the Sultan: The Crusades, Islam, and Francis of Assisi's Mission of Peace. Doubleday. ISBN 9780385523707.
- Powell, James M. (1986). Anatomy of a Crusade, 1213–1221. University of Pennsylvania Press. ISBN 9780812280258.

Sixth Crusade

- Abulafia, David (1992). Frederick II: A Medieval Emperor. Oxford University Press. ISBN 9780195080407.
- Stürner, Wolfgang (2009). Friedrich II. 1194–1250. Primus-Verlag. ISBN 9783534230402.

Barons' Crusade

- Jackson, Peter (1987). "The Crusades of 1239–1241 and their Aftermath". Bulletin of the School of Oriental and African Studies, University of London. 50 (1). Bulletin of the School of Oriental and African Studies, Vol. 50, No. 1, pgs. 32-60: 32–60. JSTOR 616893.
- Lower, Michael (2005). The Barons' Crusade: A Call to Arms and its Consequences. University of Pennsylvania Press. ISBN 9780812238730.

Crusades of Louis IX

- Bartlett, W. B. (2007). The Last Crusade: The Seventh Crusade and the Final Battle for the Holy Land. Tempus. ISBN 9780752443898.
- Jordan, William C. (2015). Louis IX and the Challenge of the Crusade. Princeton University Press. ISBN 9781400869664.
- Lower, Michael (2018). The Tunis Crusade of 1270: A Mediterranean History. Oxford University Press. ISBN 978-0198744320.
- Richard, Jean C. (1992). Saint Louis, Crusader King of France. Cambridge University Press. ISBN 9780521381567.

Lord Edward's Crusade

- Baldwin, Philip Bruce (2014). Pope Gregory X and the Crusades. Boydell & Brewer Ltd. ISBN 9781843839163.
- Prestwich, Michael (1988). Edward I. University of California Press. ISBN 9780520062665.
- Summerson, Henry (2005). Lord Edward's Crusade. Oxford Dictionary of National Biography.

Fall of Outremer

- Crowley, Roger (2019). The Accursed Tower: The Fall of Acre and the End of the Crusades. Basic Books. ISBN 9781541697348.
- Marshall, Christopher J. (1994). Warfare in the Latin East, 1192–1291. Cambridge University Press. ISBN 9780521477420.
- Nicolle, David (2005). Acre 1291: Bloody Sunset of the Crusader States. Bloomsbury USA. ISBN 9781841768625.
- Schein, Sylvia (1991). Fideles Crucis: The Papacy, the West, and the Recovery of the Holy Land, 1274-1314. Clarendon Press. ISBN 9780198221654.

== Crusader states ==
Works on the Crusader states.

- Asbridge, Thomas (2000). The Creation of the Principality of Antioch, 1098–1130. Boydell & Brewer. ISBN 9780851156613.
- Barber, Malcolm (2012). The Crusader States. Yale University Press. ISBN 9780300189315.
- Edbury, Peter W. (1991). The Kingdom of Cyprus and the Crusades, 1191–1374. Cambridge University Press. ISBN 9780521268769.
- Edbury, Peter W., ed. (1999). Kingdoms of the Crusaders: From Jerusalem to Cyprus. Ashgate. ISBN 9780860787921.
- Ellenblum, Ronnie (2003). Frankish Rural Settlement in the Latin Kingdom of Jerusalem. Cambridge University Press. ISBN 9780521521871.
- Ghazarian, Jacob G. (2000). The Armenian Kingdom in Cilicia during the Crusades: The Integration of Cilician Armenians with the Latins, 1080–1393. Curzon Press. ISBN 9780700714186.
- Hamilton, Bernard (1980). The Latin Church in the Crusader States. Variorum Publications. ISBN 9780860780724.
- Holt, Peter M. (2004). The Crusader States and Their Neighbours, 1098–1291. Pearson Longman. ISBN 9780582369313.
- Kedar, Benjamin Z. (1999). "On the Origins of the Earliest Laws of Frankish Jerusalem: The Canons of the Council of Nablus". Speculum. 74 (2): 310–35. JSTOR 2887049.
- La Monte, John L. (1932). Feudal monarchy in the Latin kingdom of Jerusalem, 1100 to 1291. Monographs of the Medieval Academy of America.
- Prawer, Joshua (1972). The Crusaders' Kingdom. Phoenix Press. ISBN 9781842122242.
- Prawer, Joshua (1975). Histoire du Royaume Latin de Jérusalem. Centre national de la recherche scientifique. ISBN 9782222013174.
- Richard, Jean C. (1979). The Latin Kingdom of Jerusalem [Le royaume latin de Jérusalem]. Translated by Shirley, Janet. Amsterdam, North Holland. ISBN 9780444852625.
- Riley-Smith, Jonathan (1973). The Feudal Nobility and the Kingdom of Jerusalem, 1174–1277. Macmillan. ISBN 9780333063798.

Biographies and Genealogies

- Edbury, Peter W. (1997). John of Ibelin and the Kingdom of Jerusalem. Boydell Press. ISBN 9780851157030.
- Edgington, Susan B. (2019). Baldwin I of Jerusalem, 1100–1118. Routledge. ISBN 9781472433565.
- Hamilton, Bernard (2005). The Leper King and His Heirs: Baldwin IV and the Crusader Kingdom of Jerusalem. Cambridge University Press. ISBN 9780521017473.
- Murray, Alan V. (2000). The Crusader Kingdom of Jerusalem: A Dynastic History, 1099–1125. Prosopographica et Genealogica. ISBN 9781900934039.
- Lewis, Kevin J. (2017). The Counts of Tripoli and Lebanon in the Twelfth Century: Sons of Saint-Gilles. Routledge. ISBN 9781472458902.
- Perry, Guy (2013). John of Brienne: King of Jerusalem, Emperor of Constantinople, c. 1175–1237. Cambridge University Press. ISBN 9781107043107.

== Islamic world ==
Works on and from the Muslim world, including the periods preceding the Crusades, and its interactions with them.

- Bosworth, Clifford E. (2004). The New Islamic dynasties: A Chronological and Genealogical Manual. Edinburgh University Press. ISBN 9780748606849.
- Cahen, Claude (1968). Pre-Ottoman Turkey: A General Survey of the Material and Spiritual Culture and History, c. 1071–1330. Taplinger Publishing Company. ISBN 9781597404563.
- Christie, Niall (2014). Muslims and Crusaders: Christianity's Wars in the Middle East, 1095–1382, from the Islamic Sources. Routledge. ISBN 9781138543102.
- Cobb, Paul M. (2014). The Race for Paradise: An Islamic History of the Crusades. Oxford University Press. ISBN 9780199532018.
- Hillenbrand, Carole (1999). The Crusades: Islamic Perspectives. Routledge. ISBN 9780415929141.
- Hillebrand, Carole, ed. (2021). Islam and the Crusades: Collected Essays. Edinburgh University Press. ISBN 9781474485906.
- Hitti, Philip K. (1937). History of the Arabs: From the Earliest Time to the Present. Macmillan, New York.
- Irwin, Robert (1999). "Islam and the Crusades". In Riley-Smith, Jonathan (ed.). The Oxford History of the Crusades. Oxford University Press. pp. 211–257. ISBN 9780192853646.
- Kennedy, Hugh N. (2004). The Prophet and the Age of the Caliphates: The Islamic Near East from the Sixth to Eleventh Century. Pearson/Longman. ISBN 9780582405257.
- Maalouf, Amin (2006). The Crusades through Arab Eyes. Saqi Books. ISBN 9780863560231.

Levant and Persia

- El-Azhari, Taef (2016). Zengi and the Muslim Response to the Crusades: The Politics of Jihad. Routledge. ISBN 9780367870737.
- Gibb, H. A. R. (1969). "The Career of Nūr-ad-Din" (PDF). In Baldwin, Marshall W. (ed.). The First Hundred Years. Setton, Kenneth M. (ed.), A History of the Crusades, University of Wisconsin Press. pp. 513–527. ISBN 9780299048341.
- Humphreys, R. Stephen (1977). From Saladin to the Mongols: The Ayyubids of Damascus, 1193–1260. State University of New York. ISBN 9780873952637.
- Lewis, Bernard (2003). The Assassins: A Radical Sect in Islam. Phoenix. ISBN 9781842124512.
- Nicolle, David (2011). Saladin. Bloomsbury Publishing. ISBN 9781780962368.
- Peacock, Andrew C. S. (2015). The Great Seljuk Empire. Edinburgh University Press. ISBN 9780748638260.
- Phillips, Jonathan (2019). The Life and Legend of the Sultan Saladin. Yale University Press. ISBN 9780300249064.

Egypt

- Brett, Michael (2017). The Fatimid Empire. Edinburgh University Press. ISBN 9780748640768.
- Brett, Michael (2019). Fatimids and Egypt. Taylor & Francis Group. doi:10.4324/9780429427695. ISBN 9780429427695.
- Dorken, Adam (2015). Baybars: The Muslim Crusader. CreateSpace. ISBN 9781505776904.
- Fulton, Michael S. (2022). Contest for Egypt: The Collapse of the Fatimid Caliphate, the Ebb of Crusader Influence, and the Rise of Saladin. Brill. ISBN 9789004516250.
- Gibb, H. A. R. (1969). "The Aiyūbids" (PDF). In Wolff, Robert L.; Hazard, Harry W. (eds.). The Later Crusades, 1189–1311. Setton, Kenneth M. (ed.), A History of the Crusades, University of Wisconsin Press. pp. 693–714. ISBN 9780299068240.
- Irwin, Robert (1986). The Middle East in the Middle Ages: The Early Mamluk Sultanate, 1250–1382. Southern Illinois University Press. ISBN 9781597400480.
- Northrup, Linda (1998). From Slave to Sultan: The Career of Al-Manṣūr Qalāwūn and the Consolidation of Mamluk Rule in Egypt and Syria (678–689 A.H./1279–1290 A.D.). Franz Steiner Verlag, Stuttgart. ISBN 9783515068611.
- Petry, Carl F. (2022). The Mamluk Sultanate: A History. Cambridge University Press. ISBN 9781108471046.
- Waterson, James (2007). The Knights of Islam: The Wars of the Mamluks. London: Greenhill Books. ISBN 9781853677342.

Iberia

- Brett, Michael (1980). The Moors: Islam in the West. Orbis Publications. ISBN 9780856132797.
- Collins, Roger (1989). The Arab Conquest of Spain, 710–797. Wiley. ISBN 9780631194057.
- Harvey, Leonard Patrick (1992). Islamic Spain, 1250 to 1500. University of Chicago Press. ISBN 9780226319629.
- Harvey, Leonard Patrick (2005). Muslims in Spain, 1500–1614. University of Chicago Press. ISBN 9780226319636.
- Kennedy, Hugh N. (2014). Muslim Spain and Portugal: A Political History of Al-Andalus. Taylor & Francis. ISBN 9781317870401.
- Nicolle, David (2001). The Moors: The Islamic West, 7th–15th Centuries AD. Bloomsbury USA. ISBN 9781855329645.
- O'Callaghan, Joseph F. (1983). A History of Medieval Spain. Cornell University Press. ISBN 9780801492648.

Mongols

- Amitai-Preiss, Reuven (1995). Mongols and Mamluks: the Mamluk-Īlkhānid War, 1260–1281. Cambridge University Press. ISBN 9780521462266.
- Amitai-Preiss, Reuven; Morgan, David O., eds. (1999). The Mongol Empire and its Legacy. Brill. ISBN 9789004110489.
- Jackson, Peter (2005). The Mongols and the West: 1221–1410. Pearson Longman. ISBN 9780582368965.
- Roux, Jean-Paul (1993). Histoire de l'Empire Mongol. Fayard. ISBN 9782213031644.
- Sinor, Denis (1999). "The Mongols in the West". Journal of Asian History. 33 (1). Journal of Asian History, Vol. 33, No. 1: 1–44. JSTOR 41933117.

Timurids

- Bernardini, Michele (2016). "Tīmūr and the Frankish Powers" (PDF). In Housley, Norman (ed.). The Crusade in the Fifteenth Century. Taylor & Francis Group. ISBN 9781315615158.
- Marozzi, Justin (2005). Tamerlane: Sword of Islam, Conqueror of the World. Harper Perennial. ISBN 9780007116126.

== Byzantine Empire ==
- Angold, Michael (1997). The Byzantine Empire, 1026–1204. Longman. ISBN 9780582294684.
- Angold, Michael (2003). The Fourth Crusade: Event and Context. Longman. ISBN 9780582356108.
- Angold, Michael (2014). Fall of Constantinople to the Ottomans: Context and Consequences. Taylor & Francis. ISBN 9781317880523.
- Dalven, Rachel (1972). Anna Comnena. Twayne Publishers. ISBN 9780805722406.
- Geanakoplos, Deno (1959). Emperor Michael Palaeologus and the West, 1258–1282. Harvard University Press. ISBN 9781258023911.
- Kaldellis, Anthony (2017). Streams of Gold, Rivers of Blood: The Rise and Fall of Byzantium, 955 AD to the First Crusade. Oxford University Press. ISBN 9780190253226.
- Kazhdan, Alexander P. (2005). Oxford Dictionary of Byzantium. Oxford University Press. ISBN 9780195046526.
- Lilie, Ralph-Johannes (1993). Byzantium and the Crusader States, 1096–1204. Clarendon Press. ISBN 9780198204077.
- Lock, Peter (1995). The Franks in the Aegean 1204-1500. Routledge. ISBN 9781317899716.
- Magdalino, Paul (1996). Byzantine Backgroup to the First Crusade. Canadian Institute of Balkan Studies. ISBN 9781896566061.
- Magdalino, Paul (2002). The Empire of Manuel I Komnenos, 1143–1180. Cambridge University Press. ISBN 9780521526531.
- Nicol, Donald M. (1993). The Last Centuries of Byzantium, 1261–1453. Cambridge University Press. ISBN 9780521439916.
- Nicolle, David (2013). Manzikert 1071: The Breaking of Byzantium. Bloomsbury Publishing. ISBN 9781780965055.
- Treadgold, Warren T. (1997). A History of the Byzantine State and Society. Stanford University Press. ISBN 9780804726306.

Latin Empire of Constantinople

- Fine, John V. A. (1994). The Late Medieval Balkans: A Critical Survey from the Late Twelfth Century to the Ottoman Conquest. University of Michigan Press. ISBN 9780472082605.
- Miller, William (1908). The Latins in the Levant: A History of Frankish Greece (1204–1566). J. Murray.
- Runciman, Steven (2009). Lost Capital of Byzantium The History of Mistra and the Peloponnese. I. B. Tauris. ISBN 9780857718105.
- Setton, Kenneth M. (1948). Catalan Domination of Athens, 1311–1388. Mediaeval Academy of America. ASIN B0043KM3DU.

== Ottoman Empire ==
- Agoston, Gabor; Masters, Bruce (2010). Encyclopedia of the Ottoman Empire. Facts On File, Inc. ISBN 9781438110257.
- Agoston, Gabor (2021). The Last Muslim Conquest: The Ottoman Empire and Its Wars in Europe. Princeton University Press. ISBN 9780691159324.
- Babinger, Franz (1978). Mehmed the Conqueror and his Time. Princeton University Press. ISBN 9780691010786.
- Clot, André (2012). Suleiman the Magnificent. Saqi Books. ISBN 9780863568039.
- Creasy, Edward Shepherd (1878). History of the Ottoman Turks from the beginning of their empire to the present time. New York, H. Holt. ISBN 9780608354897.
- Finkel, Caroline (2006). Osman's Dream: The Story of the Ottoman Empire 1300–1923. Basic Books. ISBN 9780465023967.
- Freely, John (2009). The Grand Turk: Sultan Mehmet II, Conqueror of Constantinople and Master of an Empire. Overlook. ISBN 9781845117047.
- Har-El, Shai (1995). Struggle for Domination in the Middle East: The Ottoman-Mamluk War, 1485–1491. E. J. Brill. ISBN 9789004101807.
- Imber, Colin (1990). The Ottoman Empire, 1300–1481. Isis Press. ISBN 978-975-428-015-9.
- Imber, Colin (2002). The Ottoman Empire,1300–1650: The Structure of Power. Palgrave Macmillan. ISBN 9780333613863.
- İnalcık, Halil (1973). The Ottoman Empire: The Classical Age, 1300–1600. Weidenfeld & Nicolson. ISBN 9780892413881.
- İnalcık, Halil (1989). "The Ottoman Turks and the Crusades, 1329–1451" (PDF). In Hazard, Harry (ed.). Impact of the Crusades on Europe. Setton, Kenneth M. (ed.), A History of the Crusades, University of Wisconsin Press. pp. 222–275. ISBN 9780299107444.
- İnalcık, Halil (1989). "The Ottoman Turks and the Crusades, 1451–1522" (PDF). In Hazard, Harry (ed.). Impact of the Crusades on Europe. Setton, Kenneth M. (ed.), A History of the Crusades, University of Wisconsin Press. pp. 311–353. ISBN 9780299107444.
- Kastritsis, Dimitris (2007). The Sons of Bayezid: Empire Building and Representation in the Ottoman Civil War, 1402–1413. Brill. ISBN 9789047422471.
- Nicolle, David (1983). Armies of the Ottoman Turks, 1300–1774. Bloomsbury USA. ISBN 9780850455113.
- Nicolle, David; Hook, Christa (1995). The Janissaries. Bloomsbury USA. ISBN 9781855324138.
- Turnbull, Stephen (2003). The Ottoman Empire, 1326–1699. Routledge. ISBN 9780415969130.

== The later crusades ==
General

- Atiya, Aziz Suryal (1938). The Crusade in the Later Middle Ages. Methuen. ISBN 9780527037000.
- Atiya, Aziz Suryal (1975). "The Crusade in the Fourteenth Century" (PDF). In Hazard, Harry W. (ed.). The Fourteenth and Fifteenth Centuries. Setton, Kenneth M. (ed.), A History of the Crusades, University of Wisconsin Press. pp. 3–26. ISBN 9780299066741.
- Housley, Norman (1992). The Later Crusades, 1274–1580: From Lyons to Alcazar. Oxford University Press. ISBN 9780198221364.
- Housley, Norman, ed. (2004). Crusading in the Fifteenth Century: Message and Impact. Springer Link. doi:10.1057/9780230523357. ISBN 9781403902832.
- Housley, Norman, ed. (2016). The Crusade in the Fifteenth Century: Converging and Competing Cultures. Taylor & Francis Group. ISBN 9781315615158.
- Housley, Norman, ed. (2017). Reconfiguring the Fifteenth-Century Crusade. Palgrave Macmillian UK. ISBN 9781137462817.
- Setton, Kenneth M. (1976). The Papacy and the Levant, 1204-1571: Volume I: The Thirteenth and Fourteenth Centuries. American Philosophical Society. ISBN 9780871691149.
- Setton, Kenneth M. (1976). The Papacy and the Levant, 1204–1571, Volume II: The Fifteenth Century. American Philosophical Society. ISBN 9780871691149.
- Setton, Kenneth M. (1976). The Papacy and the Levant, 1204–1571, Volume III: The Sixteenth Century to the Reign of Julius III. American Philosophical Society. ISBN 9780871691149.
- Setton, Kenneth M. (1976). The Papacy and the Levant, 1204–1571, Volume IV: The Sixteenth Century from Julius III to Pius V. American Philosophical Society. ISBN 9780871691149.

Northern Crusades

- Christiansen, Eric (1997). The Northern Crusades. Penguin Books. ISBN 9780140266535.
- Kiaupa, Zigmantas (2000). The History of Lithuania before 1795. Lithuanian Institute of History. ISBN 9789986810131.
- Lindholm, David; Nicolle, David (2007). The Scandinavian Baltic Crusades, 1100–1500. Bloomsbury USA. ISBN 9781841769882.
- Murray, Alan V., ed. (2001). Crusade and Conversion on the Baltic Frontier 1150–1500. Routledge. ISBN 9780754603252.
- Murray, Alan V., ed. (2009). The Clash of Cultures on the Medieval Baltic Frontier. Routledge. ISBN 9780754664833.
- Turnbull, Stephen (2005). Tannenberg, 1410: Disaster for the Teutonic Knights. Praeger. ISBN 9780275988609.
- Urban, William L. (1975). The Baltic Crusade. Northern Illinois University Press. ISBN 9780875800523.
- Urban, William L. (2006). The Samogitian Crusade. Lithuanian Research and Studies Center. ISBN 9780929700038.

Popular Crusades

- Bréhier, Louis (1911). "Crusade of the Pastoureaux" . In Herbermann, Charles (ed.). Catholic Encyclopedia. Vol. 11. New York: Robert Appleton Company.
- Flori, Jean (1999). Pierre l'Ermite et la première Croisade. Fayard. ISBN 9782213648248.
- Zacour, Norman P. (1969). "The Children's Crusade" (PDF). In Wolff, Robert L.; Hazard, Harry W. (eds.). The Later Crusades, 1189–1311. Setton, Kenneth M. (ed.), A History of the Crusades, University of Wisconsin Press. pp. 325–342. ISBN 9780299068240.

Italian Crusades

- Housley, Norman (1982). The Italian Crusades: The Papal-Angevin Alliance and the Crusades Against Christian Lay Powers, 1254–1343. Oxford University Press. ISBN 9780198219255.
- Mallett, Michael E. (2014). The Italian Wars, 1494–1559. Taylor & Francis. ISBN 9781317899396.

Crusades against Christians

- Barber, Malcolm (2017). The Cathars: Dualist Heretics in Languedoc in the High Middle Ages. Taylor & Francis. ISBN 9781351223966.
- Roquebert, Michel (1970–1998). L'épopée cathare. Five volumes. Toulouse: Privat.
- Strayer, Joseph R. (1971). The Albigensian Crusades. New York: The Dial Press. ISBN 9780472064762.
- Sumption, Jonathan (1978). The Albigensian Crusade. Faber. ISBN 9780571110643.
- Turnbull, Stephen (2004). The Hussite Wars, 1419–1436. Bloomsbury USA. ISBN 9781841766652.

Political Crusades

- Runciman, Steven (1958). The Sicilian Vespers: A History of the Mediterranean World in the Later Thirteenth Century. Cambridge University Press. ISBN 9781107604742.
- Strayer, Joseph R. (1969). "The Political Crusades of the Thirteenth Century" (PDF). In Wolff, Robert L.; Hazard, Harry W. (eds.). The Later Crusades, 1189–1311. Setton, Kenneth M. (ed.), A History of the Crusades, University of Wisconsin Press. pp. 341–376. ISBN 9780299068240.

Reconquista

- Bishko, Charles J. (1975). "The Spanish and Portuguese Reconquest, 1095–1492" (PDF). In Hazard, Harry W. (ed.). The Fourteenth and Fifteenth Centuries. Setton, Kenneth M. (ed.), A History of the Crusades, University of Wisconsin Press. pp. 396–456. ISBN 9780299066741.
- Chaytor, Henry John (1933). A History of Aragon and Catalonia. Methuen. ISBN 9780404014797.
- Diffie, Bailey Wallys (1977). Foundations of the Portuguese Empire, 1415–1580. University of Minnesota Press. ISBN 9780816608508.
- Disney, A. R. (2009). A History of Portugal and the Portuguese Empire. Cambridge University Press. ISBN 9780511813337.
- Edwards, John (2016). "Reconquista and Crusade in Fifteenth Century Spain". In Housley, Norman (ed.). Crusading in the Fifteenth Century: Message and Impact. Springer Link. doi:10.1057/9780230523357_7. ISBN 9781403902832.
- Hillgarth, J. N. (1978). The Spanish Kingdoms, 1250–1516. Clarendon Press. ISBN 9780198225317.
- Lardner, Dionysius (1833). History of Spain and Portugal. Philadelphia: Carey & Lea.
- Lomax, Derek W. (1978). The Reconquest of Spain. Longman. ISBN 9780582502093.
- Nicolle, David (1988). El Cid and the Reconquista,1050–1492. Bloomsbury USA. ISBN 9780850458404.
- O'Callaghan, Joseph F. (2011). The Gibraltar Crusade: Castile and the Battle for the Strait. University of Pennsylvania Press. ISBN 9780850458404.
- O'Callaghan, Joseph F. (2013). Reconquest and Crusade in Medieval Spain. University of Pennsylvania Press. ISBN 9780812203066.
- O'Callaghan, Joseph F. (2014). The Last Crusade in the West: Castile and the Conquest of Granada. University of Pennsylvania Press. ISBN 9780812209358.

Ottoman Crusades

- Allen, Bruce W. (2015). The Great Siege of Malta. University Press of New England. ISBN 9781611688436.
- Aloisio, Mark (2016). "Alfonso V and the Anti-Turkish Crusade". In Housley, Norman (ed.). The Crusade in the Fifteenth Century: Converging and Competing Cultures. Taylor & Francis Group. ISBN 9781315615158.
- Atiya, Aziz Suryal (1934). The Crusade of Nicopolis. Methuen & Company, Limited. ISBN 9780404154103.
- Barleti, Marin (2012). The Siege of Shkodra: Albanian's Courageous Stand Against Ottoman Conquest, 1478. Tirana Times. ISBN 9789995687779.
- Brockman, Eric (1969). The Two Sieges of Rhodes, 1480–1522. J. Murray. ISBN 9780719518942.
- Finkel, Caroline (1988). The Administration of Warfare: The Ottoman Military Campaigns in Hungary, 1593–1606. VWGÖ. ISBN 3853697089.
- Florescu, Radu (2009). Dracula, Prince of Many Faces: His Life and Times. Little, Brown. ISBN 9780316092265.
- Géza, Perjés (1989). The Fall of the Medieval Kingdom of Hungary: Mohács, 1526 – Buda, 1541. Social Science Monographs. ISBN 9780880351522.
- Hodgkinson, Henry (1999). Scanderbeg: From Ottoman Captive to Albanian Hero. Learning Design. ISBN 9781903616154.
- Housley, Norman (2016). "Giovanni da Capistrano and the Crusade of 1456". In Housley, Norman (ed.). Crusading in the Fifteenth Century: Message and Impact. Springer Link. pp. 94–115. doi:10.1057/9780230523357_7. ISBN 9781403902832.
- Imber, Colin (2013). The Crusade of Varna, 1443–1445. Ashgate Publishing. ISBN 9781472416940.
- Jefferson, John (2012). The Holy Wars of King Wladislas and Sultan Murad: The Ottoman-Christian Conflict from 1438–1444. Brill. ISBN 9789004219045.
- Mixson, James (2022). The Crusade of 1456. University of Toronto Press. ISBN 9781487505769.
- Nicolle, David (2005). Constantinople, 1453: The End of Byzantium. Praeger. ISBN 9780275988562.
- Pilat, Liviu (2017). The Ottoman Threat and Crusading on the Eastern Border of Christendom During the 15th Century. Brill. ISBN 9789004353800.
- Runciman, Steven (1965). The Fall of Constantinople, 1453. Cambridge University Press. ISBN 9780521398329.
- Setton, Kenneth M. (1991). Venice, Austria, and the Turks in the Seventeenth Century. American Philosophical Society. ISBN 9780871691927.
- Shirogorov, Vladimir (2021). War on the Eve of Nations: Conflicts and Militaries in Eastern Europe, 1450–1500. Lexington Books. ISBN 9781793622419.

== Military orders ==
Works on military orders.

- Forey, Alan (1999). "The Military Orders, 1120–1312". In Riley-Smith, Jonathan (ed.). The Oxford History of the Crusades. Oxford University Press. pp. 176–210. ISBN 9780192853646.
- Luttrell, Anthony T. (1999). "The Military Orders, 1312–1798". In Riley-Smith, Jonathan (ed.). The Oxford History of the Crusades. Oxford University Press. pp. 323–362. ISBN 9780192853646.
- Nicholson, Helen J. (1993). Templars, Hospitallers, and Teutonic Knights: Images of the Military Orders, 1128-1291. Leicester University Press. ISBN 9780718514112.

Knights Hospitaller

- Brownstein, Judith (2005). The Hospitallers and the Holy Land: Financing the Latin East, 1187-1274. Boydell Press. ISBN 9781843831310.
- Delaville Le Roulx, Joseph (1904). Les Hospitaliers en Terre Sainte et à Chypre (1100-1310). E. Leroux, Paris.
- Demurger, Alain (2013). Les Hospitaliers, De Jérusalem à Rhodes 1050-1317. Tallandier, Paris. ISBN 9791021000605.
- Luttrell, Anthony T. (1982). Latin Greece, the Hospitallers, and the Crusades, 1291-1440. University of Michigan. ISBN 9780860781066.
- Nicholson, Helen J. (2001). The Knights Hospitaller. Boydell & Brewer. ISBN 9781843830382.
- Nicolle, David (2001). Knights Hospitaller, 1100–1306. Bloomsbury USA. ISBN 9781841762142.
- Riley-Smith, Jonathan (2012). The Knights Hospitaller in the Levant, c. 1070-1309. Palgrave Macmillan. ISBN 9780230290839.

Knights Templar

- Barber, Malcolm (1994). The New Knighthood. A History of the Order of the Temple. Cambridge University Press. ISBN 9781107604735.
- Barber, Malcolm (2006). The Trial of the Templars. Cambridge University Press. ISBN 9781139458429.
- Demurger, Alain (2009). The Last Templar: The Tragedy of Jacques de Molay. Profile Books. ISBN 9781846682247.
- Frale, Barbara (2011). The Templars: The Secret History Revealed. Arcade. ISBN 9781611450194.
- Howarth, Stephen (1982). Knights Templar. Marboro Books, New York. ISBN 9780002164528.
- Nicholson, Helen J. (2001). The Knights Templar: A New History. Sutton Publishing. ISBN 9780750925174.

Teutonic Knights

- Nicolle, David (2007). Teotonic Knights, 1190–1561. Bloomsbury USA. ISBN 9781846030758.
- Urban, William L. (2003). The Teutonic Knights: A Military History. Greenhill. ISBN 978-1-85367-535-5.
- Urban, William L. (2018). The Last Years of the Teutonic Knights: Lithuania, Poland and the Teutonic Order. Greenhill Books. ISBN 9781784383589.

== Related works ==
- Allen, S. J.; Amt, Emilie (2014). The Crusades: A Reader. University of Toronto Press. ISBN 9781442606258.
- Atiya, Aziz Suryal (1975). "The Aftermath of the Crusades" (PDF). In Hazard, Harry W. (ed.). The Fourteenth and Fifteenth Centuries. Setton, Kenneth M. (ed.), A History of the Crusades, University of Wisconsin Press. pp. 647–666. ISBN 9780299066741.
- Weber, Benjamin (2004). Crusade: The Uses of a Word from the Middle Ages to the Present. Routledge. ISBN 9781032442365.

Women and the Crusades

- Edgington, Susan; Lambert, Sarah (2002). Gendering the Crusades. Columbia University Press. ISBN 9780231125994.
- Hodgson, Natasha R. (2007). Women, Crusading and the Holy Land in Historical Narrative. Boydell Press. ISBN 9781843833321.
- Luttrell, Anthony T.; Nicholson, Helen J., eds. (2006). Hospitaller Women in the Middle Ages. Ashgate. ISBN 9780754606468.
- Nicholson, Helen J. (2023). Women in the Crusades. Oxford University Press. ISBN 9780192529527.

Preaching the Crusades

- Alphandéry, Paul; Dupront, Alphonse (1959). La Chrétienté et l'idée de croisade. Albin Michel. ISBN 9782226296320.
- Brundage, James A. (1969). Medieval Canon Law and the Crusader. University of Wisconsin Press. ISBN 9780299054809.
- Cole, Penny J. (1991). The Preaching of the Crusades to the Holy Land, 1095–1270. Medieval Academy of America. ISBN 9780915651030.
- Jotischky, Andrew (1995). The Perfection of Solitude: Hermits and Monks in the Crusader States. Pennsylvania State University Press. ISBN 9780271028316.
- Maier, Christoph T. (1998). Preaching the Crusades: Mendicant Friars and the Cross in the Thirteenth Century. Cambridge University Press. ISBN 9780521638739.

The Papacy

- Housley, Norman (1986). The Avignon Papacy and the Crusades, 1305–1378. Clarendon Press. ISBN 9780198219576.
- Purcell, Maureen (1975). Papal Crusading Policy, 1244–1291. Brill. ISBN 9789004043176.

Crusading Movement

- Erdmann, Carl (1977). The Origin of the Idea of Crusade. Translated by Baldwin, Marshall W.; Goffart, Walter. Princeton University Press. ISBN 9781597407984.
- Jotischky, Andrew (2004). Crusading and the Crusader States. Pearson Longman. ISBN 9781351983921.
- Kedar, Benjamin Z. (2014). Crusade and Mission: European Approaches to the Muslims. Princeton University Press. ISBN 9781400855612.
- Riley-Smith, Jonathan (1977). What Were the Crusades. Rowman and Littlefield. ISBN 9780874719444.
- Russell, Frederick H. (1975). Just War in the Middle Ages. Cambridge University Press. ISBN 9780521292764.
- Tyerman, Christopher (1998). The Invention of the Crusades. University of Toronto Press. ISBN 9780802081858.

England

- Lloyd, Simon D. (1988). English Society and the Crusade, 1216–1307. Clarendon Press. ISBN 9780198229490.
- Macquarrie, Alan (1997). Scotland and the Crusades, 1095–1560. John Donald. ISBN 9780859764452.
- Tyerman, Christopher (1996). England and the Crusades, 1095–1588. University of Chicago Press. ISBN 9780226820125.

Archaeology

- Boas, Adrian J. (2009). Jerusalem in the Time of the Crusades: Society, Landscape and Art in the Holy City Under Frankish Rule. Routledge. ISBN 9780415230001.
- Kennedy, Hugh N. (1994). Crusader Castles. Cambridge University Press. ISBN 9780521799133.
- Lawrence, T. E. (1988). Pringle, Denys (ed.). Crusader Castles. Clarendon Press. ISBN 9780198229643.
- Nicolle, David (2005). Crusader Castles in the Holy Land 1192–1302. Bloomsbury. ISBN 9781841768274.
- Pringle, Denys (1997). Secular Buildings in the Crusader Kingdom of Jerusalem: An Archaeological Gazetteer. Cambridge University Press. ISBN 9780521460101.
- Pringle, Denys (2007). The Churches of the Crusader Kingdom of Jerusalem: The City of Jerusalem. Vol. III. Cambridge University Press. ISBN 9780521172837.
- Sinibaldi, Micaela; Major, Balázs; Thompson, Jennifer; Lewis, Kevin J., eds. (2016). Crusader Landscapes in the Medieval Levant: The Archaeology and History of the Latin East. University of Wales Press. ISBN 9781783169269.

Numismatics and sigillography

- Brown, Michael L.; Metcalf, D. M. (1989). "Crusader Coinage with Arabic Inscriptions" (PDF). In Hazard, Harry (ed.). Impact of the Crusades on Europe. Setton, Kenneth M. (ed.), A History of the Crusades, University of Wisconsin Press. pp. 421–473. ISBN 9780299107444.
- Porteous, John (1989). "Crusader Coinage with Greek or Latin Inscription" (PDF). In Hazard, Harry (ed.). Impact of the Crusades on Europe. Setton, Kenneth M. (ed.), A History of the Crusades, University of Wisconsin Press. pp. 354–387. ISBN 9780299107444.
- Sharon, Moshe (1997). Corpus Inscriptionum Arabicarum Palaestinae (CIAP). Brill. ISBN 9789004108332.

Art of the Crusades

- Folda, Jaroslav (2008). The Art of the Crusaders in the Holy Land, 1098–1187. Lund Humphries. ISBN 9780853319955.
- Folda, Jaroslav (2008). Crusader Art in the Holy Land: From the Third Crusade to the Fall of Acre, 1187–1291. Cambridge University Press. ISBN 9780521835831.
- Nersessian, Sirarpie Der (1945). Armenia and the Byzantine Empire: A Brief Study of Armenian Art and Civilization. Harvard University Press. ISBN 9780674863231.

== Other bibliographies ==
- Atiya, Aziz Suryal (1976). The Crusade: Historiography and Bibliography. Greenwood Press. ISBN 9780837183640.
- Bréhier, Louis (1908). "Crusades (Bibliography and Sources)" . In Herbermann, Charles (ed.). Catholic Encyclopedia. Vol. 4. New York: Robert Appleton Company.
- Mayer, Hans E. (1965). Bibliographie zur Geschichte der Kreuzzüge. Hahnsche Buchhandlung. ISBN 9783775251686.
- Mayer, Hans E.; McLellan, Helen (1989). "Select Bibliography of the Crusades" (PDF). In Hazard, Harry (ed.). VI. Impact of the Crusades on Europe. Setton, Kenneth M. (ed.), A History of the Crusades, University of Wisconsin Press. pp. 511–664. ISBN 9780299107444.

== See also ==
- A History of the Crusades: list of contributions
- Chronologies of the Crusades
- List of Modern Historians of the Crusades
