= The New Cambridge History of Islam =

Six volume history of Islam edited by Michael Cook

Volume I of The New Cambridge History of Islam

The New Cambridge History of Islam is a six volume history of Islam published by Cambridge University Press in 2010. The general editor is Michael Cook.

The history replaced the original Cambridge History of Islam which was published in 1970. As well as being greatly expanded from the earlier history, which was of two volumes, the new history introduces more thematic sections and covers wider ground by, for instance, a detailed examination of Sufism. It also cautiously questions the narrative of the history of Islam believed by Muslims which it finds lacks reliable textual evidence for the earliest period.

== Volumes ==
- Volume 1, The Formation of the Islamic World, Sixth to Eleventh Centuries. Edited by Chase F. Robinson, 2010.
- Volume 2, The Western Islamic World, Eleventh to Eighteenth Centuries. Edited by Maribel Fierro, 2010.
- Volume 3, The Eastern Islamic World, Eleventh to Eighteenth Centuries. Edited by David O. Morgan, Anthony Reid, 2010.
- Volume 4, Islamic Cultures and Societies to the End of the Eighteenth Century. Edited by Robert Irwin. 2010.
- Volume 5, The Islamic World in the Age of Western Dominance. Edited by Francis Robinson, 2010.
- Volume 6, Muslims and Modernity: Culture and Society since 1800.Edited by Robert W. Hefner, 2010.
