= Carl Stephenson (historian) =

American medieval scholar

Carl Stephenson (1886–1954) at the time of his death was regarded as one of America's foremost medieval scholars. He was a student of Charles Gross and Charles Homer Haskins at Harvard University (graduated 1914), later studied with Henri Pirenne at the University of Ghent (1924–25) and had close scholarly ties with other well-known medievalists of the first half of the 20th century. He taught mainly at the University of Wisconsin–Madison and Cornell University Department of History (1931–1941).

Primarily focused on documentary evidence, he was opposed to easy theorizing and glib generalizations. Carl Stephenson did his best work on those institutions found in medieval Europe between the Loire and the Rhine. Since he was writing far removed from western Europe and its acrimonious academic feuding, he dispassionately demolished much of the prejudiced nationalistic writing devoted to praising or damning Germanic or Latin institutions. His greatest joy came from demonstrating that a tax, a commune, or seignorialism and feudalism were not peculiar to one area but were common to all western Europe.

For fifteen years Carl Stephenson regularly published articles in the leading historical journals of America, England, Belgium, and France and established himself as an authority on taxation, representative assemblies, and the origin of urban institutions. His most mature work, Borough and Town, appeared in 1933; here he combined his research with scholarly methods developed on the Continent to show that the English borough was not an insular peculiarity but that it was like its continental counterpart in origin and constitution. He then turned his attention to seignorial and feudal institutions, work resulting in further articles including his 1942 classic essay Mediaeval Feudalism which has remained in print into the 21st century. His book, Medieval History: Europe from the Fourth to the Sixteenth Century, was for decades one of the most widely used textbooks in the field. He co-edited Sources of English Constitutional History with his Cornell colleague Frederick Marcham; the work is still considered a monumental achievement.
