= The Cambridge History of Islam =

2 volume work on the history of Islam

Volume I of The Cambridge History of Islam

The Cambridge History of Islam is a two volume history of Islam published by Cambridge University Press in 1970 and edited by Peter Holt, Ann K.S. Lambton, and Bernard Lewis. It was reprinted in 1977 with amendments and each volume divided into two for ease of use. It was replaced by the six-volume New Cambridge History of Islam in 2010.

== Aims and reception ==
The work was designed for undergraduate and graduate students who wanted an authoritative account of the history of Islam, and for the intelligent layman who enjoyed history. The editors also hoped that it would appeal to the "expert orientalist" and would be used for continuous reading rather than as a work of reference.

Reviewers agreed that the history was solid but unexciting with a generally cautious approach and lack of analysis, typical they felt, of the multi-authored history that represented a distillation of the consensus in a field rather than one that sought to explore new avenues of enquiry.

== Volumes ==
All volumes edited by Peter Holt, Ann K.S. Lambton, and Bernard Lewis.

=== 1970 edition ===
- Volume 1, The Central Islamic Lands
- Volume 2, The Further Islamic Lands, Islamic Society and Civilization

=== 1977 reprint ===
- Volume 1A, The Central Islamic Lands from Pre-Islamic Times to the First World War
- Volume 1B, The Central Islamic Lands since 1918
- Volume 2A, The Indian Sub-Continent, South-East Asia, Africa and the Muslim West
- Volume 2B, Islamic Society and Civilisation
