= Caroline Finkel =

British historian and writer

Caroline Finkel is a British historian and writer based in Turkey; she has a doctorate in Ottoman history from the School of Oriental and African Studies, University of London.

== Publications ==
Her book Osman's Dream: The History of the Ottoman Empire 1300-1923 was published by John Murray in England in 2005, and by Basic Books in the United States (ISBN 0-465-02396-7). A Greek translation appeared in 2007, Dutch in 2008, and Russian in 2010. The Turkish edition, Rüyadan İmparatorluğa: Osmanlı (2007) is in its fourth printing.

She has recently co-authored a guidebook of Turkey's first long-distance equestrian, hiking and biking route, the Evliya Çelebi Way. It is available in English and Turkish.

Other works include The Administration of Warfare: The Ottoman Military Campaigns in Hungary, 1593-1606 (1988), and The Seismicity of Turkey and Adjacent Areas : A Historical Review, 1500-1800 (1995, also in Turkish), written with N. N. Ambraseys.

She holds honorary fellowships at the University of Edinburgh in Scotland and the University of Exeter in England.
