= Peter Holt (historian) =

British historian (1918–2006)

Peter Malcolm Holt
- Born: 28 November 1918; Astley Village, Lancashire, England
- Died: 2 November 2006; Oxford

Academic background
- Education: University College, Oxford

Academic work
- Discipline: History of Sudan, History of the Middle East

Peter Malcolm Holt, FBA (28 November 1918 – 2 November 2006) was a historian of the Middle East and Sudan. He was generally known as P. M. Holt.

== Biography ==
The son of a Unitarian minister, Holt attended Lord Williams's School in Thame, Oxfordshire, and studied history at University College, Oxford. He then obtained a diploma of education and worked as a secondary school teacher in Anglo-Egyptian Sudan 1941–53 (initially at Gordon Memorial College, the country's leading school), and then as Government Archivist and part-time lecturer at the University College of Khartoum 1952–55. During these years he became proficient in Arabic.

Holt completed a DPhil at Oxford on "The personal rule of the Khalifa Abdallahi al-Ta'aishi", on the second ruler of the Sudanese Mahdist State (1885-1899), initially under the supervision of H.A.R. Gibb. He taught at SOAS, the University of London as Lecturer from 1955 to 1982, then Reader, then Professor of Arab History, and finally Professor of the Near and Middle East from 1975 to 1982.

== Research ==
Holt was the per-eminent historian of the Sudan. His first book, The Mahdist State in the Sudan 1881–1898. A Study of its Origins, Development, and Overthrow (1958) was based on his DPhil thesis, and was followed by A modern history of the Sudan, from the Funj Sultanate to the present day (1965, later republished as The history of the Sudan from the coming of Islam to the present day). He then expanded his interests geographically, publishing Egypt and the Fertile Crescent 1516-1922, A Political History in 1966). He then added a second field, becoming an authority on the Mamluk Sultanate, (1250–1517), publishing The memoirs of a Syrian prince: Abu'l-Fidā, Sultan of Ḥamāh (672-732) (1983) and Early Mamluk diplomacy (1260 - 1290): Treaties of Baybars and Qalāwūn with Christian rulers (1995). A general history of the Near East, The Age of the Crusades, The Near East from the Eleventh Century to 1517 was published in 1986.

Holt was also one of the founding editors of The Cambridge History of Islam, along with Ann K. S. Lambton and Bernard Lewis.

In 1999 Holt published The Sudan of the Three Niles: The Funj Chronicle, 910–1288/1504–1871, the first complete English translation of the Funj Chronicle. He based the translation on the Cairo recension of Makhṭūṭat Kātib al-Shūna, edited by Al-Shater Bossely Abdul Jalil, supplemented by manuscripts held in Istanbul, Nottingham, Vienna and Paris.

His work on Sudan was carried forward by one of his PhD students, Seán O'Fahey.

== Works ==
- Holt, P.M., The Mahdist State in the Sudan 1881–1898. A Study of its Origins, Development, and Overthrow (Oxford, 1958).
- Holt, P.M., A modern history of the Sudan, from the Funj Sultanate to the present day (London, 1965).
- Holt, P. M., Egypt and the Fertile Crescent 1516-1922, A Political History (London, 1966).
- Holt, P. M., Studies in the History of the Near East (London, 1973).
- Holt, P. M., Cambridge History of Islam (Cambridge, 1978).
- Holt, P. M., The memoirs of a Syrian prince : Abu'l-Fidā, Sultan of Ḥamāh (672-732) (Wiesbaden, 1983)
- Holt, P. M., The Age of the Crusades, The Near East from the Eleventh Century to 1517 (London, 1986).
- Holt, P. M., Early Mamluk diplomacy (1260 - 1290): Treaties of Baybars and Qalāwūn with Christian rulers (Leiden 1995).
- Holt, P. M., The Crusader States and Their Neighbours, 1098-1291 (Pearson 2004). ISBN 0-582-36931-2
- Holt, P. M., trans. and ed., The Sudan of the Three Niles: The Funj Chronicle, 910–1288/1504–1871 (Leiden: Brill, 1999). ISBN 978-90-04-11256-8.
