= Jean Flori =

French medieval historian

- Born: 7 April 1936; Lillebonne, France
- Died: 18 April 2018 (aged 82); Carnac, France
- Resting place: Père Lachaise Cemetery
- Occupation: Historian

Academic background
- Doctoral advisor: Georges Duby

Jean Flori (7 April 1936 – 18 April 2018) was a French medieval historian. He was a research director for the National Center for Scientific Research, and the author of books about chivalry and the Crusades. A student of Georges Duby, he is one of the twentieth century's "major historian[s] of chivalry".

== Biography ==
Flori studied science before devoting himself to theology and history. He earned a doctorate in literature and humanities from the Sorbonne (building), writing his thesis on chivalry in the 11th and 12th centuries, which was supervised by medievalist Georges Duby, becoming one of his most important disciples. At the same time, he embraced the Adventist faith and religion.

During his academic career, he was director of research at the French National Center for Scientific Research (Centre national de la recherche scientifique or CNRS) and the Center for Advanced Studies in Medieval Civilization (Centre d'études Supérieures de Civilisation Médiévale or CESCM) at the University of Poitiers.

Within his field of expertise, Flori focused on the study of chivalry and its ideology, which became the central theme of several of his works.However, he is also recognized for his work on the concept and idea of holy war Religious war the Middle Ages and the Crusades.
