= Louis Bréhier =

French historian (1868–1951)

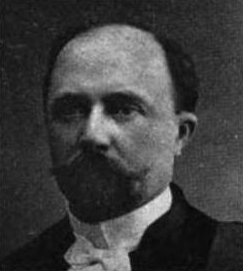
- Born: Louis René Bréhier; 5 August 1868; Brest, France
- Died: 13 October 1951 (aged 83); Reims, France
- Education: University of Paris
- Occupation: Historian
- Relatives: Émile Bréhier (brother)

Louis René Bréhier (French: [bʁeje]; 5 August 1868 – 13 October 1951) was a French historian who specialized in Byzantine studies. His brother was the philosopher Émile Bréhier.

== Biography ==
Louis Bréhier was born in Brest, France on 5 August 1868. He studied history and literature in Paris, obtaining his agrégation in history in 1892. Afterwards, he worked as a schoolteacher in Montauban, Bourges, Reims and Saint-Quentin (1892–99). In 1899 he received his doctorate at the Sorbonne with the dissertation Le schisme oriental du XI^{e} siècle ("The Eastern Schism in the 11th Century"). Bréhier became a professor at the University of Paris, teaching ancient and medieval history and geography. He presented a paper on "Les colonies d'Orientaux en Occident du Moyen Age" at the Thirteenth Congress of Orientalists in Hamburg in 1902.

From 1903 to 1938 he was professor of ancient and medieval history in Clermont-Ferrand. His travels were largely confined to the Mediterranean world that included an archaeological mission to Mount Athos in 1930. He settled in Reims after World War II and died in this city in 1951.

Bréhier's best-known work was the three-volume Le Monde byzantin ("The Byzantine World"). He was a specialist of Byzantine iconography, and in 1924 published an influential treatise on Byzantine art titled L'Art byzantin. In 1935 he became a member of the Académie des inscriptions et belles-lettres. Bréhier contributed many articles to the Catholic Encyclopedia.

== Selected publications ==
- l'égypte de 1798 à 1900 (1898)
- De Graecorum judiciorum origine (1899)
- Le Schisme oriental du 11^{e} siècle (1899)
- La Querelle des images (1904)
- L'Église et l'Orient au Moyen Âge : les croisades
- Articles in the Catholic Encyclopedia (1913)
- Le travail historique (1908)
- L'Auvergne (1912)
- La Cathédrale de Reims. Une œuvre française, Paris 1916
- L'art chrétien, son développement iconographique des origines à nos jours (1918)
- Les églises romanes
- L'homme dans la sculpture romane
- Études archéologiques : Le sarcophage des Carmes-Déchaux; Les anciens inventaires de la cathédrale : Le Bible historiée de Clermont
- Les survivances du rite impérial romain: à propos des rites shintoïstes (1920)
- L'Art byzantin, Paris 1924
- L'Art en France, des invasions barbares à l'époque romane, Paris 1930
- Le Monde byzantin, Paris 1947-50 (3 Volumes)
  - Volume 1: Vie et mort de Byzance
  - Volume 2: Les Institutions de l'Empire byzantin
  - Volume 3: La civilisation byzantine

=== Translation or collaboration ===
- Histoire anonyme de la première croisade, éditée et traduite par Louis Bréhier, (Anonymous history of the First Crusade, edited and translated into French by Louis Bréhier), Paris 1924.
