= James A. Brundage =

American medievalist (1929–2021)

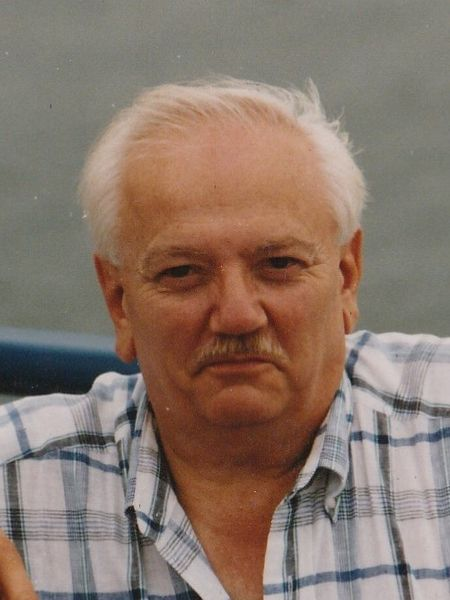

James A. Brundage (5 February 1929 – 5 November 2021) was Professor Emeritus of history and, prior to his retirement, Ahmanson-Murphy chair of medieval European history at the University of Kansas. He earned his PhD from Fordham University and was a member of the History department at the University of Wisconsin-Milwaukee before moving to Kansas. Brundage specialized in the history of medieval canon law.

In the first half of his career, Brundage studied the history of the crusades from the point of view of canon law. In later years, he turned to the study of the medieval professionalization of law. He also did scholarly work on canon law and medieval sexuality, and created a tongue-in-cheek flow-chart explaining medieval Christian sexual ethics.

== Selected publications ==
- Brundage, James A. (2008). The Medieval Origins of the Legal Profession: Canonists, Civilians, and Courts. University of Chicago Press. doi:10.7208/chicago/9780226077611.001.0001. ISBN 9780226077598.
- The Practice and Profession of Medieval Canon Law. Collected Studies Series 797. Aldershot: Ashgate, 2004. (A collection of reprinted essays).
- Co-editor, with Vern L. Bullough. Handbook of Medieval Sexuality. New York: Garland Publishing, 1996.
- Medieval Canon Law. London: Longmans, 1995.
- The Crusades, Holy War and Canon Law. Collected Studies Series 338. London: Variorum, 1991.
- Law, Sex, and Christian Society in Medieval Europe. Chicago: University of Chicago Press, 1987.
- Richard Lion Heart. New York: Scribner, 1974.
- Medieval Canon Law and the Crusader. Madison: University of Wisconsin Press, 1969.
- Editor. The Crusades, Motives and Achievements. Boston: Heath, 1964.
- The Crusades, A Documentary Survey. Milwaukee: Marquette University Press, 1962. (All the texts from this collection are now online at the Internet Medieval Sourcebook: Crusades.)
