= Flora and fauna of Greenland =

Plants and wildlife in Greenland

Although the bulk of its area is covered by ice caps inhospitable to most forms of life, Greenland's terrain and waters support a wide variety of plant and animal species. The northeastern part of the island is the world's largest national park. The flora and fauna of Greenland are strongly susceptible to changes associated with climate change.

The image galleries below link to information related to the flora and fauna of Greenland, including Latin taxonomy, Danish translations, and links to articles in the Danish Wikipedia, which can be helpful when searching for more information.

== Flora ==
310 species of vascular plants were said to be found in Greenland in 2019, including 15 endemic species. Although individual plants can be profuse in favourable situations, relatively few plant species tend to be represented in a given place.

In northern Greenland, the ground is covered with a carpet of mosses and low-lying shrubs such as dwarf willows and crowberries. Flowering plants in the north include yellow poppy, Pedicularis, and Pyrola. Plant life in southern Greenland is more abundant, and certain plants, such as the dwarf birch and willow, may grow several feet high.

The only natural forest in Greenland is found in the Qinngua Valley. The forest consists mainly of downy birch (Betula pubescens) and grey-leaf willow (Salix glauca), growing up to 7–8 metres (23–26 ft) tall, although nine stands of conifers had been cultivated elsewhere by 2007.

Horticulture shows a certain degree of success. Plants such as broccoli, radishes, spinach, leeks, lettuce, turnips, chervil, potatoes and parsley are grown up to considerable latitudes, while the very south of the country also rears asters, Nemophila, mignonette, rhubarb, sorrel and carrots. Over the decade to 2007, the growing season lengthened by as much as three weeks.

In the 13th-century Konungs skuggsjá (King's mirror), it is stated that the old Norsemen tried in vain to raise barley. Recent research from archaeological digs on Greenland by the National Museum in Copenhagen discovered barley grains and concluded that the Vikings were able to grow barley.

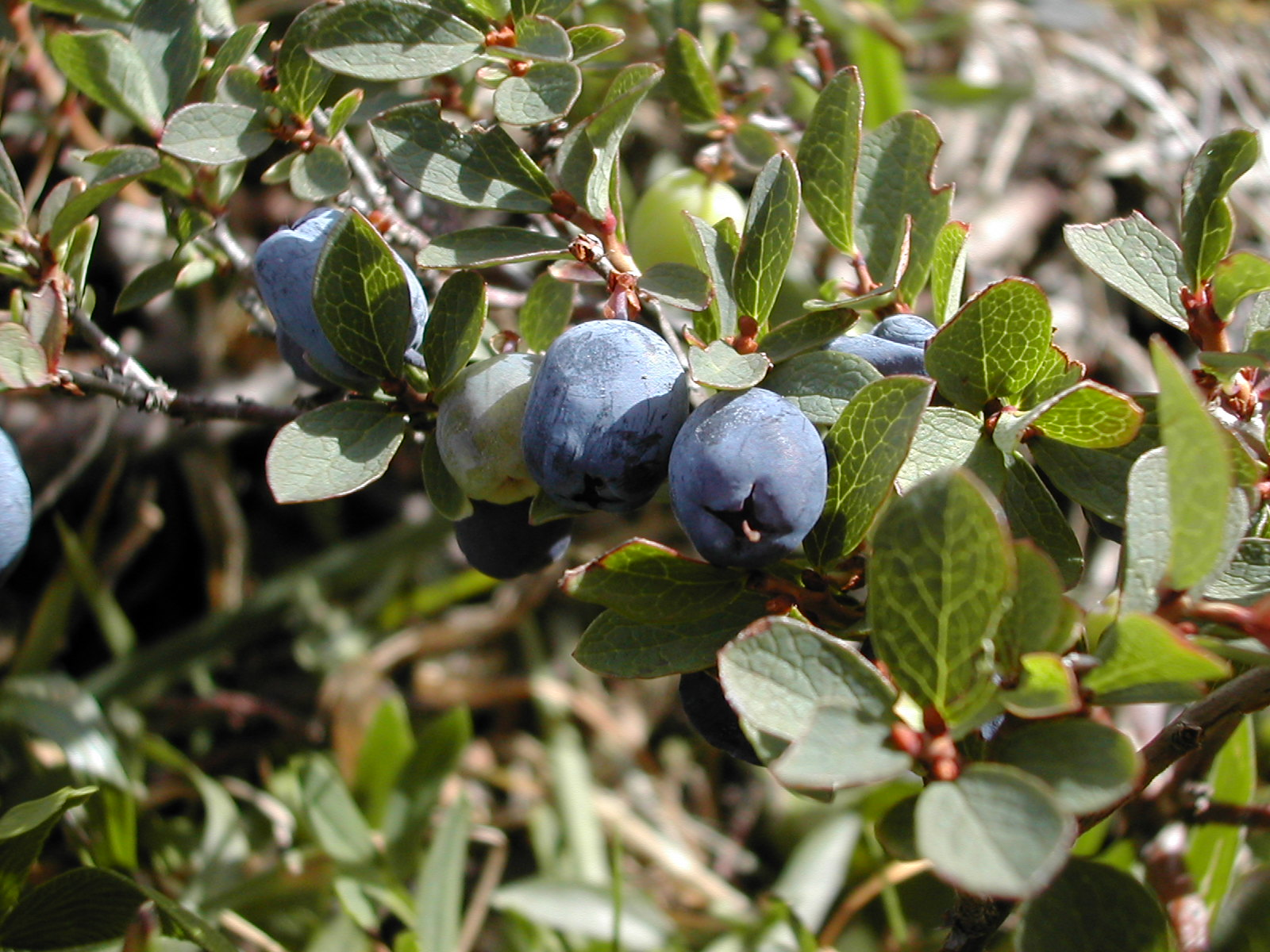
Bog Bilberry (Arctic Blueberry)
Vaccinium uliginosum
Kigutaarnat nagguii / mosebølle / blåbær
Kigutaarnat, Blåbær

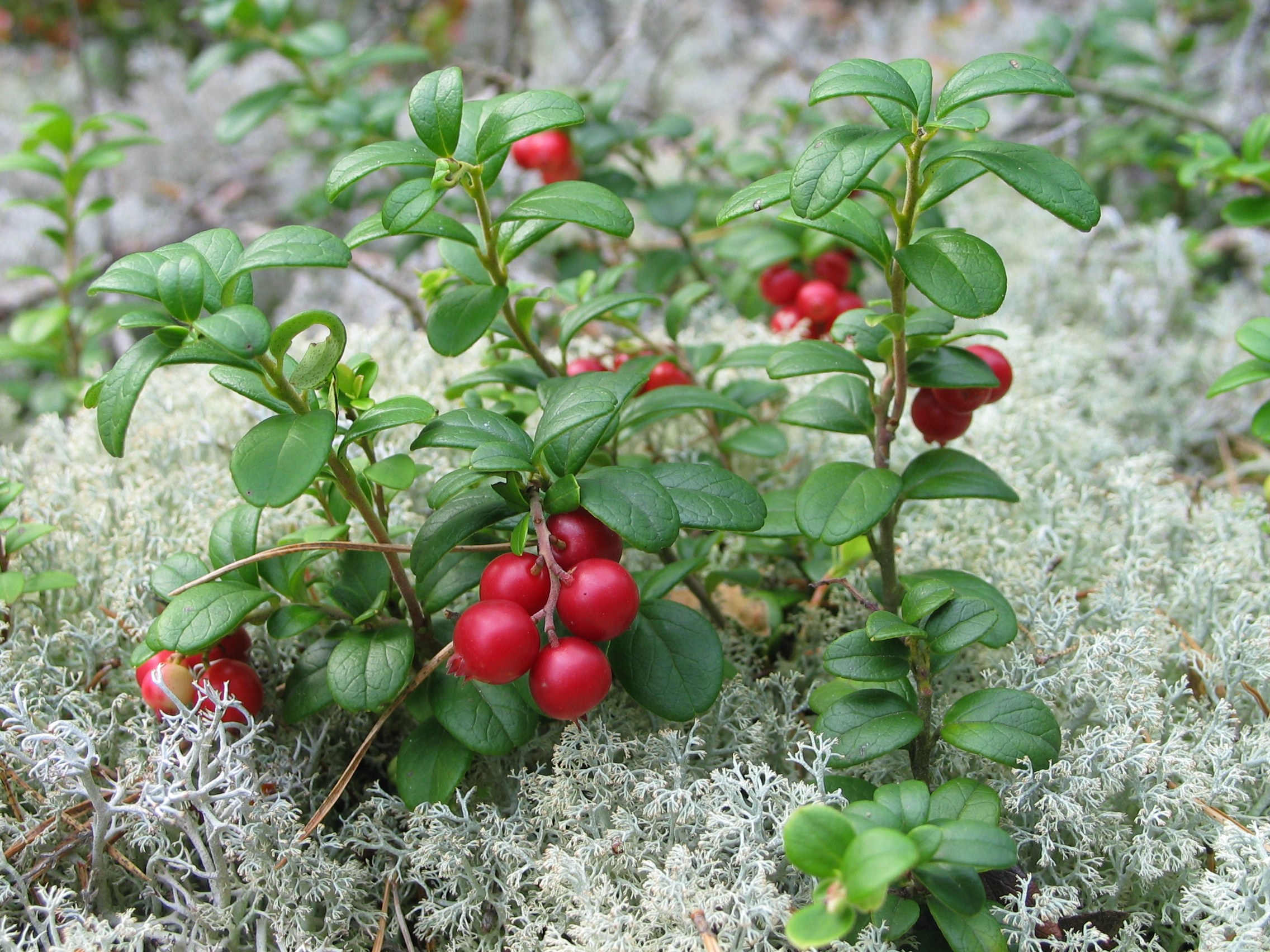
Cowberry
Vaccinium vitis-idaea
kimmernat / tyttebær
Kimmernat, Tyttebær

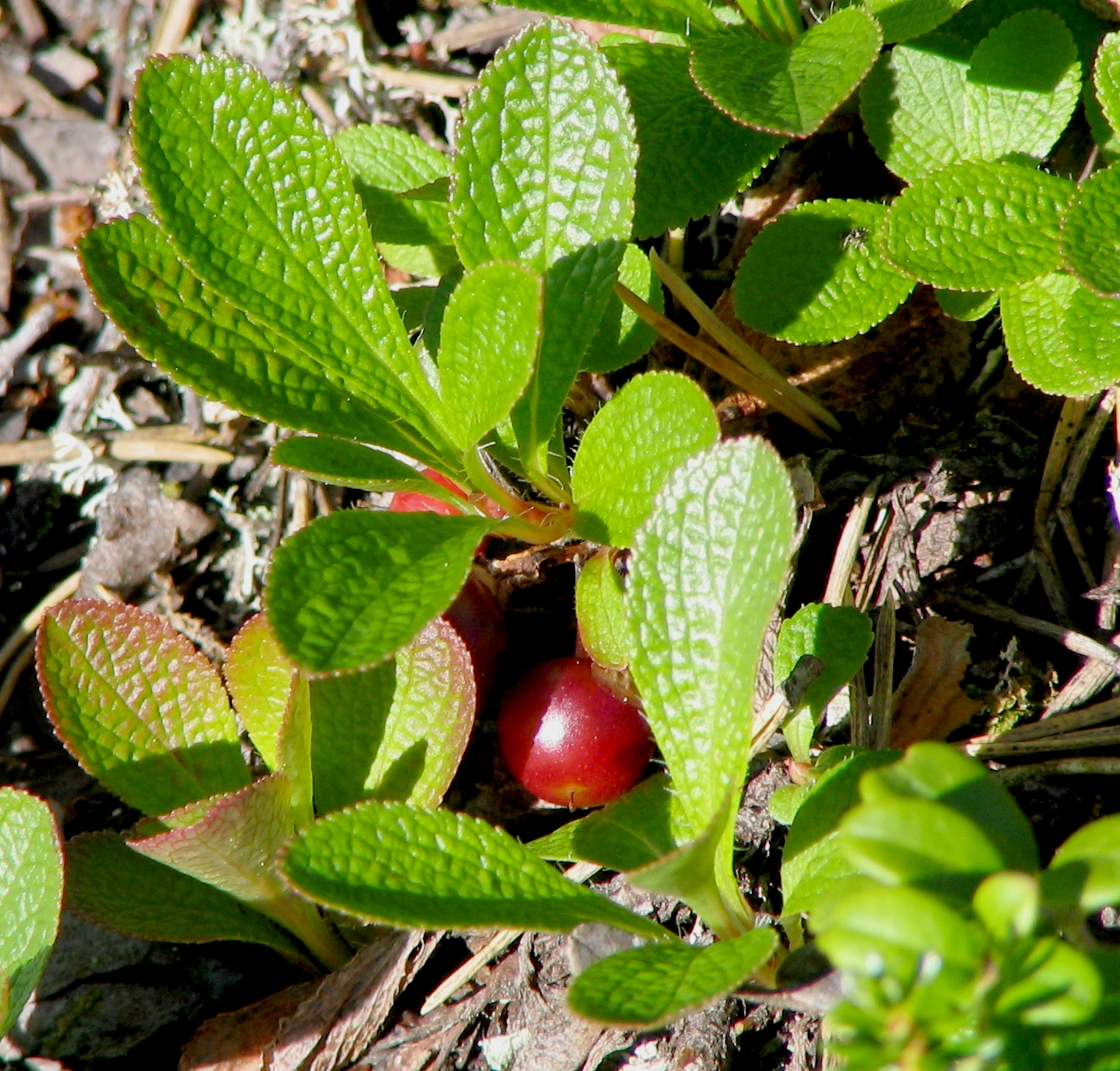
Alpine bearberry
Arctostaphylos alpina
bjerg melbærris
Melbærris

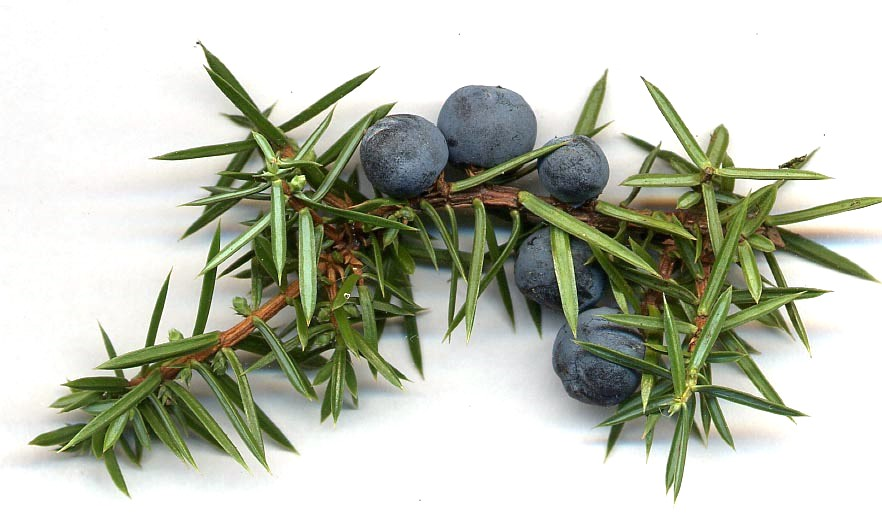
Juniper berry
Alpine Juniper
enebær
Kakillarnaq; Paarnaqulluk, Enebær

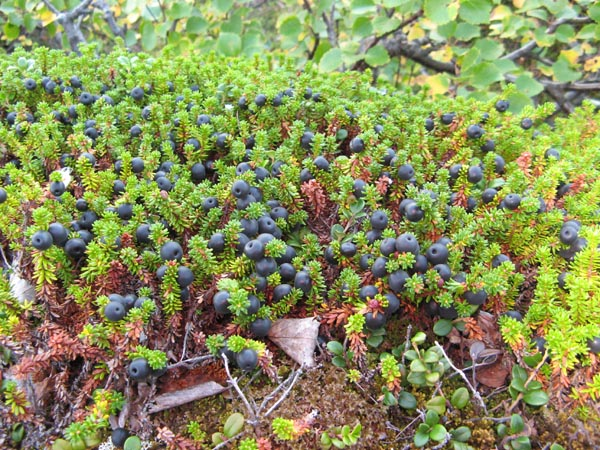
Crowberry
Empetrum hermaphroditum
paarnat / sortebær / revling
Paarnat, Almindelig Revling

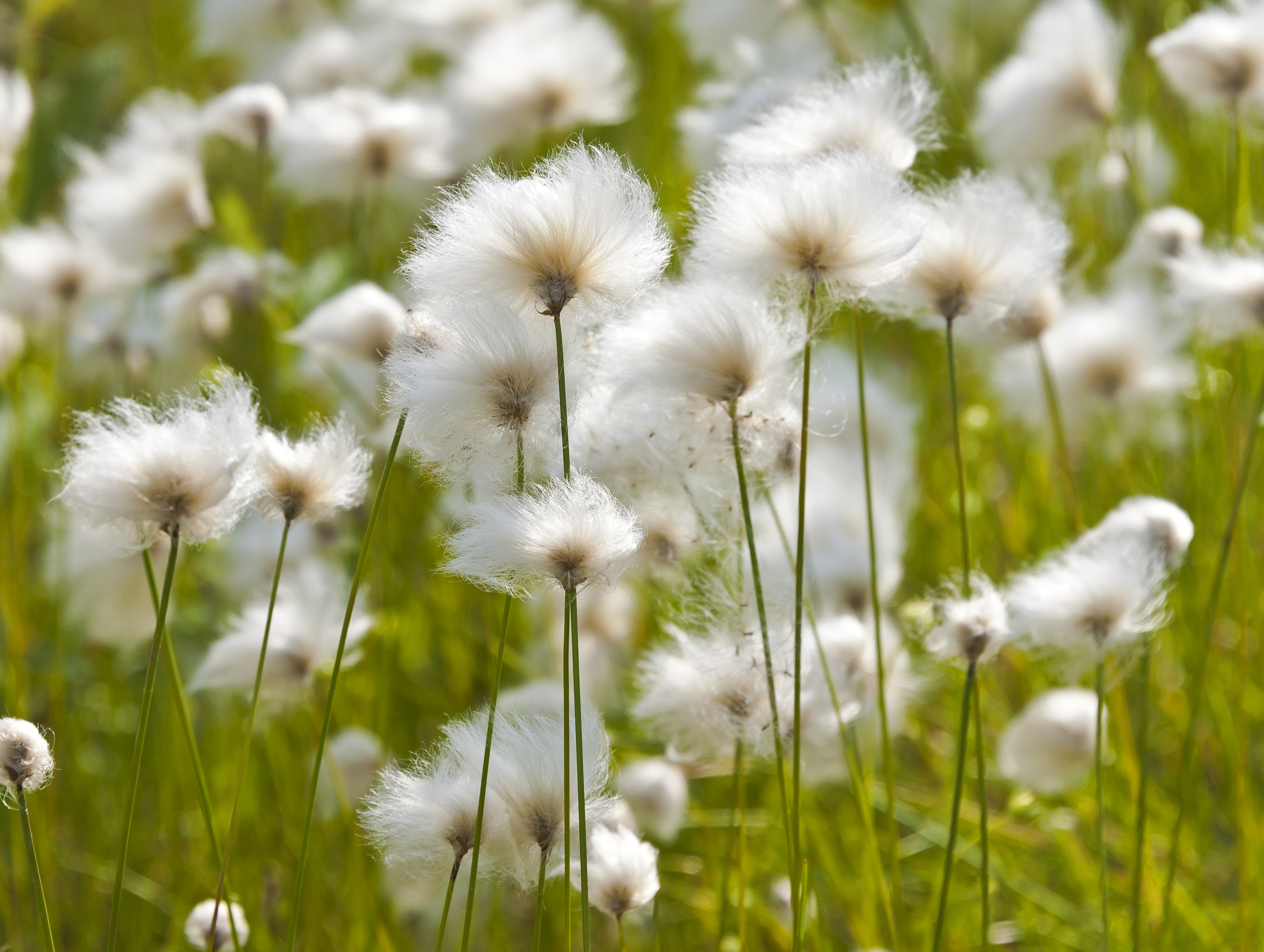
Arctic Cottongrass
Eriophorum scheuchzeri
ukaliusaq / polar kæruld
Ukaliusaq, Kæruld

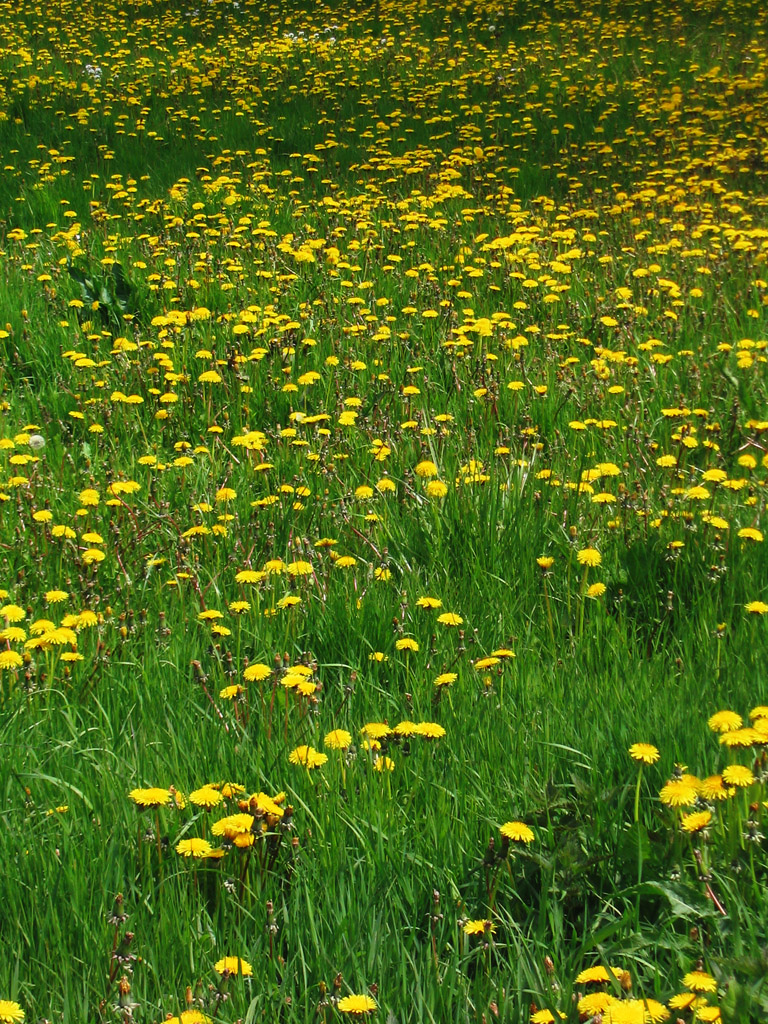
Dandelion
Taraxacum lacerum
inneruulaq / asorut / seqiniusaq / mælkebøtte
Inneruulaq; Asorut; Seqiniusaq, Mælkebøtte

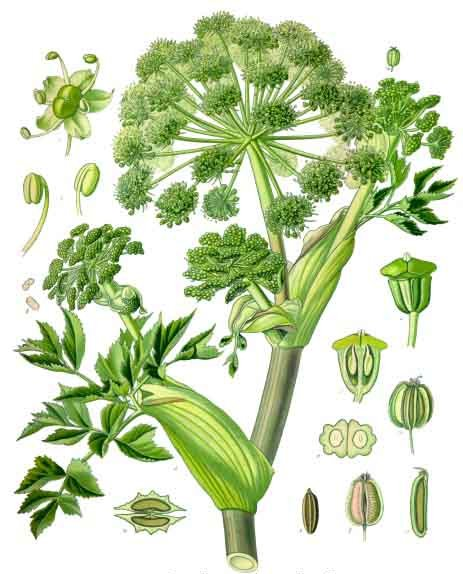
Garden angelica
Angelica archangelica
kuanneq / kvan
Kuanneq, Kvan

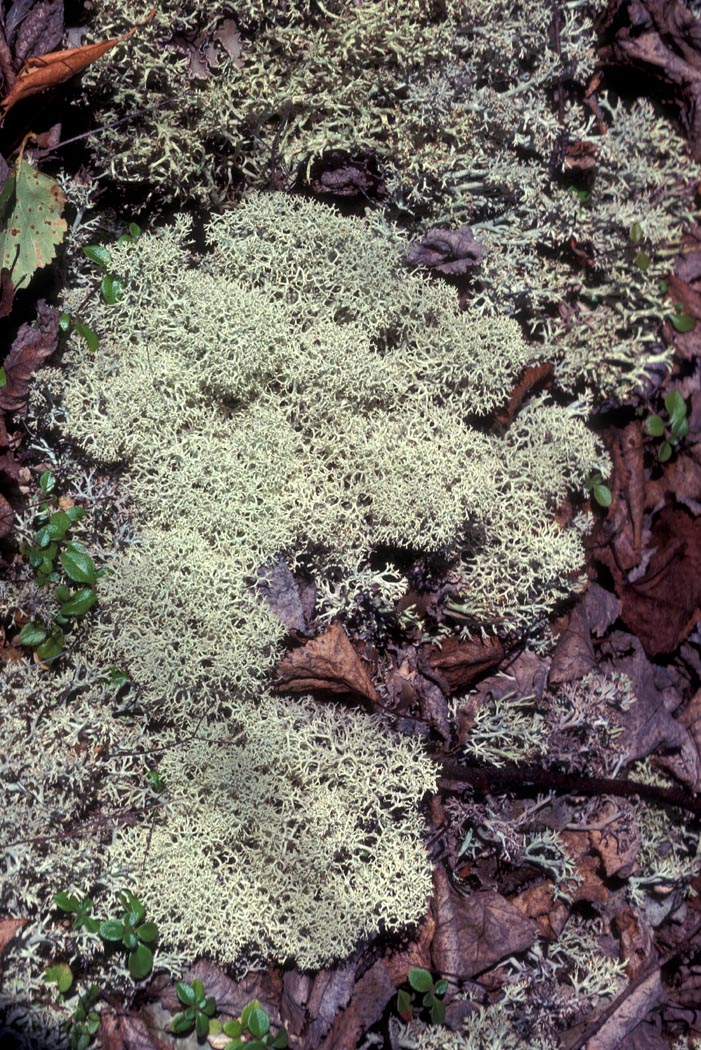
Boreal cup lichen
Cladonia borealis Stenroos
orsuaasat ermusingasut /rensdyrlav
Orsuaasat ermusingasut, Bægerlav-familien

== Fauna ==
=== Land mammals ===
Among the large land mammals are the musk ox, the caribou, the polar bear and the white Greenland wolf. Other familiar mammals in Greenland include the Arctic hare, collared lemming, Beringian ermine and Arctic fox. Reindeer hunting is of considerable cultural importance to the people of Greenland.

Domesticated land mammals include dogs, which were introduced by the Inuit, as well as such European-introduced species as goats, Greenlandic sheep, oxen and pigs, which are raised in modest numbers in the south.

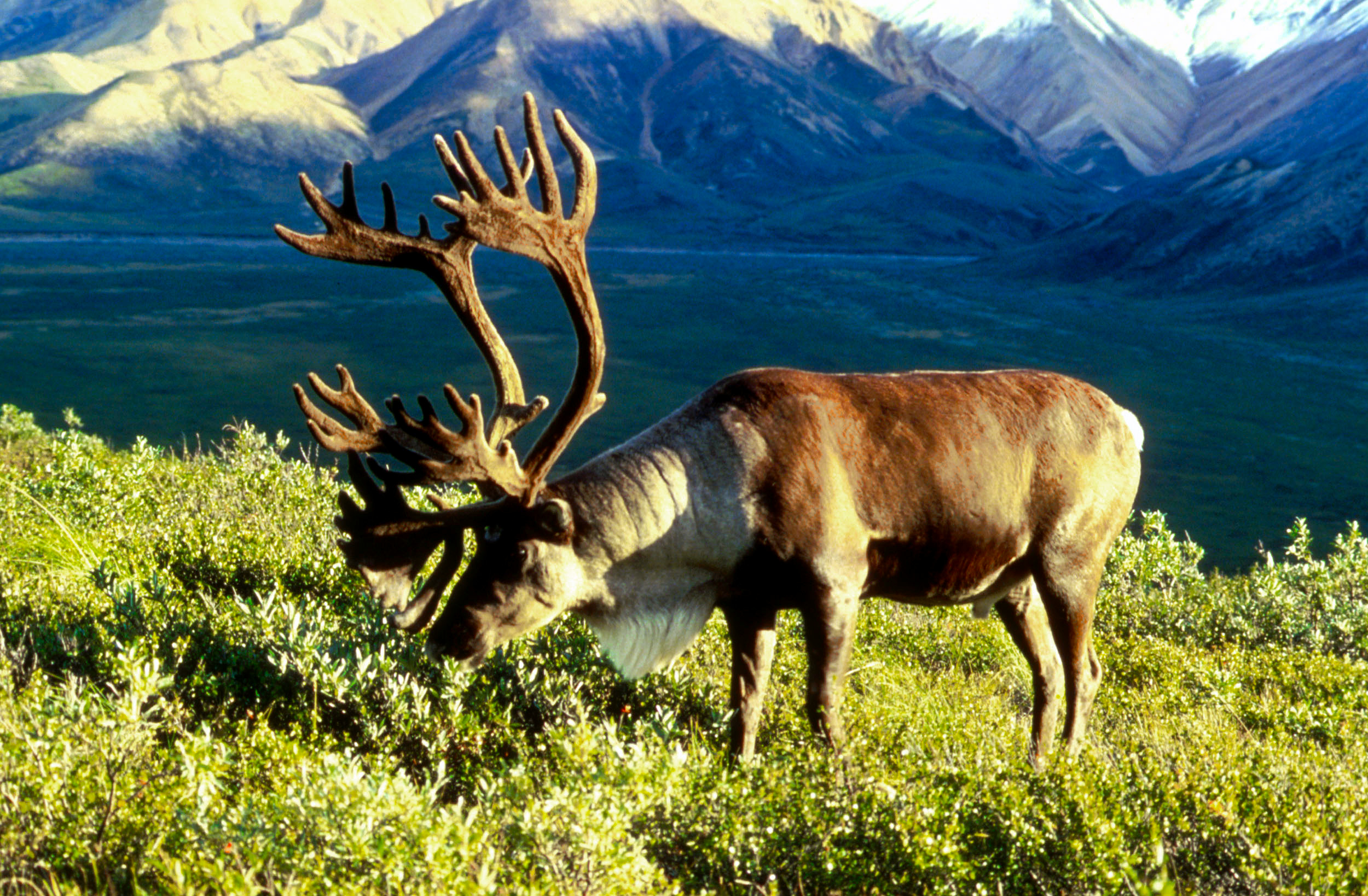
Barren-ground caribou
Rangifer tarandus groenlandicus
rensdyr / ren / karibu

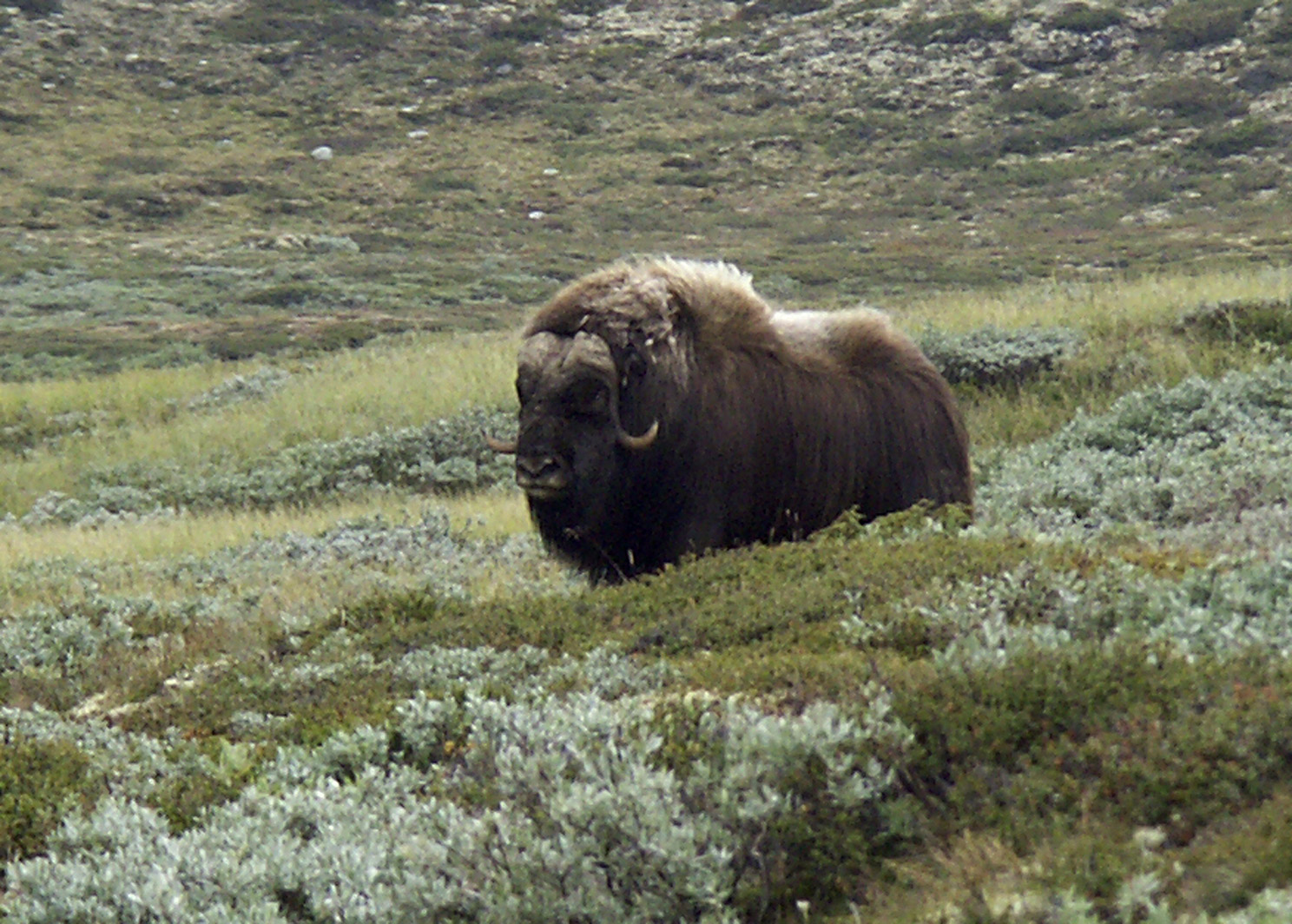
Muskox
Ovibos moschatus
moskusokse

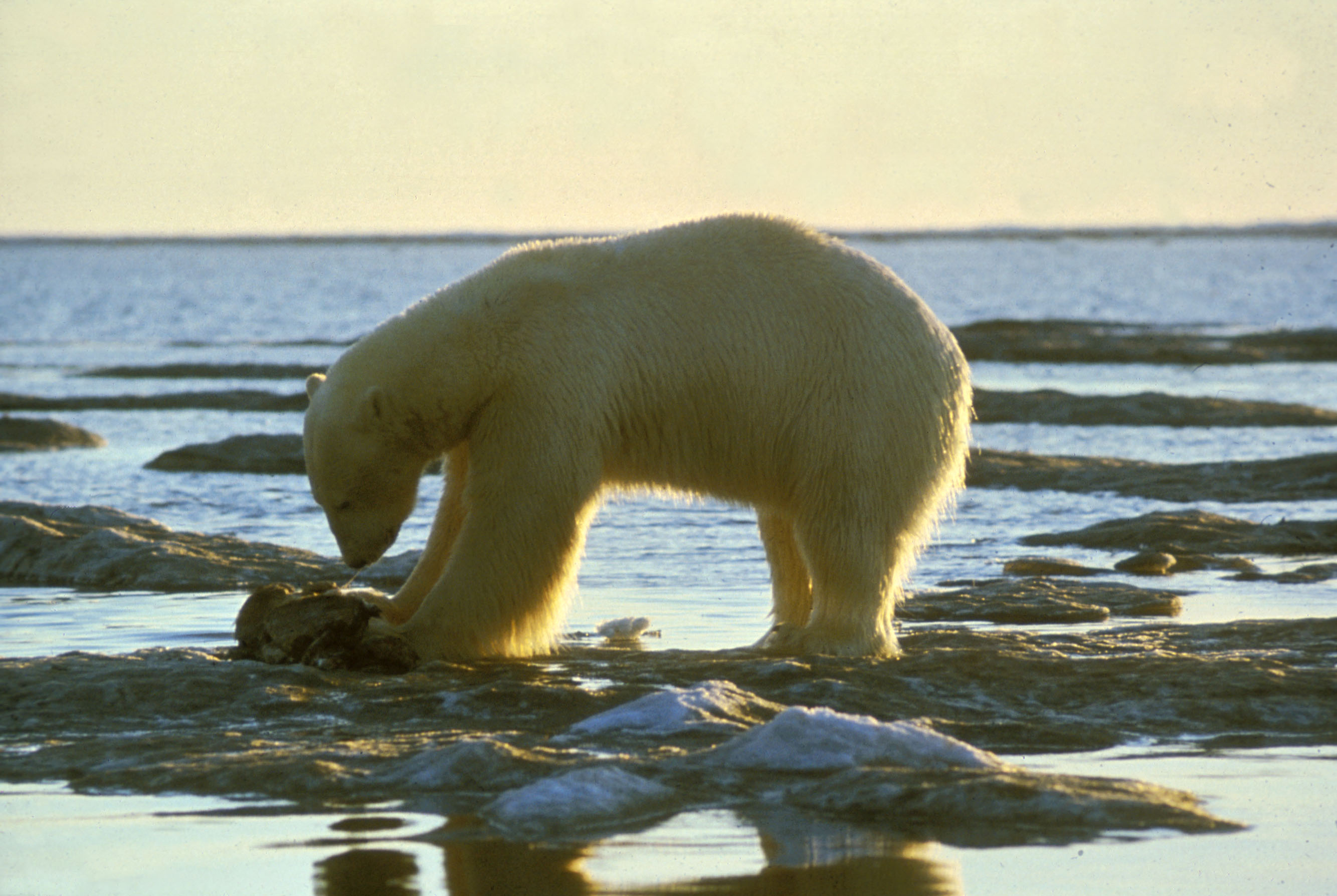
Polar bear
Ursus maritimus
isbjørn

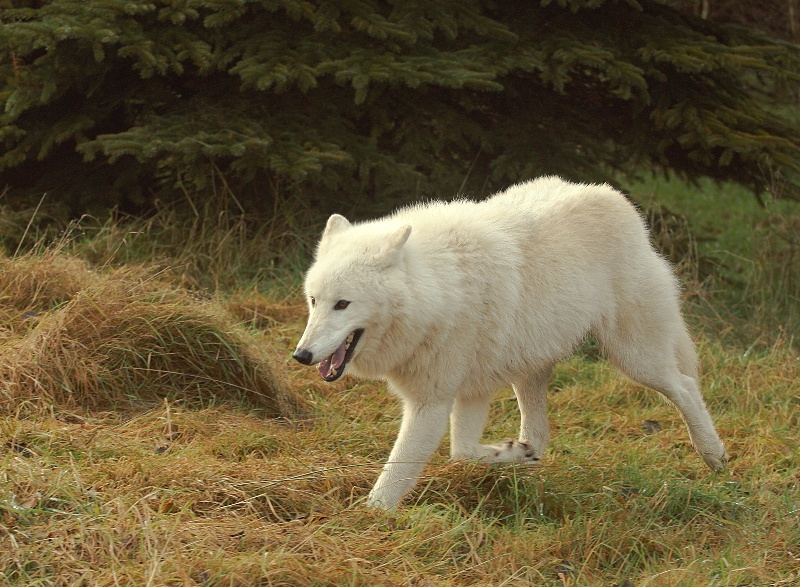
Greenland wolf
Canis lupus orion
grønland ulv

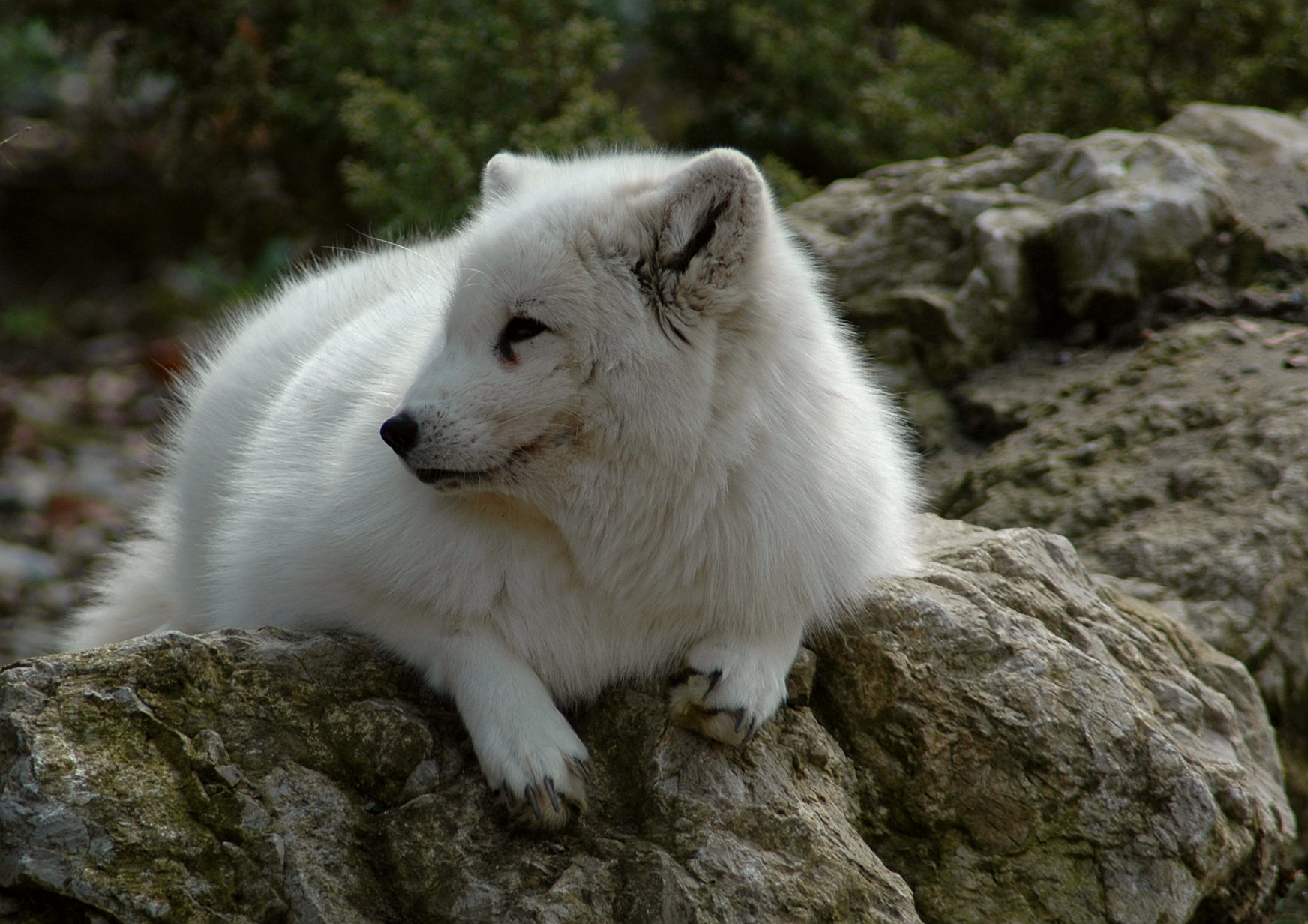
Greenland Arctic fox
Vulpes lagopus foragorapusis
polarræv

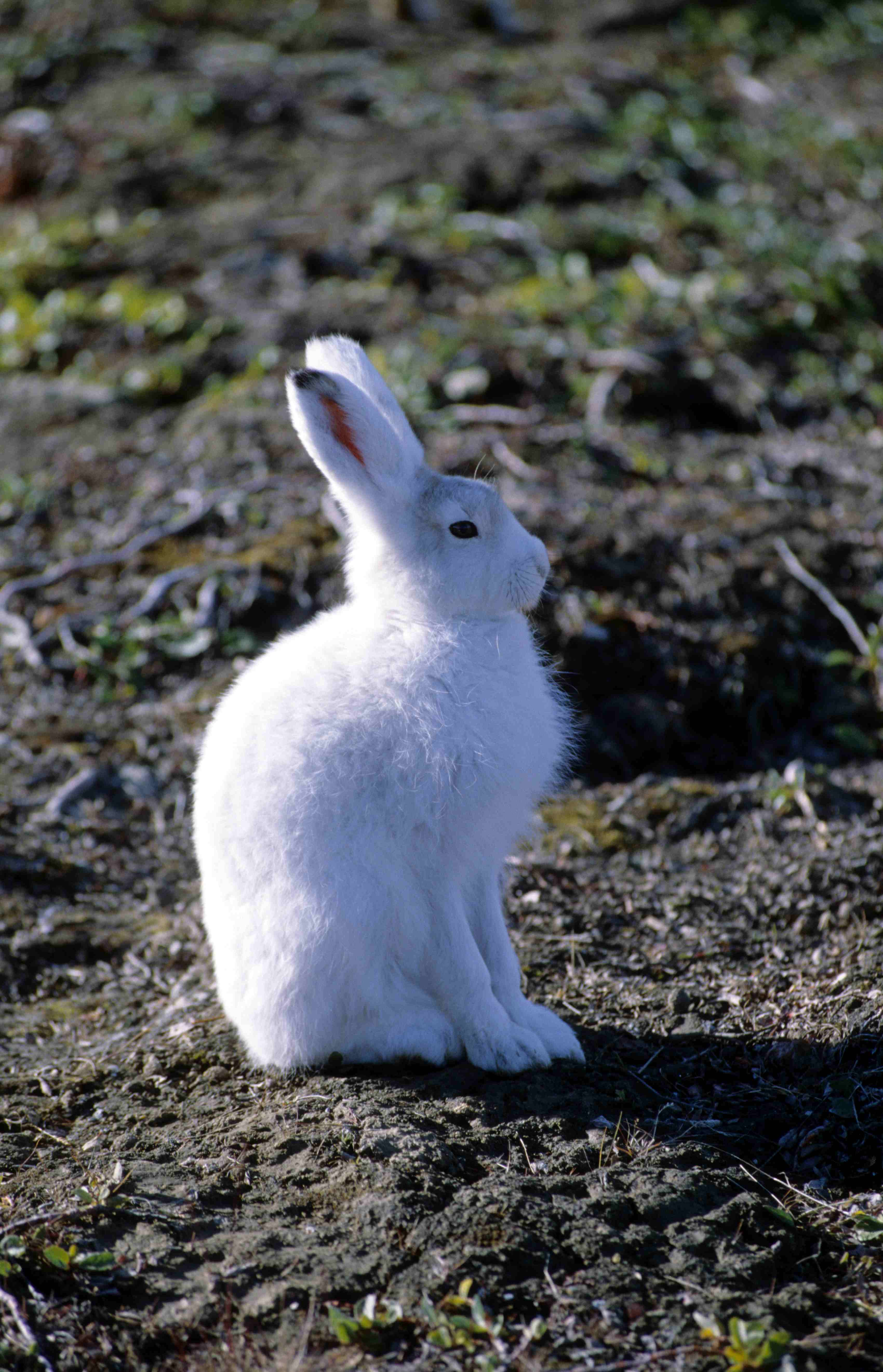
Greenland Arctic hare
Lepus arcticus groenlandicus
snehare

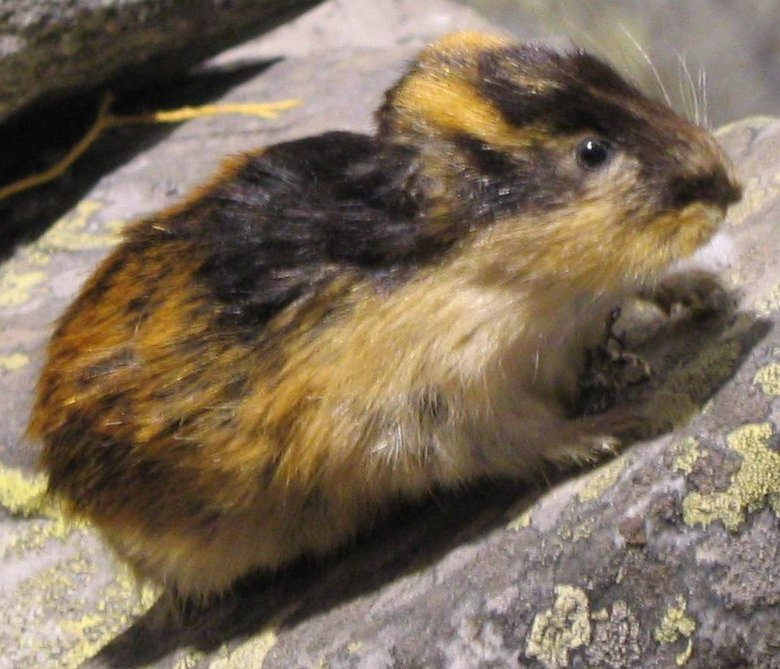
Northern collared lemming
Dicrostonyx groenlandicus
lemming

=== Marine mammals ===
As many as two million seals are estimated to inhabit Greenland's coasts; species include the hooded seal (Cystophora cristata) as well as the grey seal (Halichoerus grypus). Whales frequently pass very close to Greenlandic shores in the late summer and early autumn. Species represented include the beluga whale, blue whale, Greenland whale, fin whale, humpback whale, minke whale, narwhal, pilot whale, sperm whale. Whaling was formerly a major industry in Greenland; by the turn of the 20th century, however, the right whale population was so depleted that the industry was in deep decline. Walruses are to be found primarily in the north and east of the country; like narwhal, they have at times suffered from overhunting for their tusks.

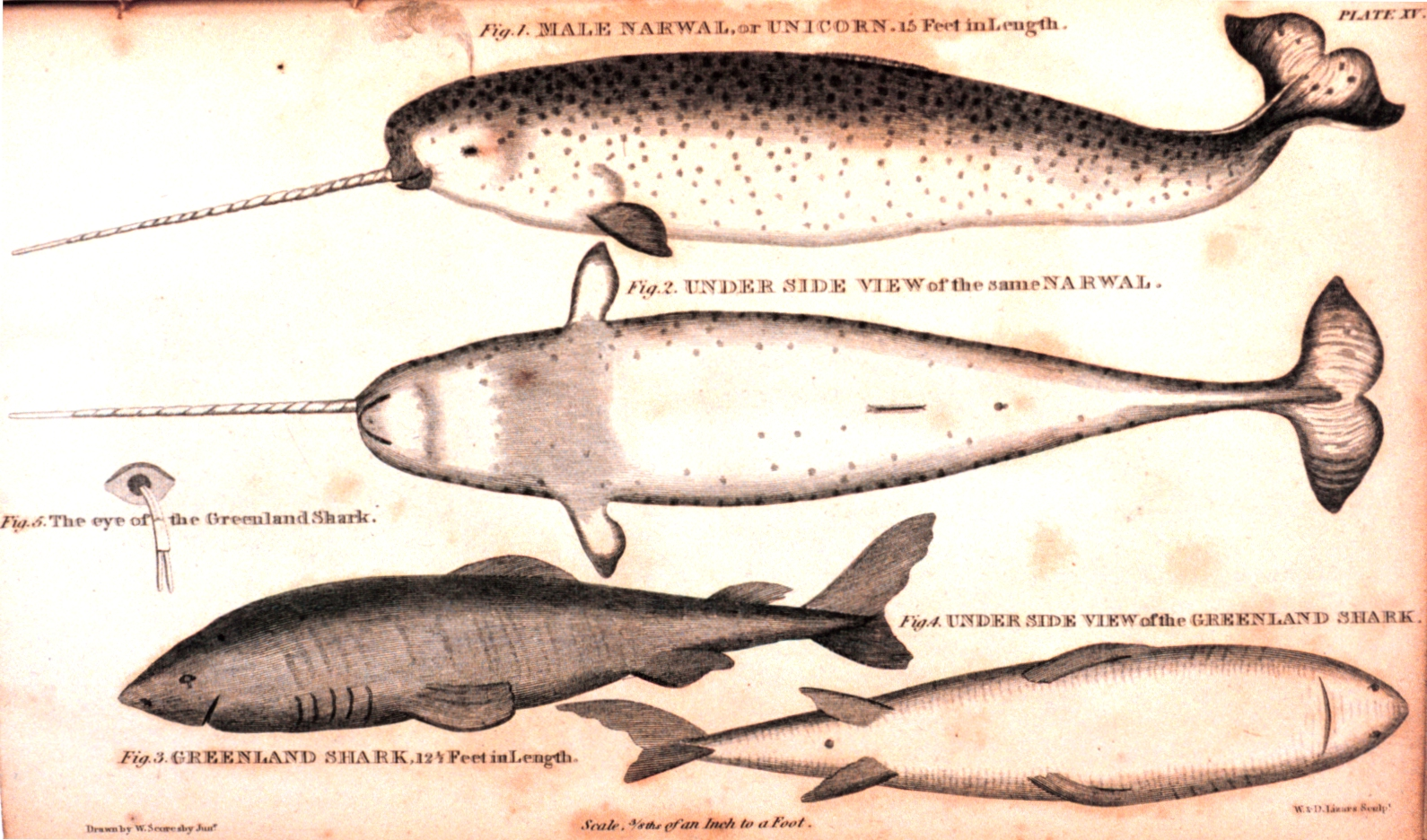
Narwhal
Monodon monoceros
narhval

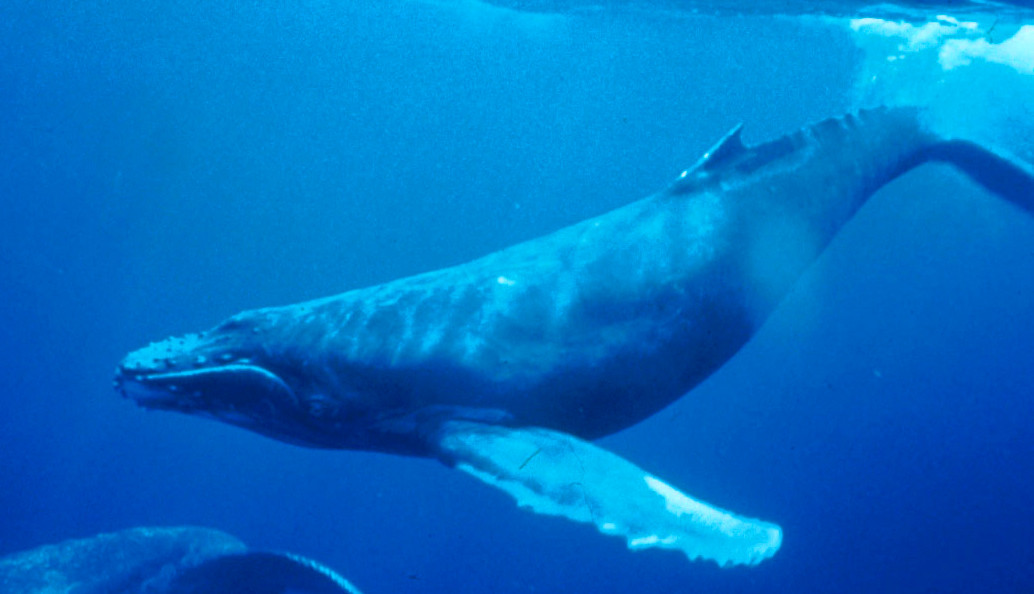
Humpback whale
Megaptera novaeangliae
pukkelhval

Orca
Orcinus orca
spækhugger

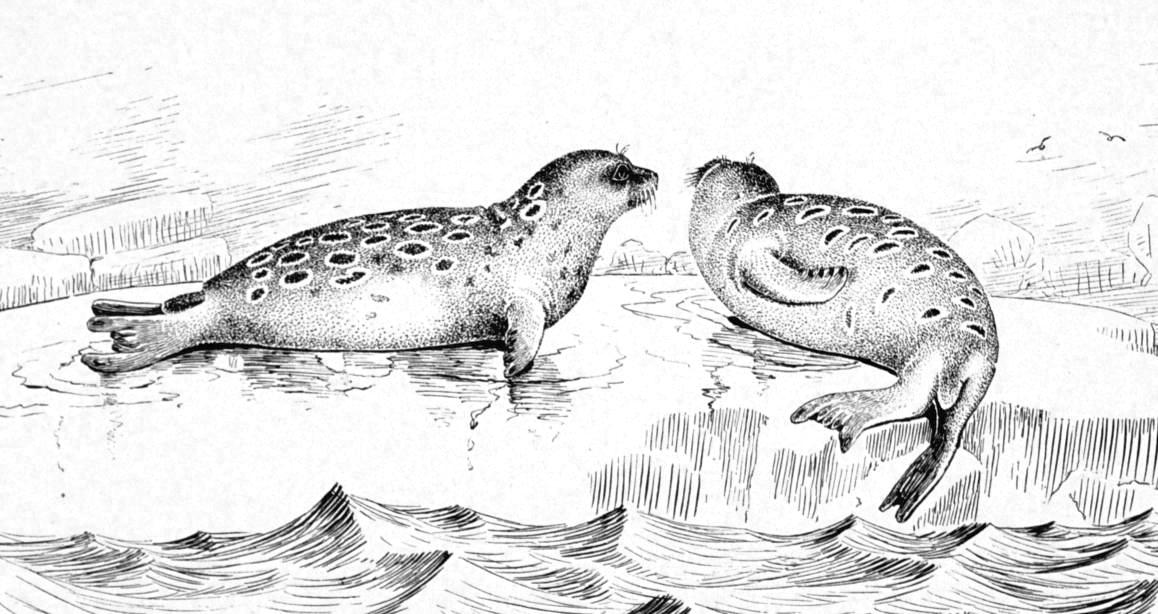
Ringed seal
Phoca hispida
ringsæl

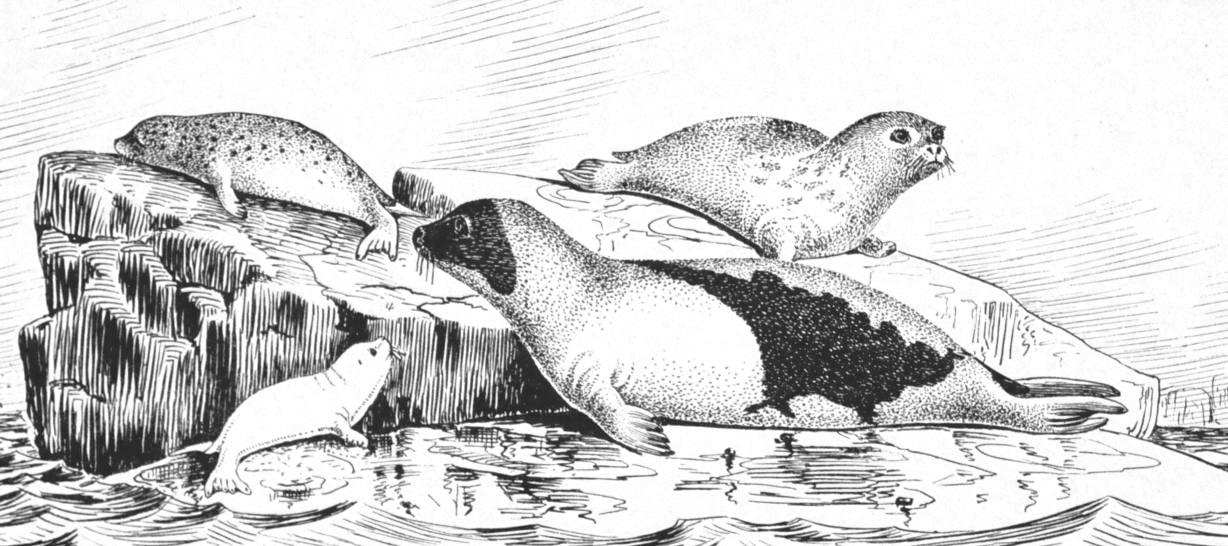
Harp seal
Phoca groenlandica
grønlandssæl

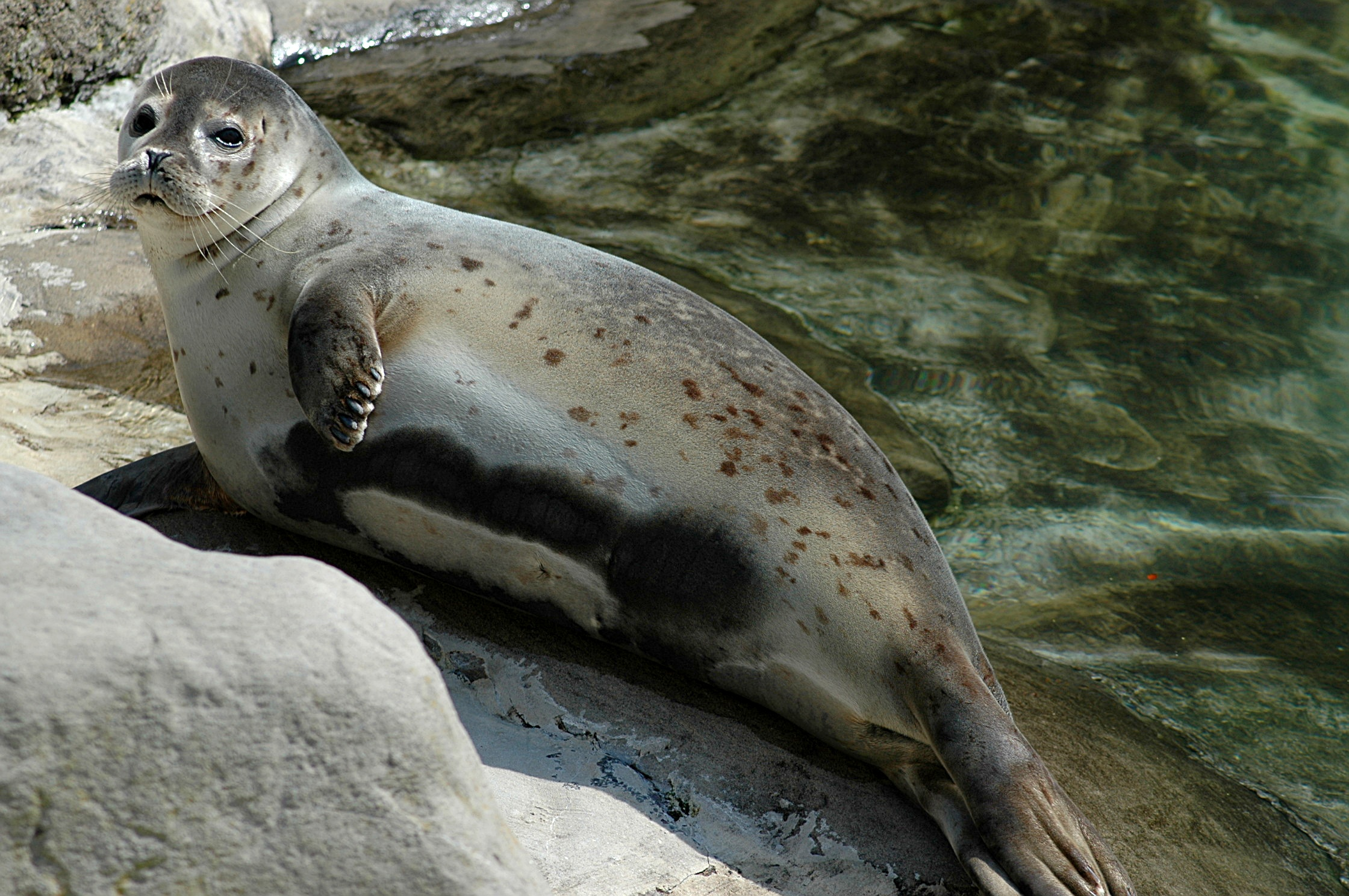
Common seal
Phoca vitulina
spættet sæl

=== Birds ===
As of 1911, 61 species of birds were known to breed in Greenland. Certain birds such as the eider duck, guillemot and ptarmigan are often hunted for food in the winter.

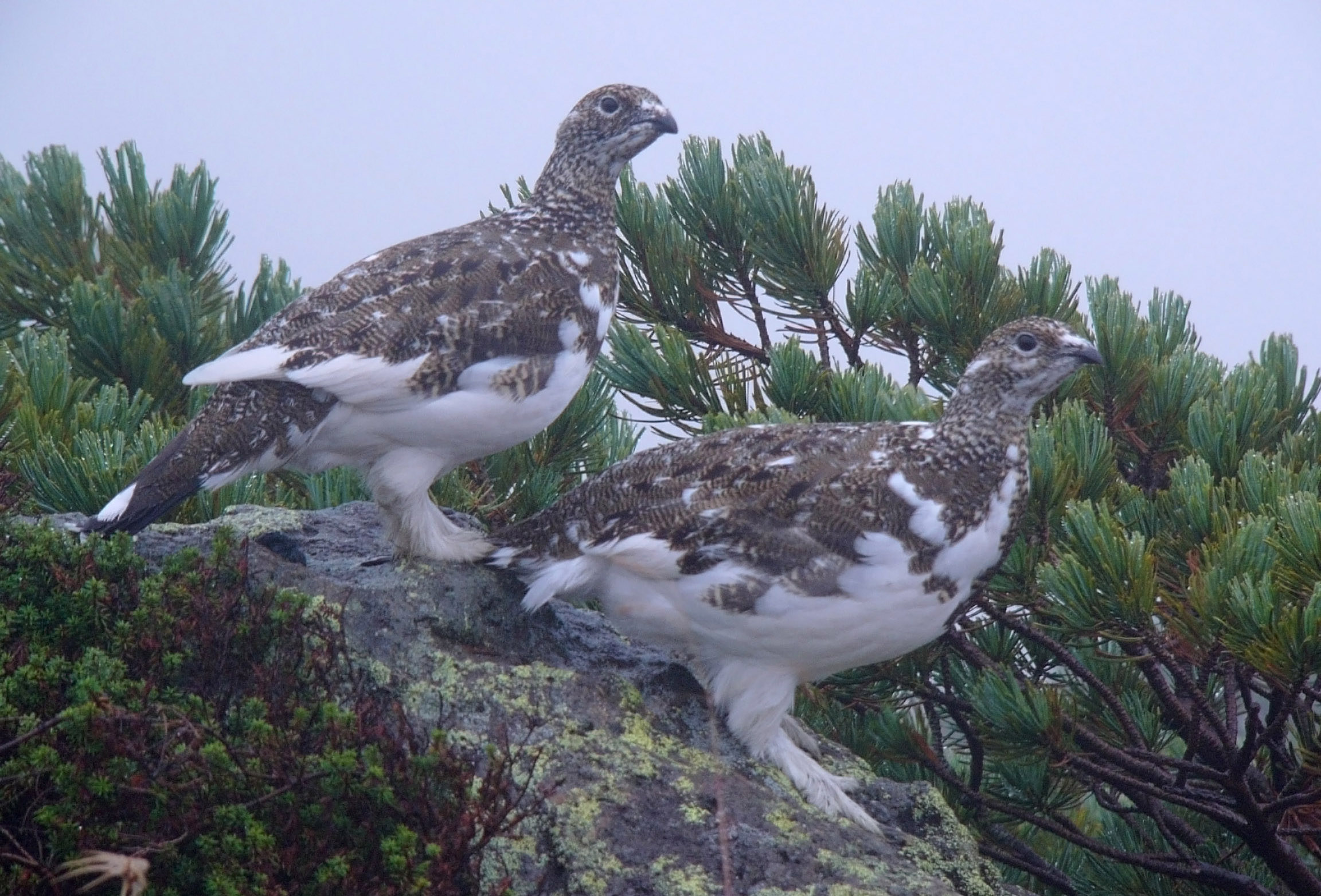
Rock ptarmigan
Lagopus muta
rype
Skovhøns

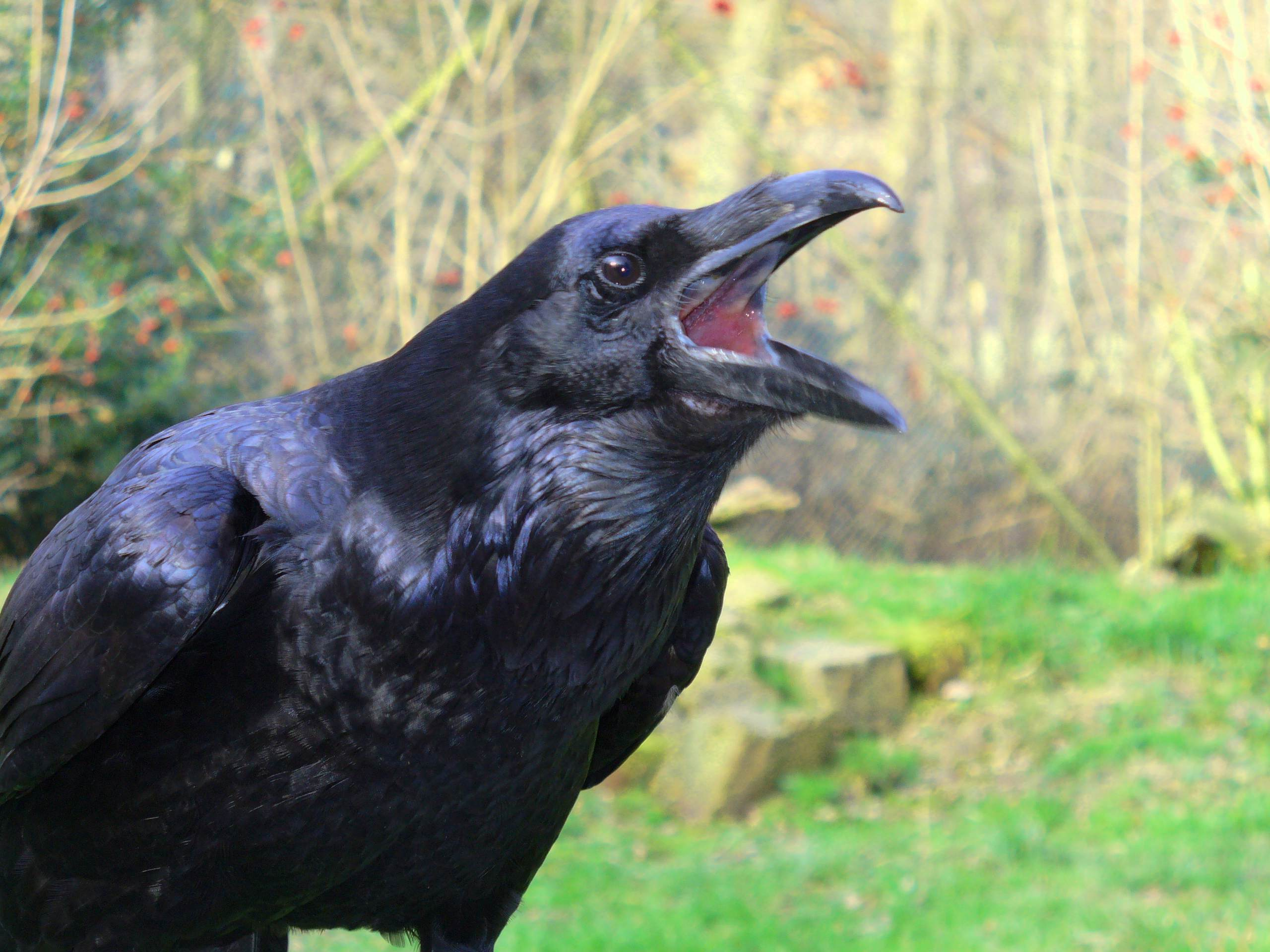
Raven
Corvus corax
ravn

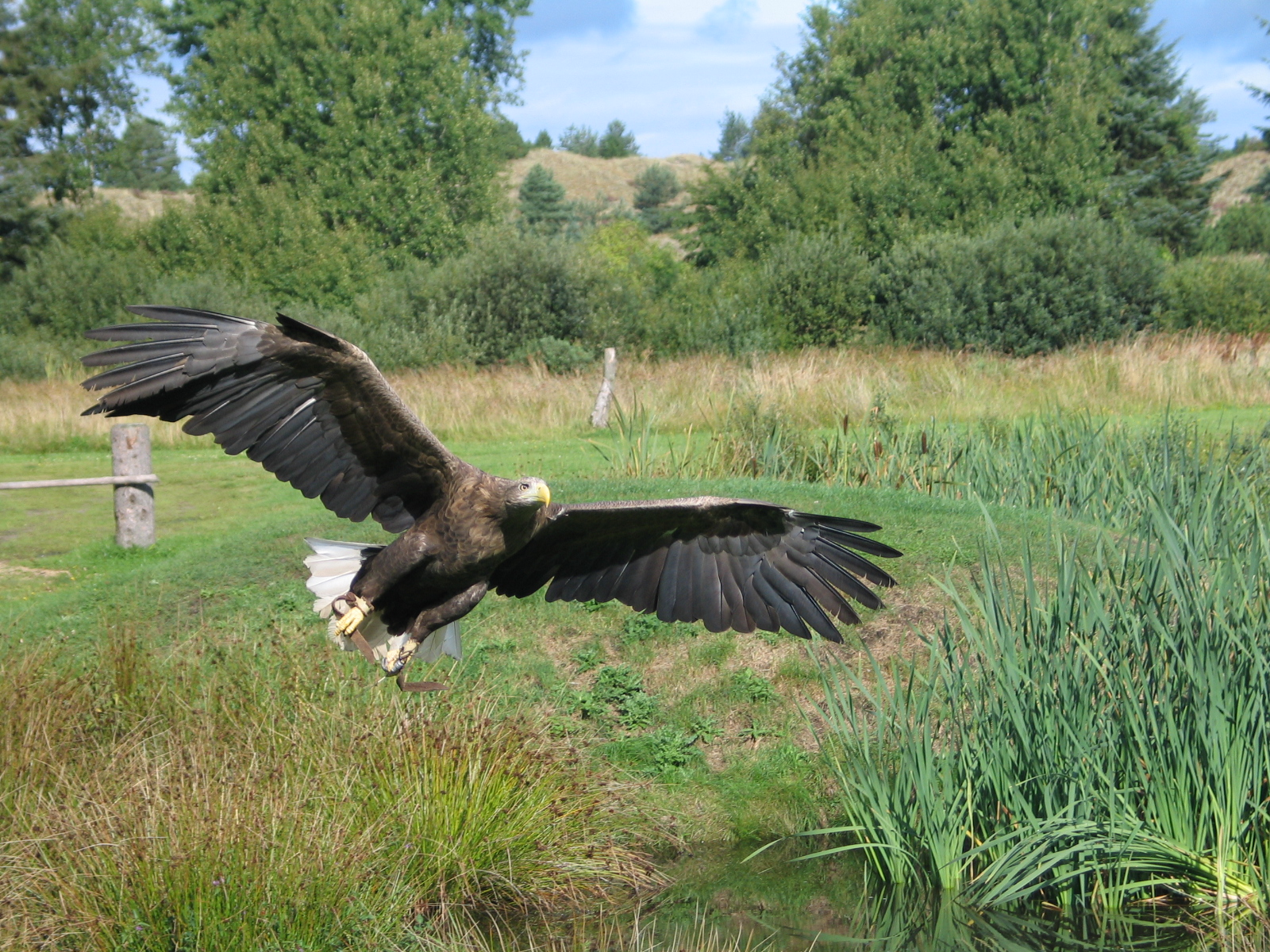
White-tailed sea eagle
Haliaeetus albicilla
havørn

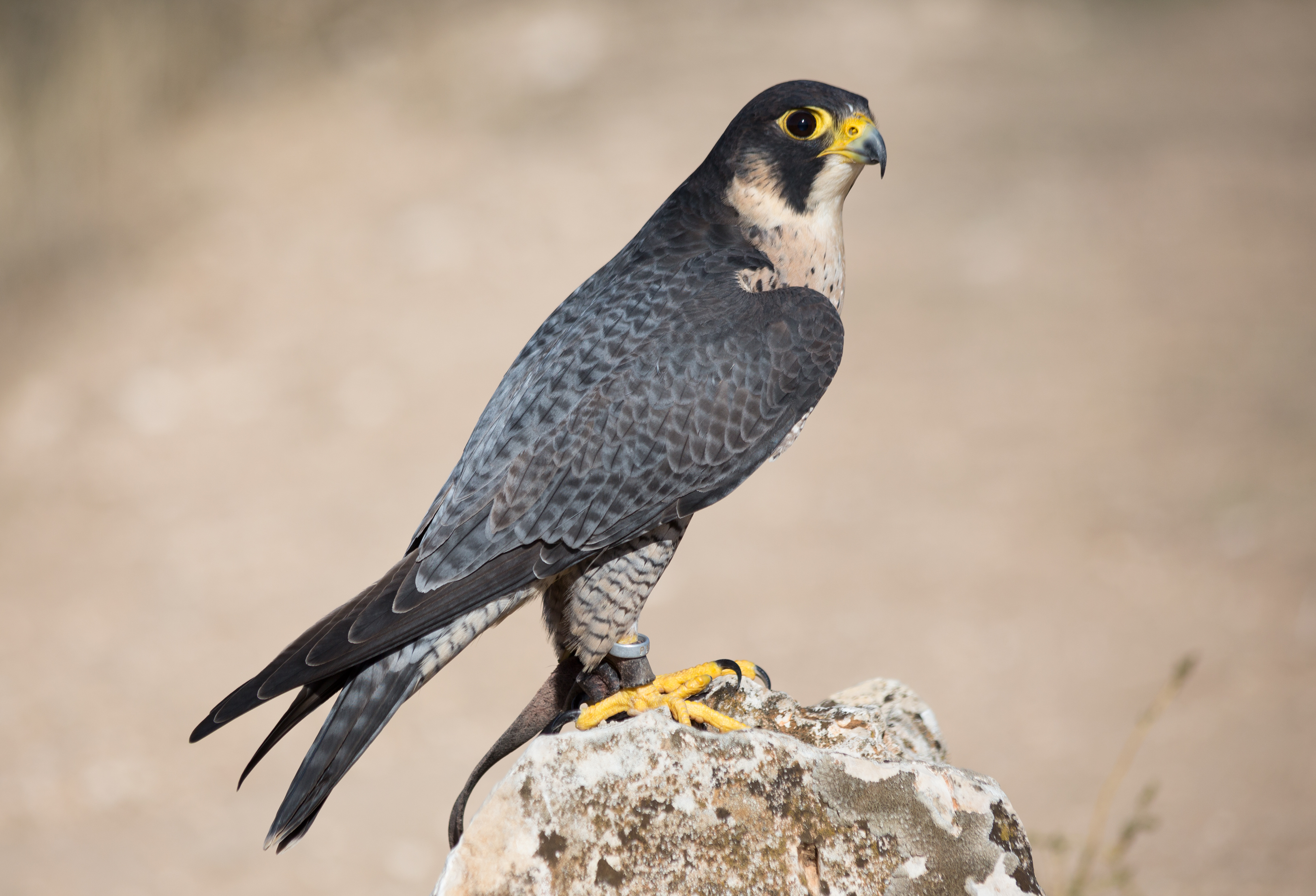
Peregrine falcon
Falco peregrinus
vandrefalk

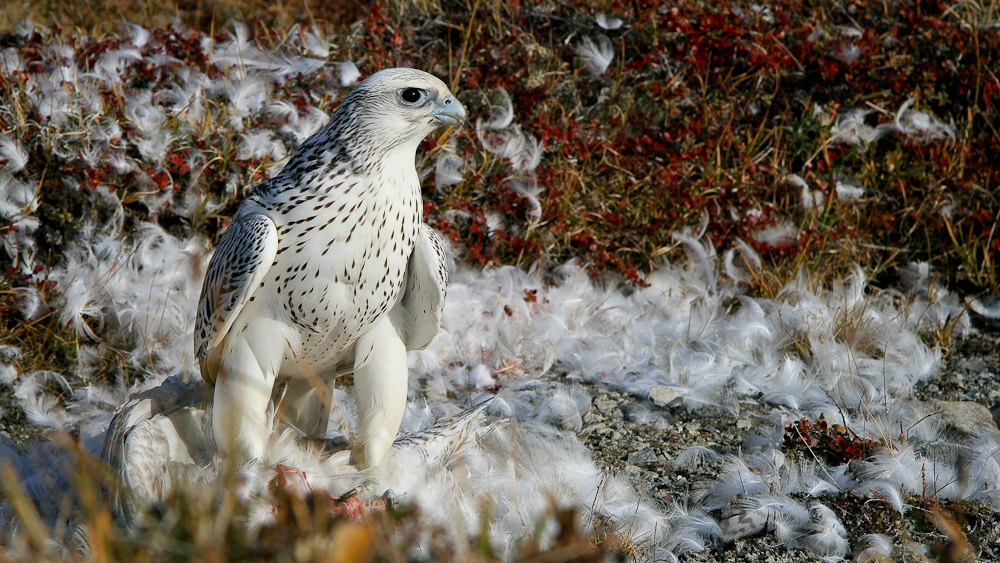
Gyrfalcon
Falco rusticolus
jagtfalk

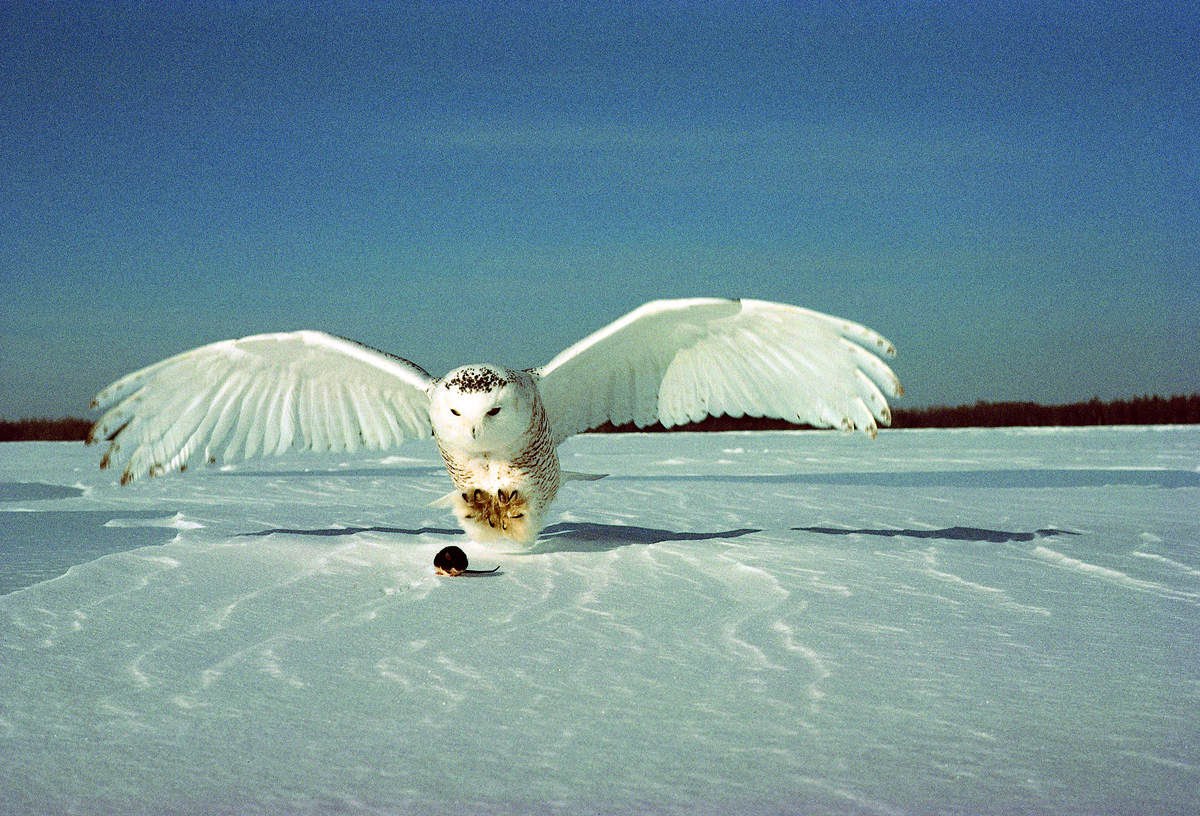
Snowy owl
Bubo scandiacus
sneugle

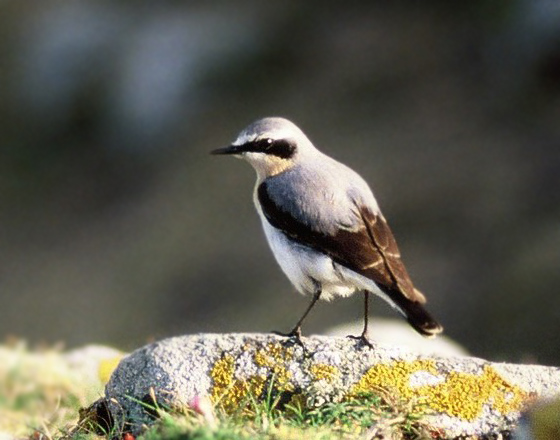
Northern wheatear
Oenanthe oenanthe
stenpikker

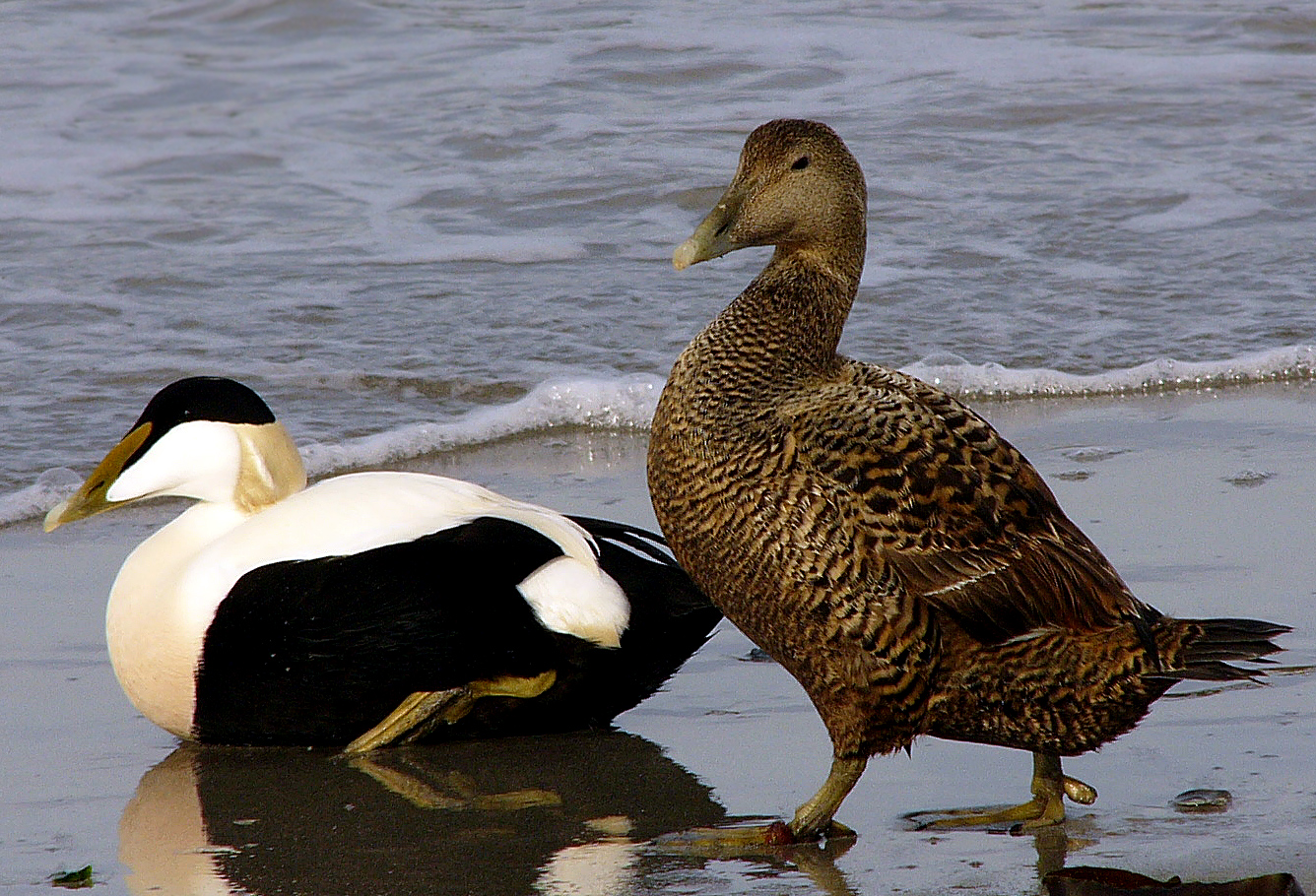
Common eider
Somateria mollissima
ederfugl

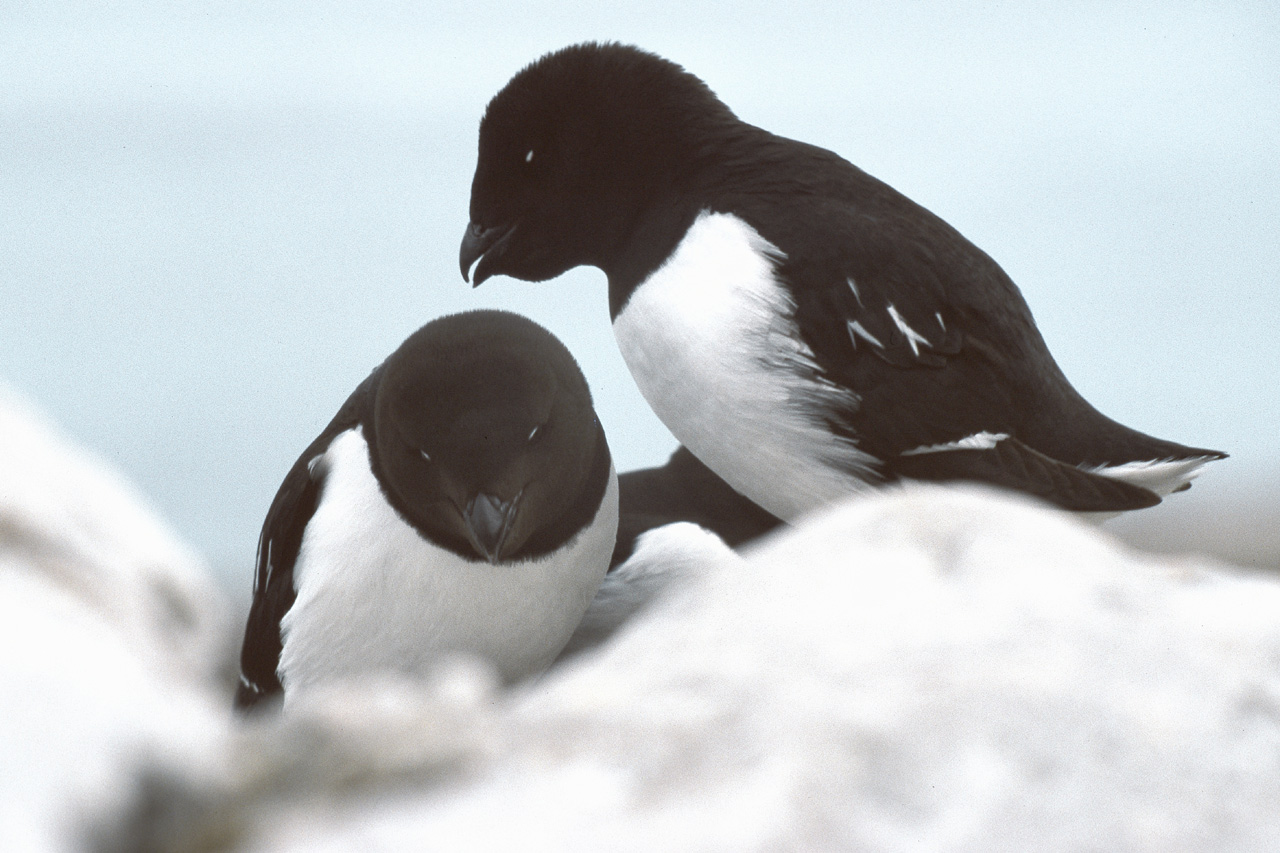
Little auk
Alle alle
søkonge

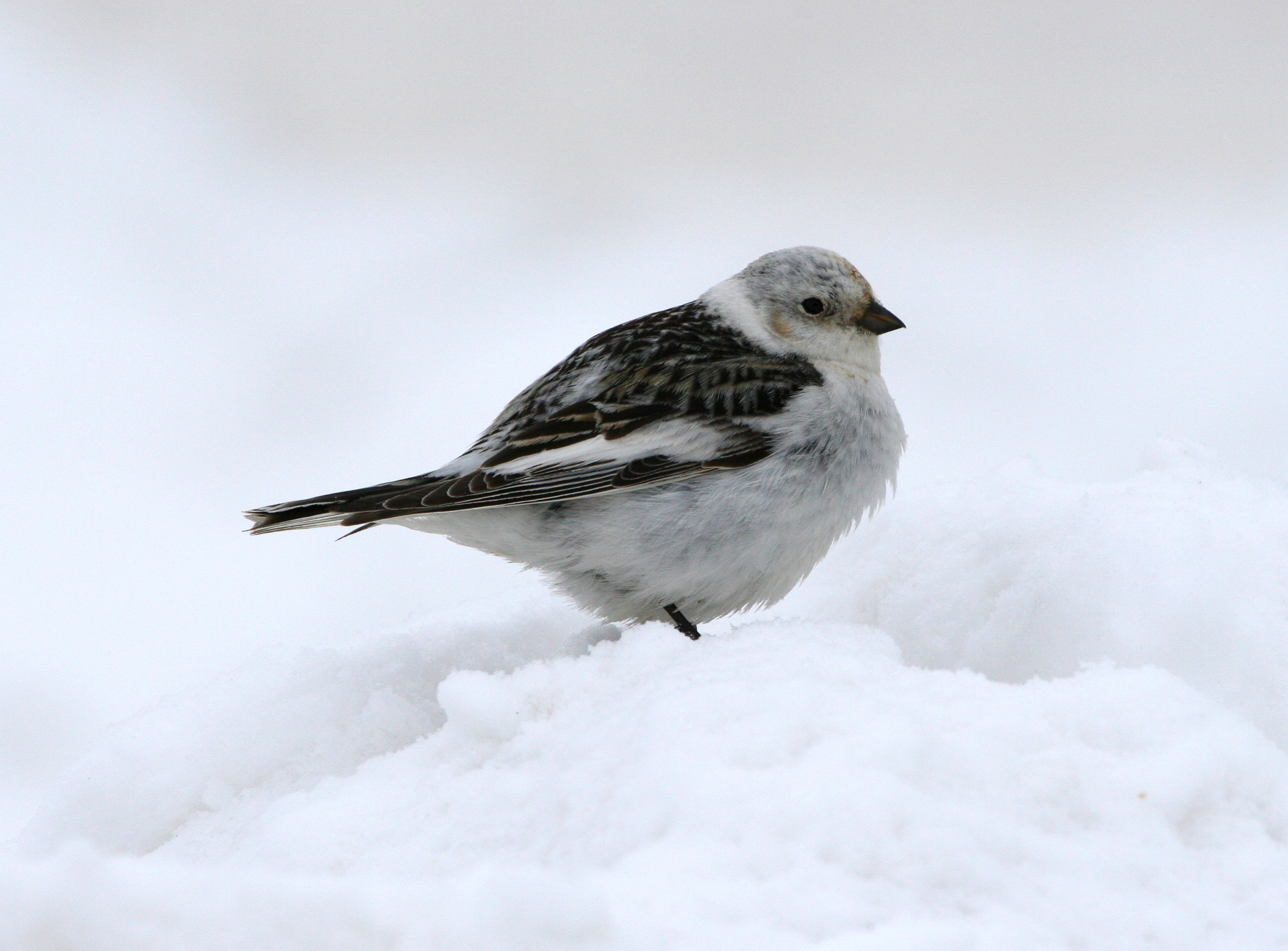
Snow bunting
Plectrophenax nivalis
snespurv

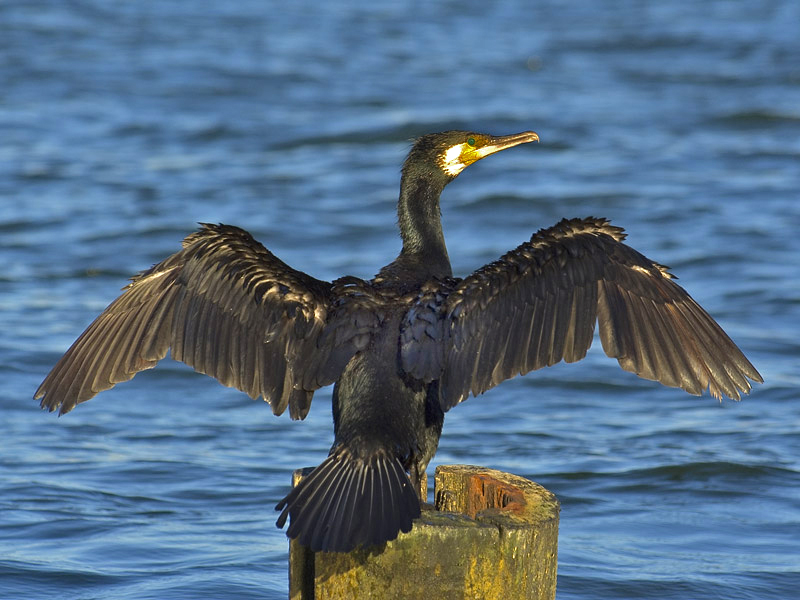
Great cormorant
Phalacrocorax carbo
skarv

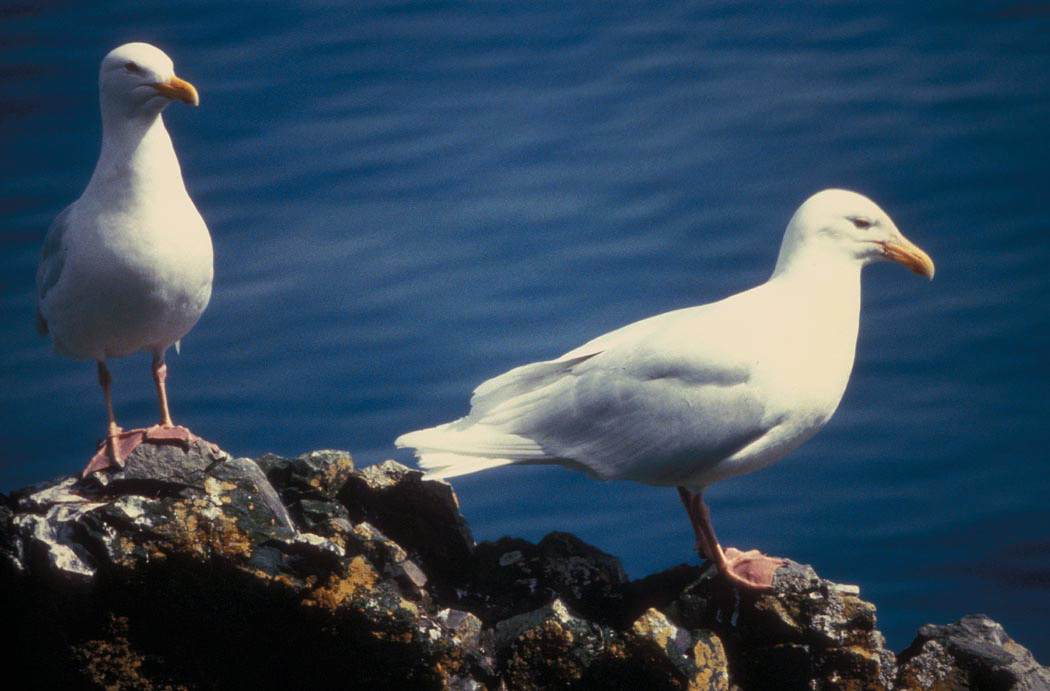
Glaucous gull
Larus hyperboreus
gråmåge

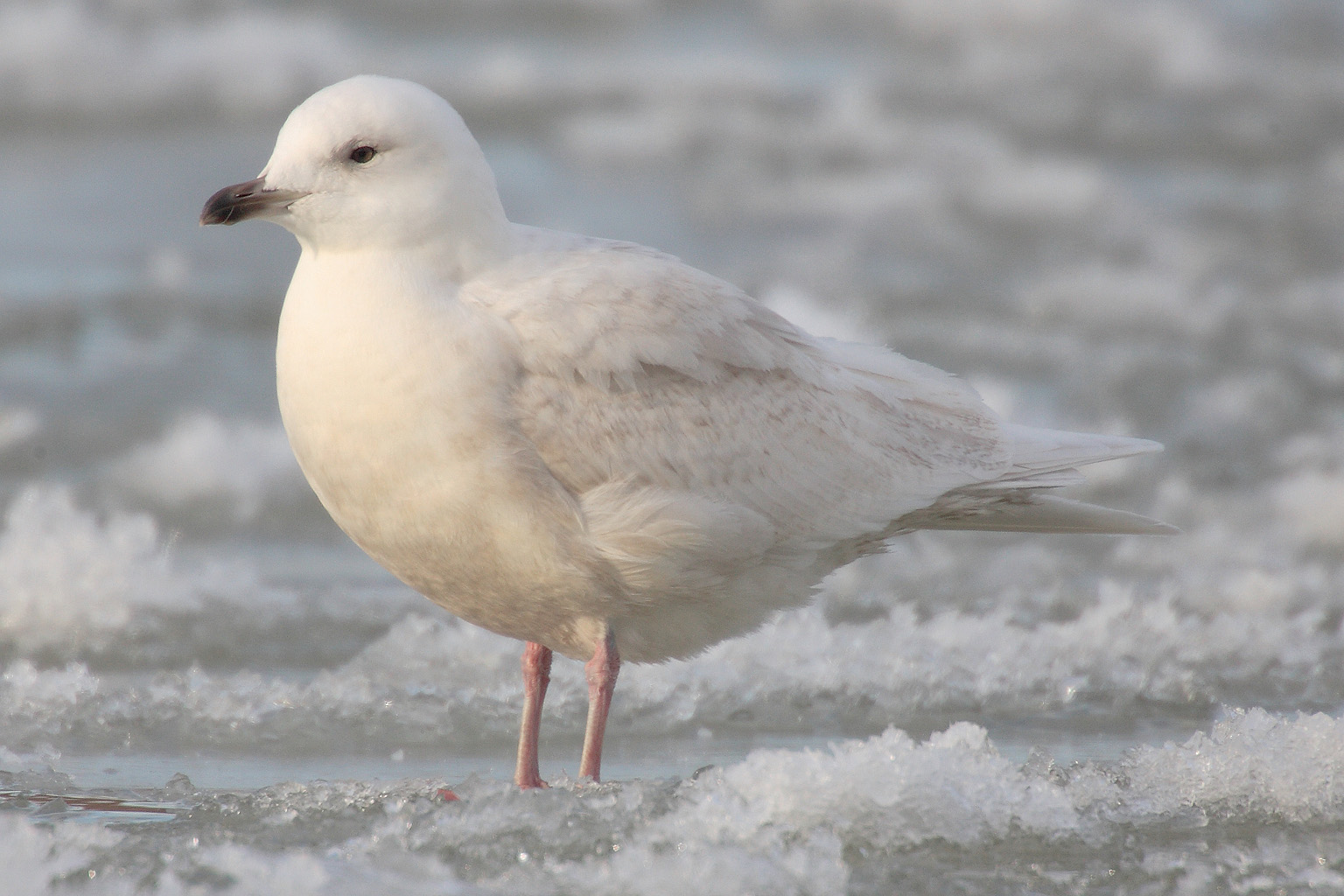
Iceland gull
Larus glaucoides
hvidvinget måge

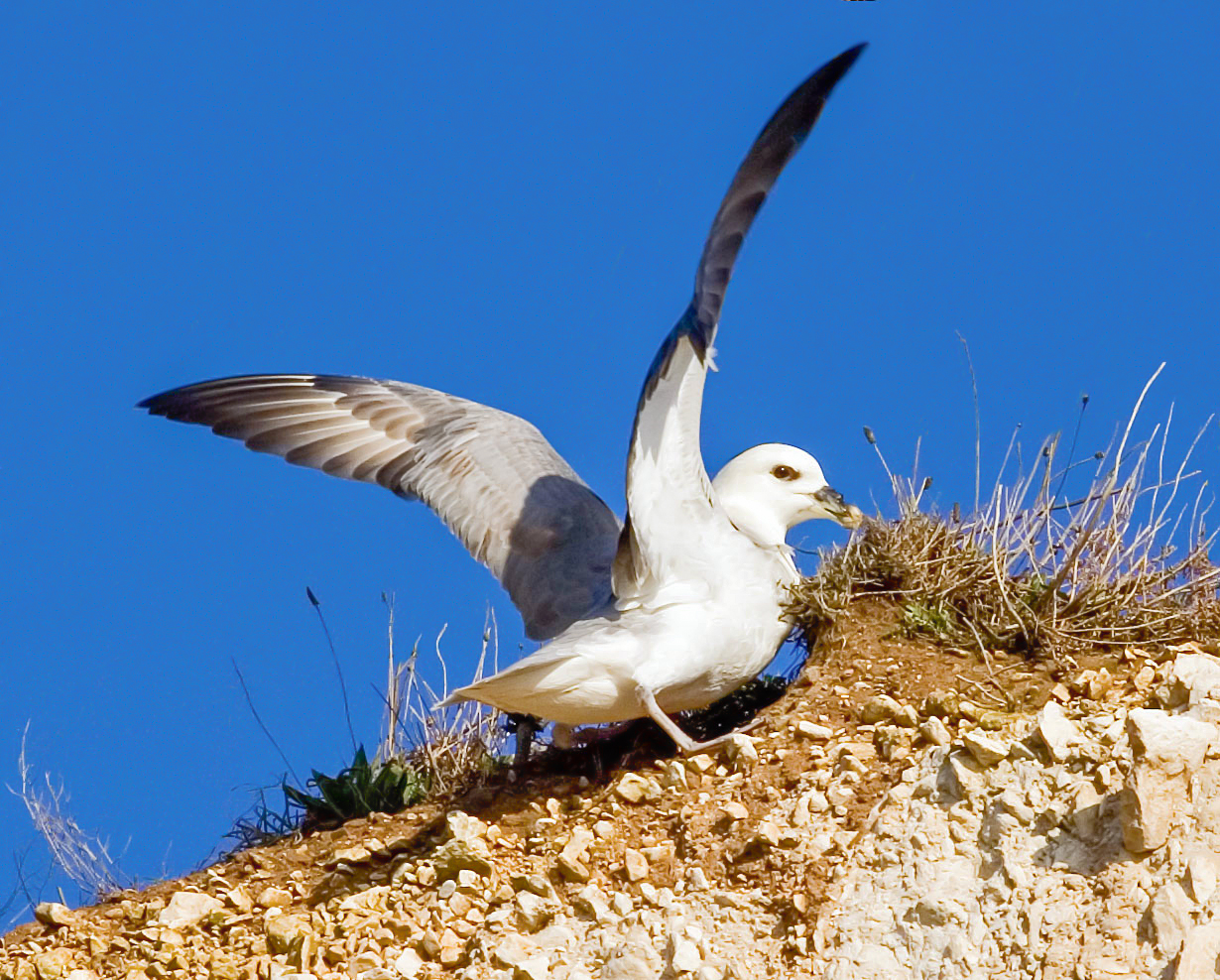
Northern fulmar
Fulmarus glacialis
mallemuk

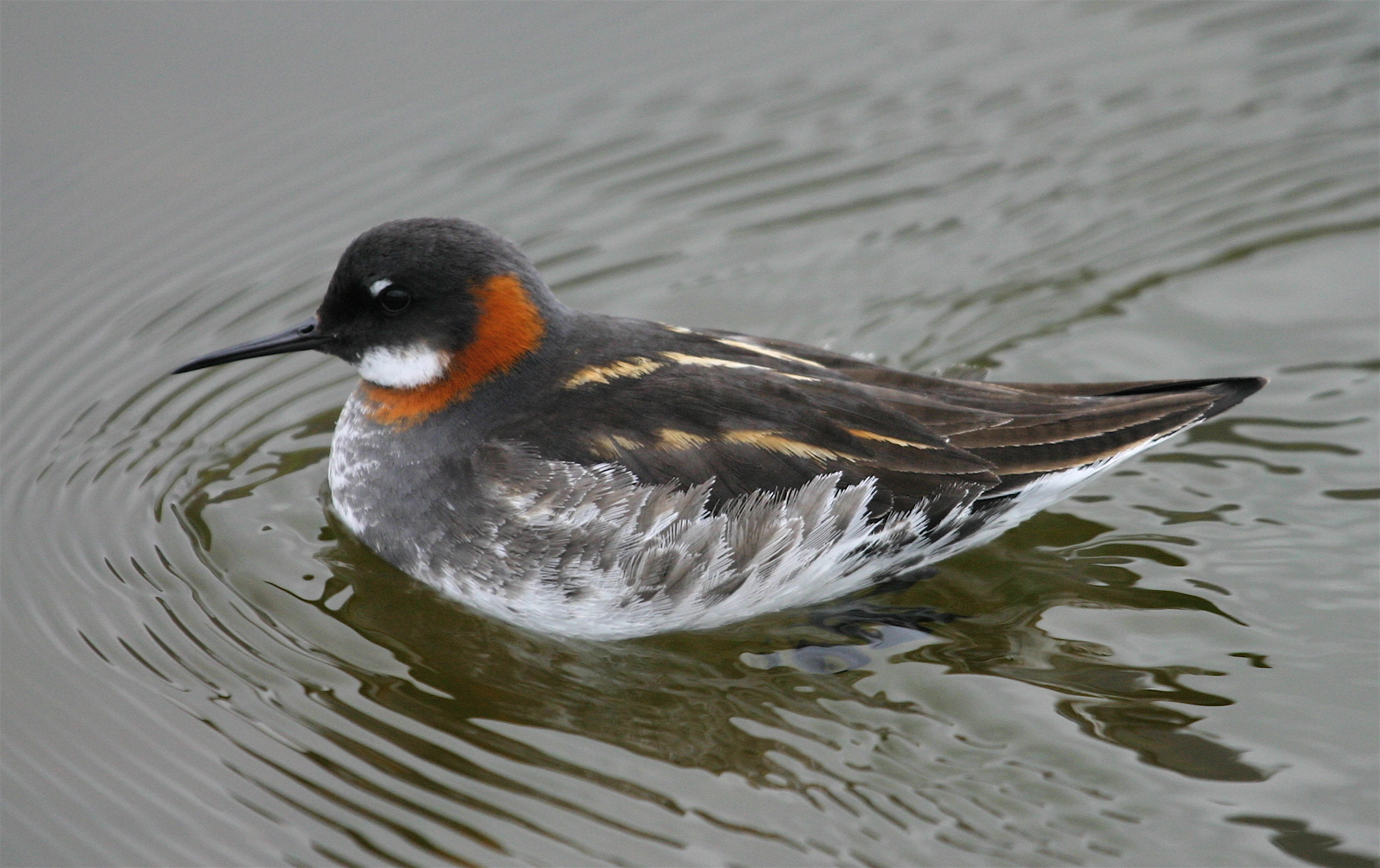
Red-necked phalarope
Phalaropus lobatus
odinshane

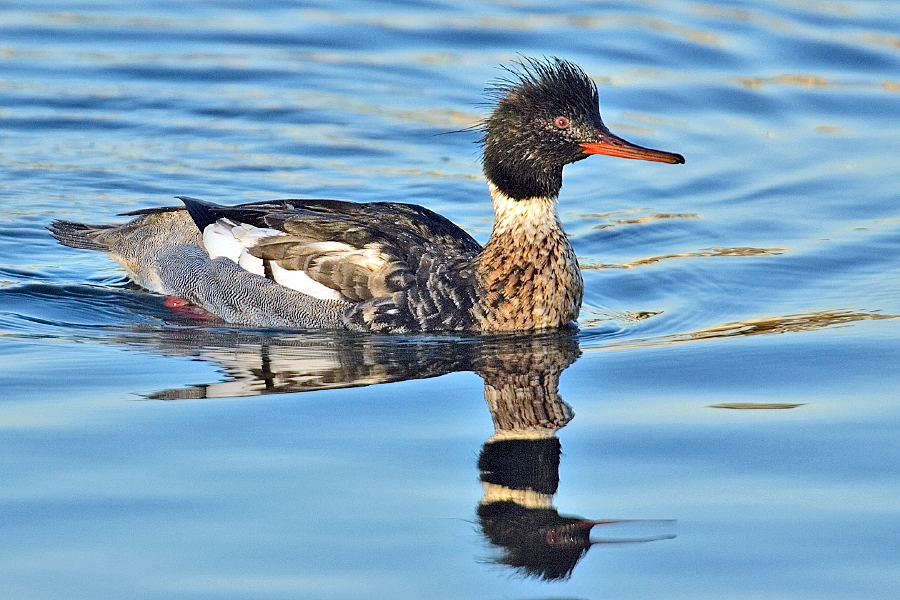
Red-breasted merganser
Mergus serrator
toppet skallesluger

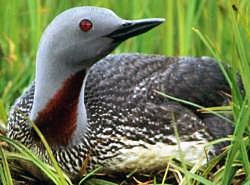
Red-throated diver
Gavia stellata
rødstrubet lom

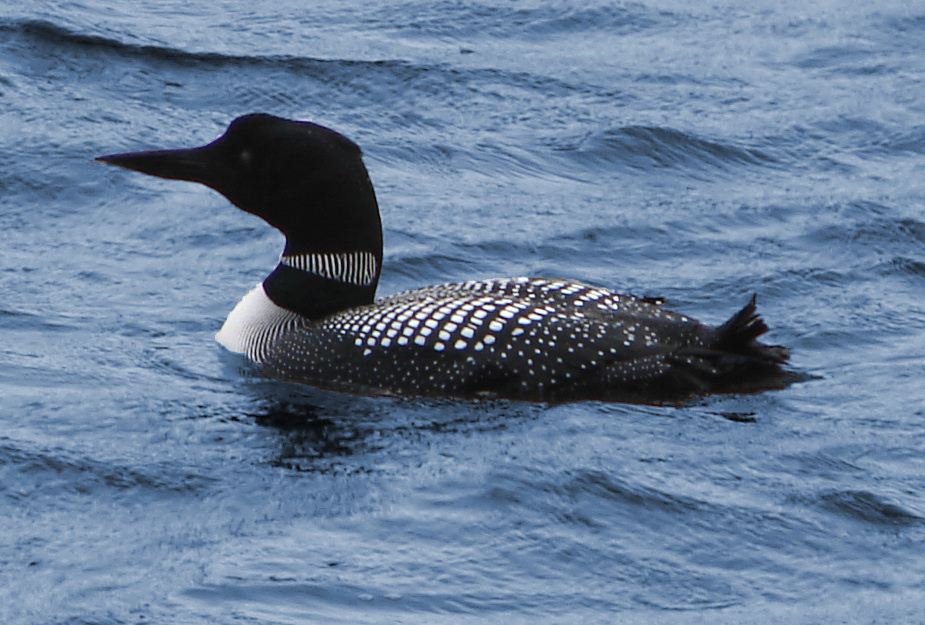
Great northern diver
Gavia immer
islom

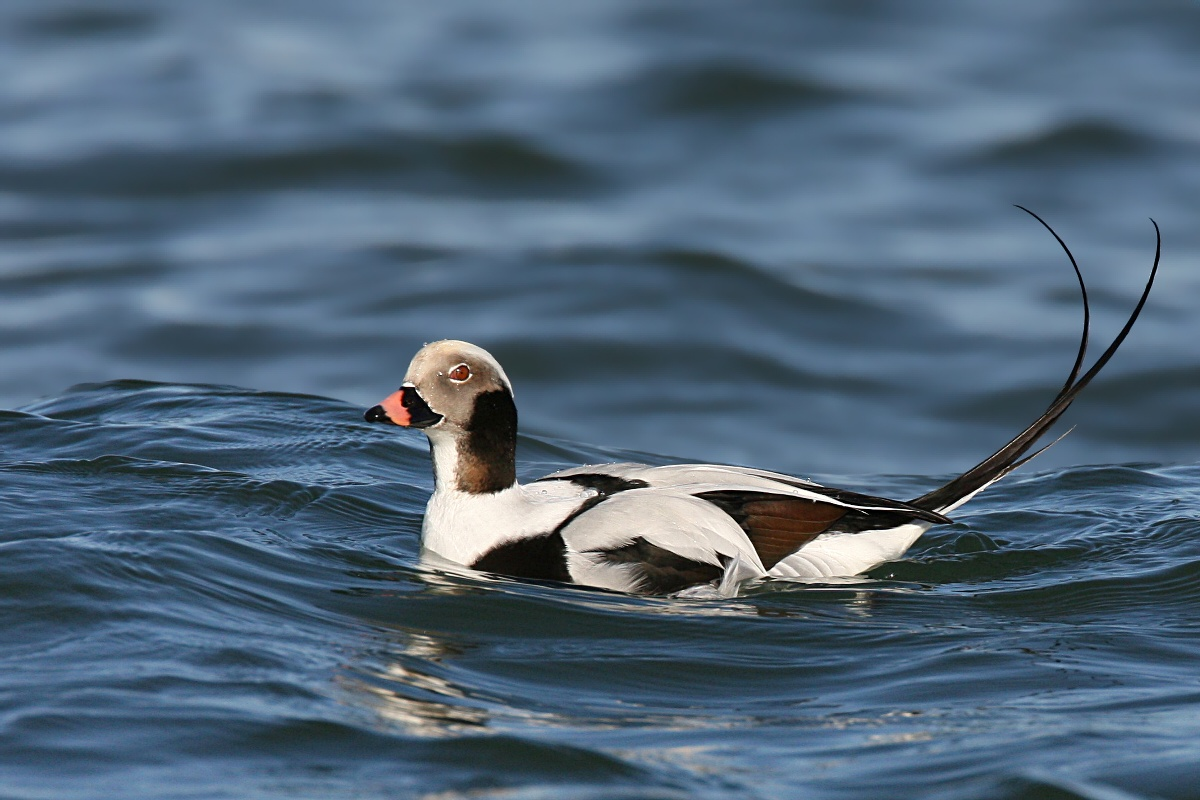
Long-tailed duck (male)
Clangula hyemalis
havlit

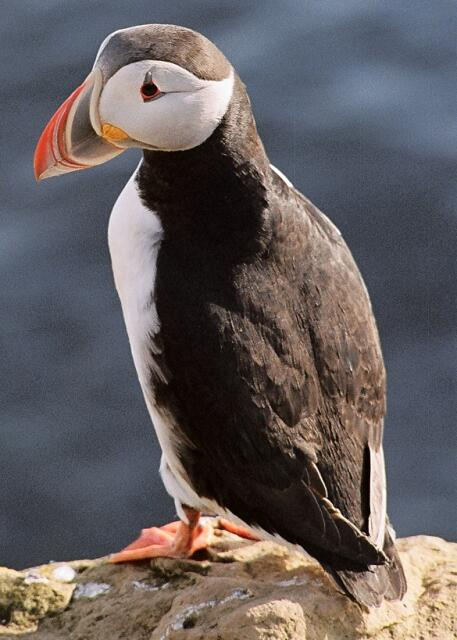
Atlantic puffin
Fratercula arctica
lunde

=== Fish ===
Of the many species of fish inhabiting Greenland's waters, several have been of economic importance, including cod, caplin, halibut, rockfish, nipisak (Cycloperteus lumpus) and sea trout. The Greenland shark is used for the oil in its liver, as well as fermented and eaten as hákarl, a local delicacy.

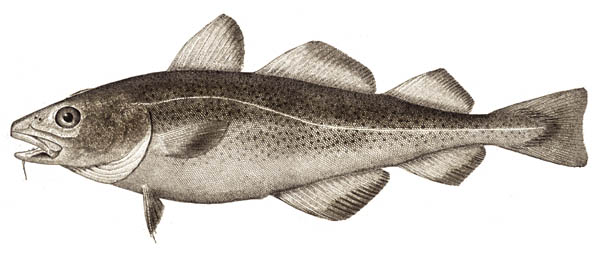
Atlantic cod
Gadus ogac
torsk

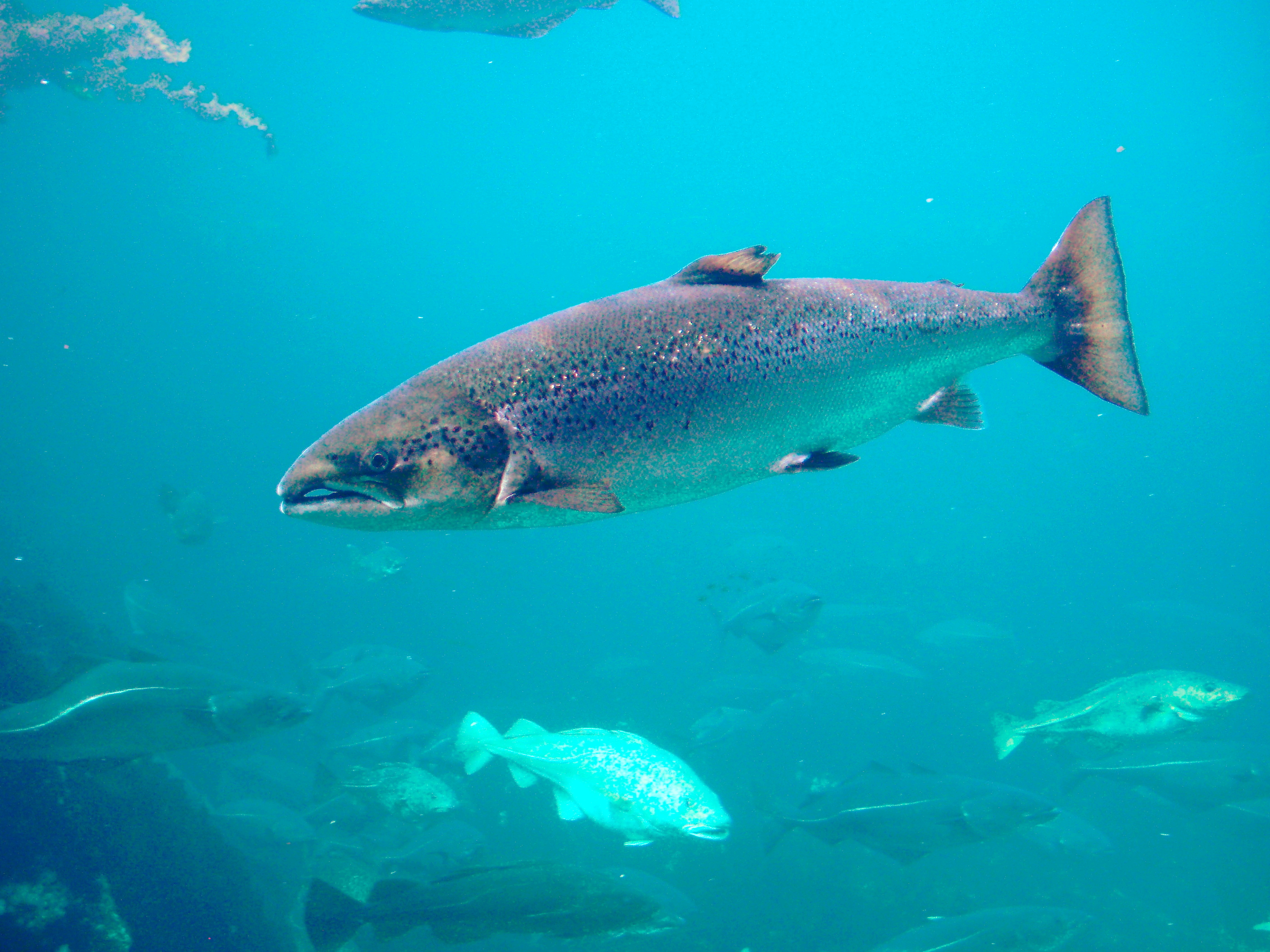
Atlantic salmon
Salmo salar
laks

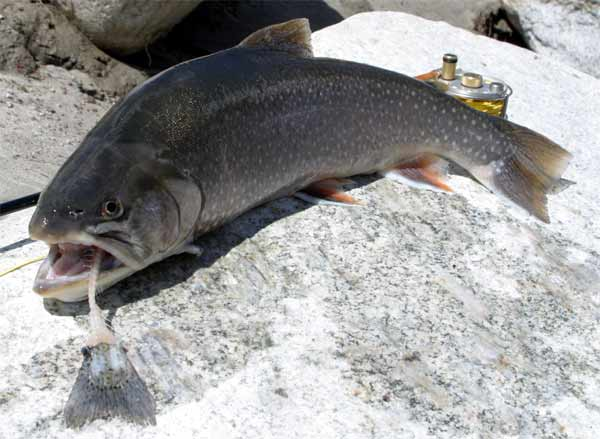
Arctic char
Salvelinus alpinus
fjeldørred

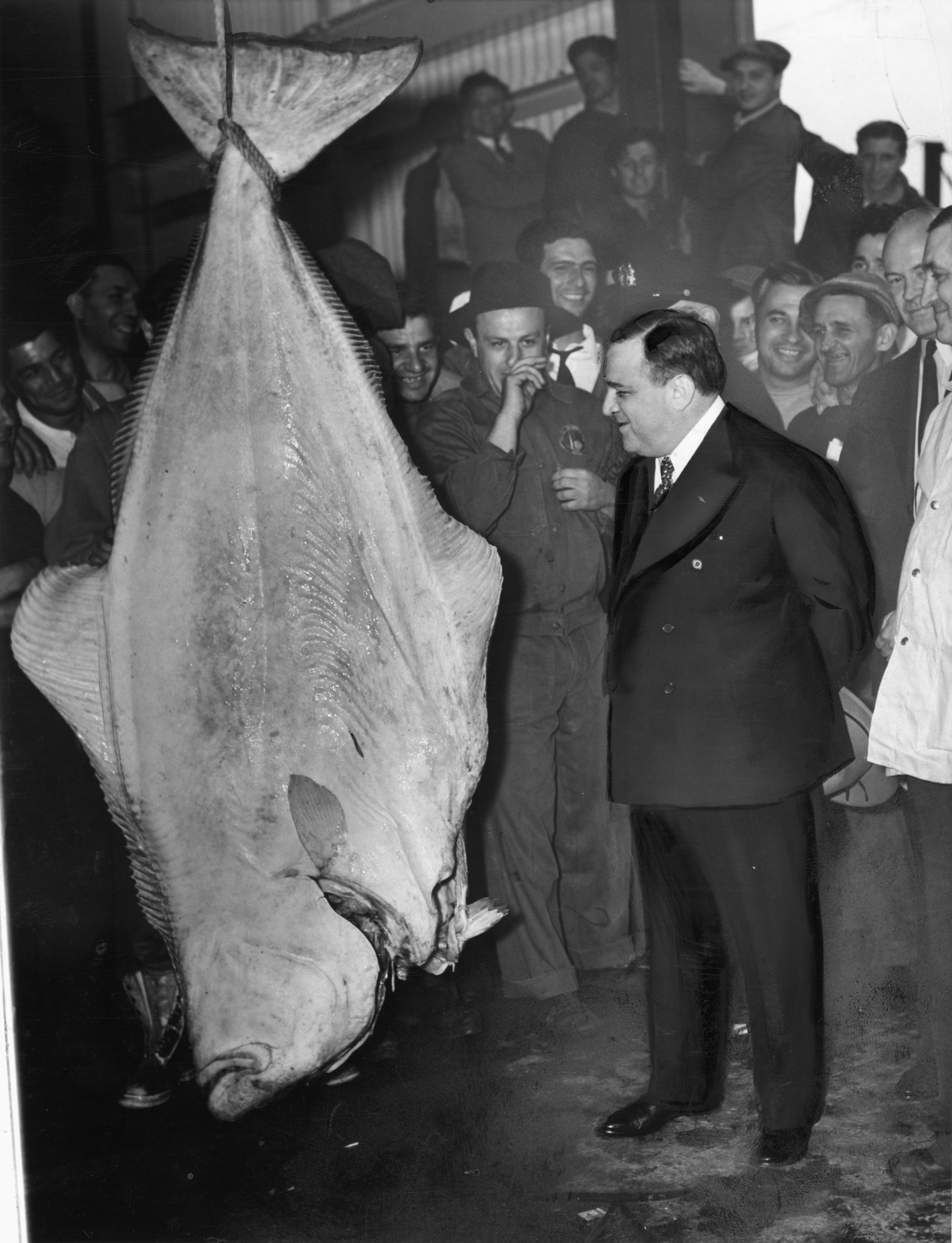
Halibut
Hippoglossus hippoglossus
helleflynder

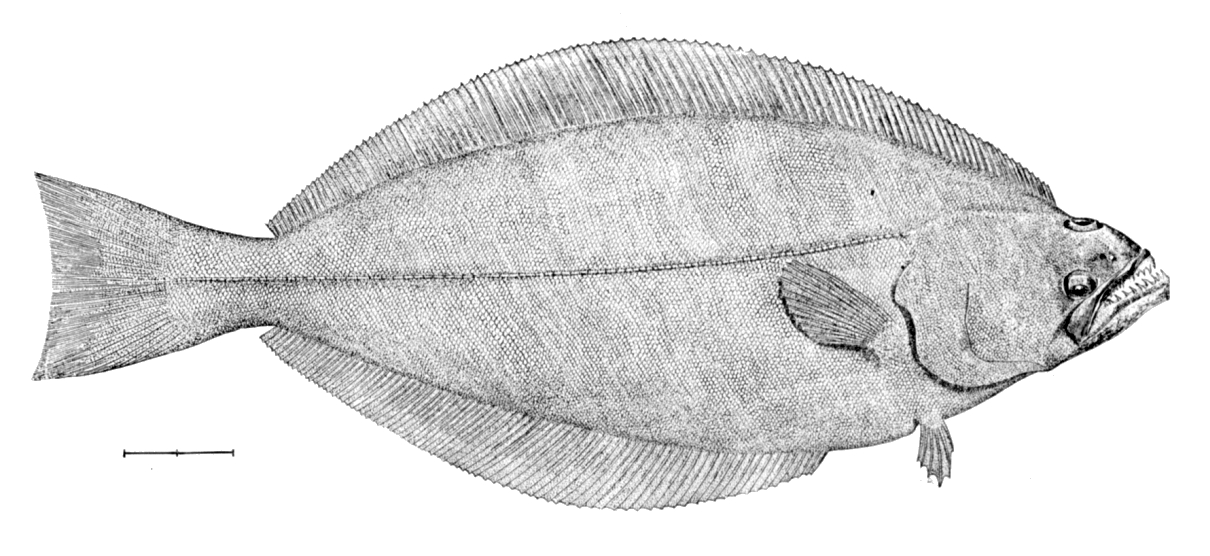
Greenland halibut
Reinhardtius hippoglossoides
hellefisk

Rose fish
Sebastes norvegicus
rødfisk

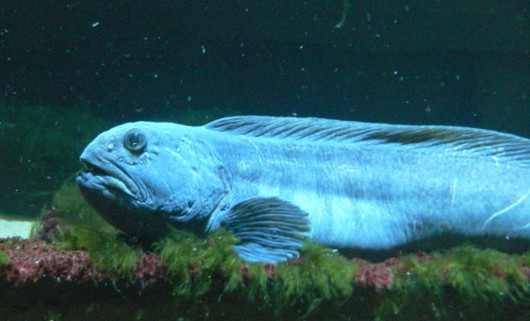
Seawolf
Anarhichas lupus
havkat

== See also ==
Fauna

- List of mammals of Nunavut
- List of Nunavut birds

Flora

- List of Canadian plants by family
