= Greenlandic sheep =

Breed of sheep

The Greenlandic sheep (Greenlandic: kalaallit savaataat or sava, Danish: grønlandsk får) is a breed of domestic sheep. The Greenlandic breed is one of the Northern European short-tailed sheep, which exhibit a fluke-shaped, naturally short tail. The Greenlandic is a mid-sized breed, generally short-legged and stocky, with face and legs free of wool. The fleece of the Greenlandic sheep is dual-coated and comes in white as well as a variety of other colors, including a range of browns, grays, and blacks. They exist in both horned and polled strains. Generally left unshorn for the winter, the breed is very cold-hardy. Multiple births are very common in Greenlandic ewes, with a lambing percentage of 150% - 190%.

They are seasonal breeders and come into estrus around October. The breeding season can last up to four months. Rams become mature early and can start breeding as early as five months.

The present Greenlandic sheep is hardy and thrifty. It descends from Faroe and Icelandic sheep, the Spælsau and the Scottish Blackface, brought to Greenland by Greenladic farmers, Greenlandic sheep have been bred since 1906 in a very harsh environment. Consequently, they are quite efficient herbivores. The breed descends from the same stock as the Norwegian Spelsau.

== Color genetics ==
The colors of Greenlandic sheep are inherited in a similar way to those of other sheep, but they display more variety in color and pattern than most other breeds, and there are some variations not seen in other sheep. Each sheep carries three genes that affect the color of the sheep, and for each gene, there are dominant and recessive alleles. Each lamb will receive one allele from each parent of each of the genes shown below.

Locus	Gene name	Dominant alleles	Recessive alleles
B	Base color	black	brown (moorit)
A (agouti gene)	Pattern	white (gray, badgerface, mouflon)	(gray, badgerface, mouflon) solid
S	Spotting	no spotting	spotting

=== Color ===
The base color of all Icelandic sheep is either black, white or moorit (brown), each coming in a variety of shades and tones. Black is the dominant allele. The appearance of these colors can be altered by patterns and spotting.

=== Pattern ===
There are six patterns alleles in the breed. The most dominant pattern of these is white, which will conceal any other pattern, color or spotting that may be present, producing a solid white sheep.

There are several other patterns which will change the appearance of the color the animal shows. One of these is gray, which, together with the base color gene, will give rise to either gray black or gray moorit. Another is "badgerface", which shows as lighter coloration on the back, sides, neck, ears and face, with a darker color on the underbelly, under the tail, parts of the neck and around the eyes. Once again, this pattern will show as either grey badgerface or moorit badgerface. A further pattern is "mouflon". These sheep will be light-colored where badgerface sheep are dark, and dark where badgerface sheep are light.

The gray, badgerface, and mouflon patterns are equally dominant. A sheep can display any of these patterns individually, or they can display two of them at the same time. Sheep carrying both badgerface and mouflon show as plain-coloured sheep with slightly darker markings where the two patterns meet.

The least dominant pattern is solid, which is essentially no pattern at all. Solid-patterned animals will simply show their base color all over. To be solid, a sheep must inherit the solid pattern from both parents – the parents could be solid themselves, or they could carry a solid allele hidden by another other pattern allele.

White sheep can also carry any one of the five other patterns, but it will be hidden by the dominant white color (note that white in sheep is genetically a pattern, not a color).

=== Spotting ===
This gene gives rise to white markings on the feet, face, head or over large parts of the body. The unspotted areas may be any of the patterns and colors described above.

There are two alleles for spotting: spotted, and unspotted; unspotted is dominant. Only when bearing two spotting alleles will the sheep display spotting.

== Meat production ==
In Greenland, this breed is almost exclusively bred for meat. Lambs are not fed grain or given hormones. The meat has a fine grain and distinct, delicate flavor. The meat of the Greenlandic sheep is quite special and considered by many experts to be among the best in the world and considered a gourmet style of meat. The taste and quality are closely linked to the animals’ life conditions.

== Fiber ==
Greenlandic fleece is dual-coated. When the long and finer coat is separated, the outer and inner coats are used for different woolen products, though the transport cost has up to now stopped all industrial use of the Greenlandic wool.

== Milk ==
Sheep are not milked in Greenland, and instead the lamb is allowed to continue suckling.
