= Old Norwegian Sheep =

Breed of sheep

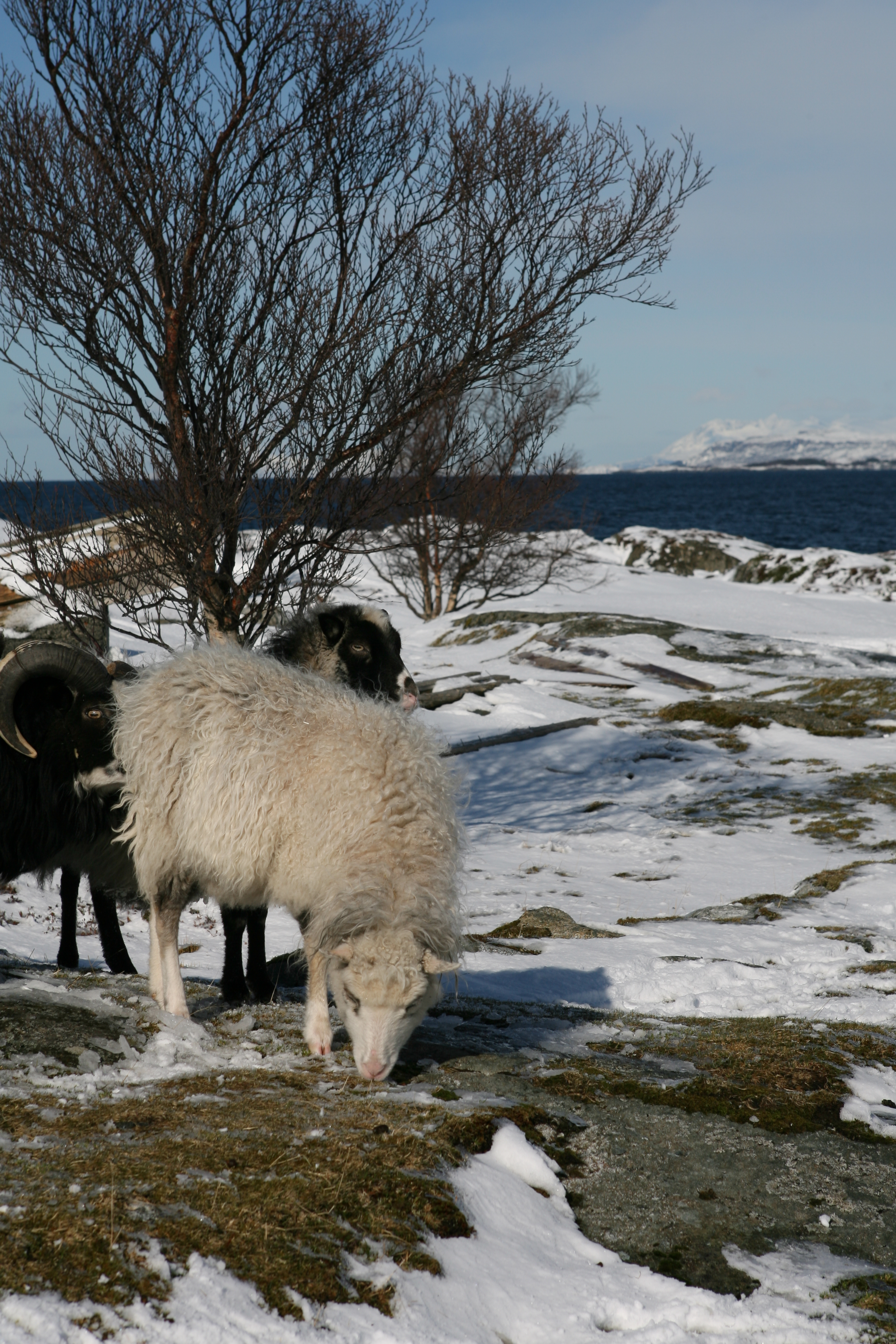
Old Norwegian Sheep at Prestøya, Brønnøy, Norway

The Old Norwegian Sheep (Norwegian: Gammelnorsk sau) is likely the breed that most closely resembles the original Northern European short-tailed sheep in Norway. Although the breed almost went extinct at several points in the last century, conservation efforts have succeeded in growing the population to around 30,000 animals and the breed is no longer considered threatened. The breed is particularly suited for being kept outside all year, a practice that stems back to the Viking Age.

== History and origins ==
The breed likely descends from bronze-age sheep from Western Norway. This was the most common breed in Norway until the end of the 19th century, when it was overtaken by breeds that had been imported from England since the early 1700s. In the beginning 20th century, only small and scattered populations of Norwegian short-tailed sheep remained. Today, all Old Norwegian Sheep descend from a herd from Austevoll Municipality.

=== Split from Spælsau ===
In 1912, two breeding programmes were started to conserve what remained of this original Norwegian sheep stock. One of these breeding stations housed coastal sheep, which eventually gave rise to the Old Norwegian Sheep, whereas the other breeding station housed inland sheep, which eventually gave rise to the closely related Spælsau.

== Characteristics ==
Old Norwegian Sheep is small and easy at foot. The colour scheme varies greatly. Unlike Spælsau, it is not desirable for the wool to be long, as this can cause issues during winter. The breed naturally sheds its wool, and so there should be little or no need to shear. Rams should have horns and ewes may have horns.

=== Herd behaviour ===
Ewes and lambs form herds of 20-40 animals, whilst rams form herds of their own. The breed is particularly alert, and there is always one individual on guard. When escaping predators, the herd will flee in a distinctive pattern that draws the predator towards the stronger animals thereby protecting weaker individuals. Because of the breed's speed, losses to predators are very rarely registered.

=== Grazing ===
The grazing habits of the Old Norwegian Sheep is adapted to the heather moorlands of Coastal Norway. In addition to common heather, Old Norwegian Sheep graze on leaves, herbs, kelp and other seaweeds. The breed can dig through the snow to reach heather even during the winter. This, combined with the relatively mild winters in Coastal Norway, means that the breed is capable of being kept outside the entire year.

=== Meat ===
The Old Norwegian Sheep does not produce a lot of meat. The meat is renowned for being tender and marbled. If reared traditionally, the taste is described as approaching gamey and is considered sweeter than normal mutton when cured.

== Protected brand name ==
Norsk Villsau (literally Norwegian Wild Sheep) is a trade mark for Old Norwegian Sheep that is reared in the traditional fashion by being kept outside all year in Norwegian heather moorland. Since 2010 Villsau fra Norskekysten (Wild Sheep from Coastal Norway) has also been a protected geographical indication in Norway. The owner of both the trademark and the protected geographical indication is the common-interest association Norsk Villsaulag. The creation of the brand name appears to correlate with a subsequent increased interest in keeping the breed.

== See also ==
- Northern European short-tailed sheep
