= Spælsau =

Norwegian breed of sheep

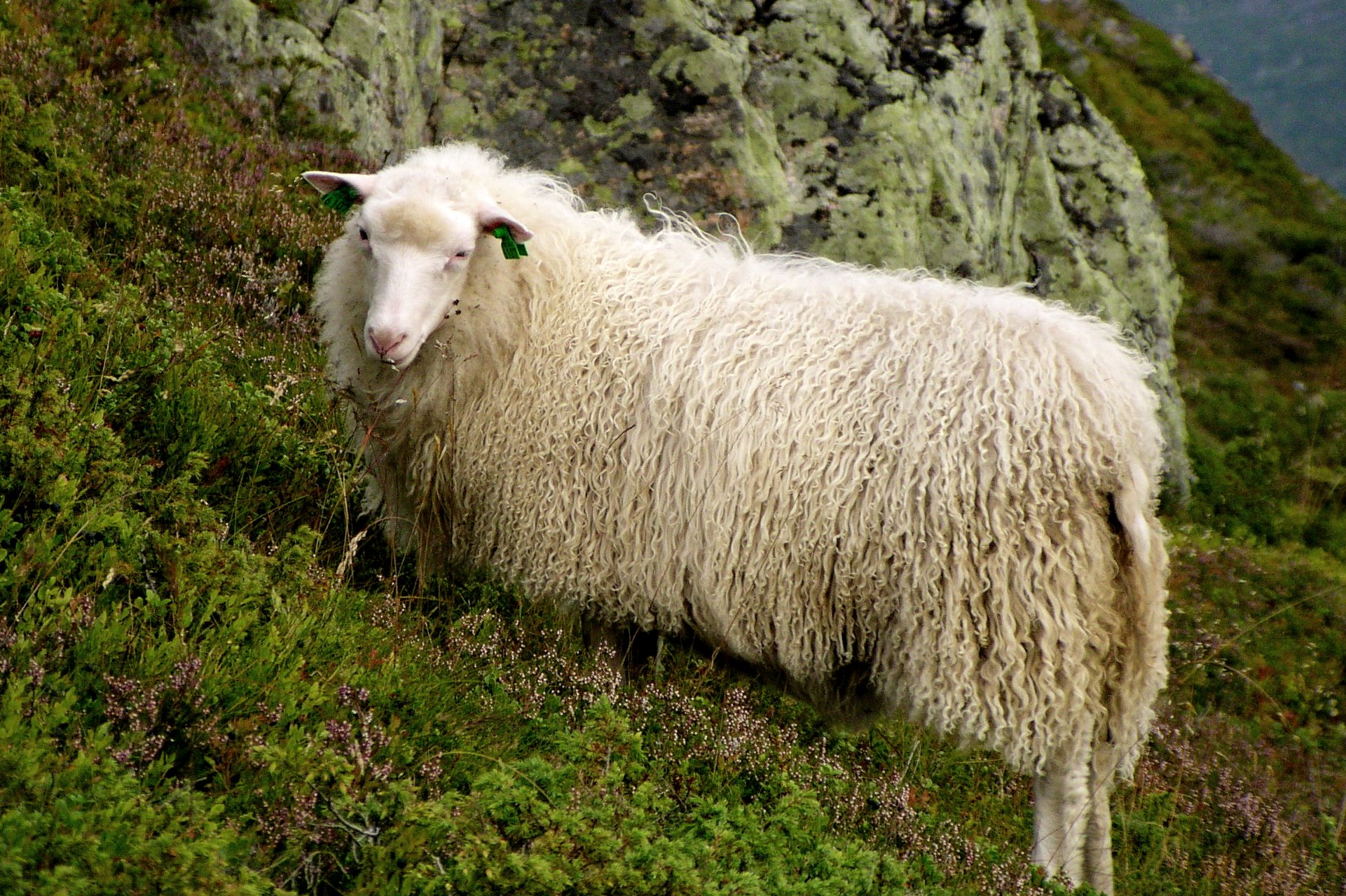

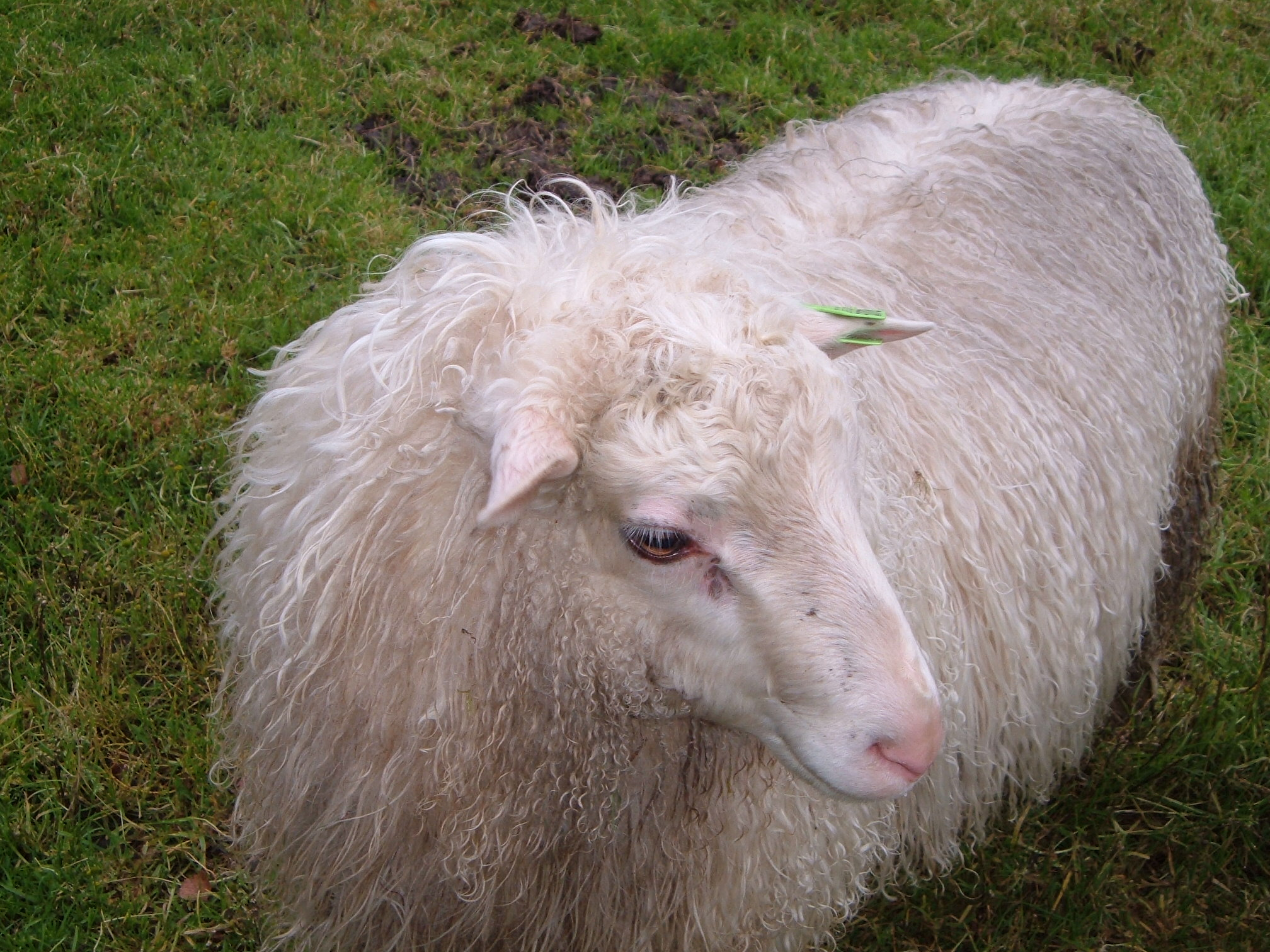
- Conservation status: FAO (2007): not at risk; DAD-IS (2026): not at risk
- Other names: Gamalnorsk spælsau; Kvit spælsau
- Country of origin: Norway
- Use: meat; milk; hides; wool; conservation grazing

Traits
- Weight: Male: 90 kg; Female: 63 kg
- Horn status: usually polled

The Spælsau is a Norwegian breed or breed grouping of domestic sheep in the Northern European short-tailed group of traditional breeds of sheep.

The sheep derive from the Gamalnorsk sau or Old Norwegian Sheep. Two breeds or types are reported: an old type, the Gamalnorsk spælsau ('old Norwegian short-tailed sheep') and the modern Kvit spælsau ('white short-tailed sheep').

== History ==
A herd-book for the old type was started in 1947.

== Characteristics ==
For the old type, average body weights are 63 kg for ewes and 90 kg for rams.

== Use ==
Both the old and the modern type of Spælsau may be kept for meat, milk, hides and wool; they may also be used in conservation grazing.
