= Outline of Greenland =

Constituent country of Denmark

The Flag of Greenland

The Coat of arms of Greenland

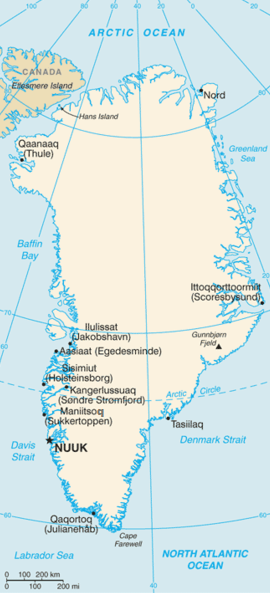
An enlargeable map of Greenland

The following outline is provided as an overview of and topical guide to Greenland:

Greenland – autonomous Nordic nation that is a constituent country of the Kingdom of Denmark. Greenland comprises the Island of Greenland and adjacent islands located between the Arctic and Atlantic Oceans, east of the Canadian Arctic Archipelago. Though physiographically and ethnically an Arctic island nation associated with the continent of North America, politically and historically, Greenland is associated with Europe, specifically Iceland, Norway, and Denmark. In 1978, Denmark granted home rule to Greenland, making it an equal member of the Danish Realm. Greenland is, by area, the world's largest island which is not a continent in its own right.

== General reference ==
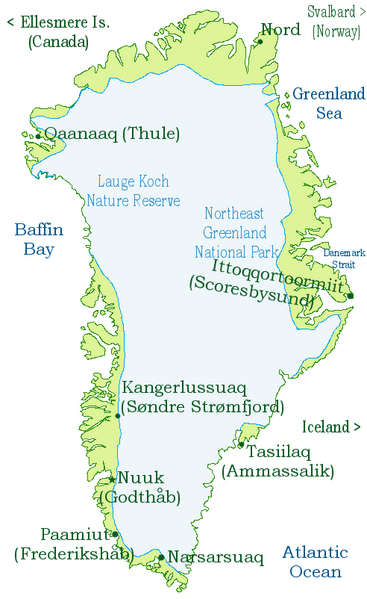
An enlargeable map of Greenland

- Pronunciation: /ˈɡriːnlənd/
- Common English country name: Greenland
- Official English country name: Greenland of the Kingdom of Denmark
- Common endonym(s): Kalaallit Nunaat
- Official endonym(s): Kalaallit Nunaat
- Adjectival(s): Greenlandic (disambiguation)
- Demonym(s): Greenlander(s)
- Etymology: Name of Greenland
- ISO country codes: GL, GRL, 304
- ISO region codes: See ISO 3166-2:GL
- Internet country code top-level domain: .gl

== Geography of Greenland ==
Geography of Greenland

- Greenland is: an autonomous territory of the Kingdom of Denmark
- Location:
  - Northern Hemisphere and Western Hemisphere
    - North America (though not on the mainland)
  - Between the Arctic Ocean and Atlantic Ocean
  - Time zones:
    - Danmarkshavn and Ittoqqortoormiit – UTC+00
    - Pituffik – UTC-03
    - Rest of Greenland – UTC-02
  - Extreme points of Greenland
    - High: Gunnbjørn Fjeld 3,700 m (12,139 ft) – highest point in the Arctic
    - Low: Arctic Ocean and North Atlantic Ocean 0 m
  - Land boundaries: Canada 1,280 m (4,200 feet)
  - Coastline: 44,087 km
- Population of Greenland: 56,344
- Area of Greenland: 2,166,086 km^{2}
- Atlas of Greenland

=== Environment of Greenland ===
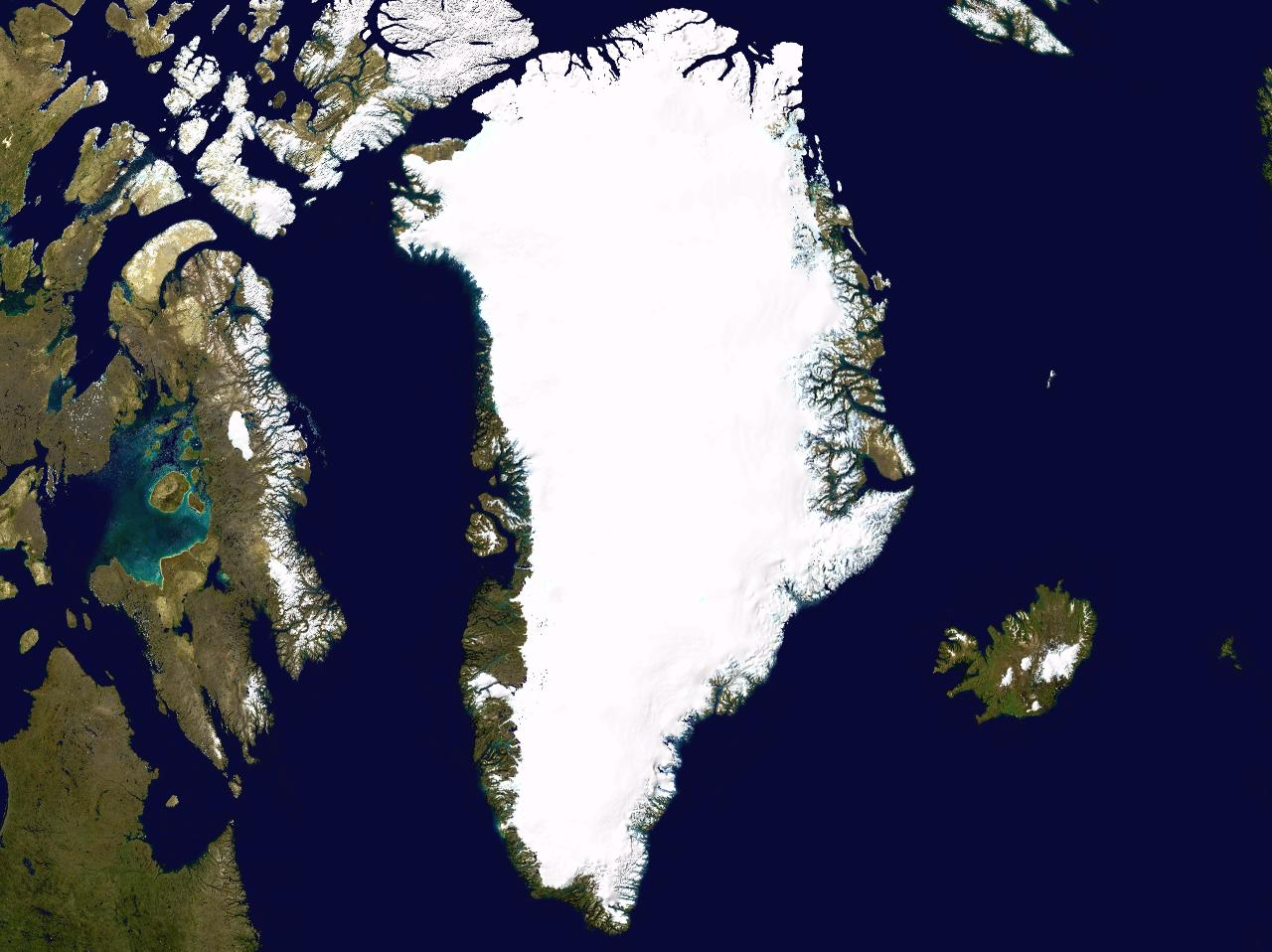
An enlargeable satellite composite image of Greenland

- Climate of Greenland
- Environmental issues in Greenland
- Renewable energy in Greenland
- Geology of Greenland
- Protected areas of Greenland
  - Biosphere reserves in Greenland
  - National parks of Greenland
- Wildlife of Greenland
  - Flora of Greenland
    - Flora and fauna of Greenland
  - Fauna of Greenland
    - Birds of Greenland
    - Mammals of Greenland
    - Flora and fauna of Greenland

==== Natural geographic features of Greenland ====
- Canyons of Greenland
  - Greenland's Grand Canyon
- Fjords of Greenland
- Glaciers of Greenland
- Islands of Greenland
- Lakes of Greenland
- Mountains of Greenland
- Rivers of Greenland
  - Waterfalls of Greenland
- Valleys of Greenland
- World Heritage Sites in Greenland

=== Regions of Greenland ===
Regions of Greenland

==== Ecoregions of Greenland ====
List of ecoregions in Greenland

==== Administrative divisions of Greenland ====
Administrative divisions of Greenland

- Counties of Greenland
  - Municipalities of Greenland

===== Counties of Greenland =====
Counties of Greenland

===== Municipalities of Greenland =====
Municipalities of Greenland

- Capital of Greenland: Nuuk
- Cities of Greenland

=== Demography of Greenland ===
Demographics of Greenland

== Government and politics of Greenland ==
Politics of Greenland

- Form of government: parliamentary representative democratic Danish dependency
- Capital of Greenland: Nuuk
- Elections in Greenland
- Political parties in Greenland

=== Branches of the government of Greenland ===
Government of Greenland

==== Executive branch of the government of Greenland ====
- Head of state: King of Denmark, King Frederik X, represented by High Commissioner of Greenland, Julie Præst Wilche
- Head of government: Prime Minister of Greenland, Jens-Frederik Nielsen

==== Legislative branch of the government of Greenland ====
- Landsting (unicameral)

==== Judicial branch of the government of Greenland ====
Court system of Greenland

- Landsret

=== Foreign relations of Greenland ===
Foreign relations of Greenland

- Diplomatic missions in Greenland
- Diplomatic missions of Greenland
- Greenland and the European Union

==== International organization membership ====
The government of Greenland is a member of:

- Arctic Council
- Nordic Council (NC)
- Nordic Investment Bank (NIB)
- Universal Postal Union (UPU)
- Human rights in Greenland
  - LGBT rights in Greenland
  - Freedom of religion in Greenland
- Law enforcement in Greenland

=== Military of Greenland ===
Military of Greenland

- Command
  - Commander-in-chief:
    - Ministry of Defence of Greenland: None, Island Command Greenland is de facto defense command
- Forces
  - Greenlandic Coast Guard
  - Army of Greenland: None, Defense is the responsibility of Denmark
  - Navy of Greenland: None, Defense is the responsibility of Denmark
  - Air Force of Greenland: None, Defense is the responsibility of Denmark
  - Special forces of Greenland: None, Defense is the responsibility of Denmark
- Greenland in World War II

=== Local government in Greenland ===
Administrative divisions of Greenland

The four municipalities of Greenland, and Northeast Greenland National Park (the unlabeled area)

- Municipalities:
  - Qaasuitsup
  - Qeqqata
  - Sermersooq
  - Kujalleq
- Northeast Greenland National Park

== History of Greenland ==
- Military history of Greenland

== Culture of Greenland ==
Culture of Greenland

- Architecture of Greenland
- Cuisine of Greenland
- Festivals in Greenland
- Languages of Greenland
- Media in Greenland
- National symbols of Greenland
  - Coat of arms of Greenland
  - Flag of Greenland
  - National anthem of Greenland
- People of Greenland
- Public holidays in Greenland
- Records of Greenland
- Religion in Greenland
  - Christianity in Greenland
- World Heritage Sites in Greenland

=== Art in Greenland ===
- Art in Greenland
  - List of Greenlandic artists
- Cinema of Greenland
- Literature of Greenland
- Music of Greenland
- Television in Greenland
- Theatre in Greenland

=== Sports in Greenland ===
Sports in Greenland

- Arctic Winter Games 2016
- Association football in Greenland
- Greenland at the Olympics
- Greenland men's national handball team
- Greenlandic National Badminton Championships

== Economy and infrastructure of Greenland ==
Economy of Greenland

- Economic rank, by nominal GDP (2007): 157th (one hundred and fifty seventh)
- Agriculture in Greenland
- Banking in Greenland
  - Bank of Greenland
- Communications in Greenland
  - Internet in Greenland
- Companies of Greenland
- Currency of Greenland: Krone
  - ISO 4217: DKK
- Energy in Greenland
  - Energy policy of Greenland
  - Oil industry in Greenland
- Mining in Greenland
  - Gemstone industry in Greenland
- Greenland Stock Exchange
- Tourism in Greenland
- Transport in Greenland
  - Airports in Greenland

== Education in Greenland ==
Education in Greenland

== See also ==
Greenland

- List of international rankings
- Outline of North America
- Outline of Denmark
- Outline of geography

== See also ==
- Lists of country-related topics
- Topic outline of geography
- Topic outline of Greenland
- Topic outline of North America
