= Karl Stephenson =

Karl Stephenson may refer to:

- Karl Stephenson (musician)
- Karl Stephenson (badminton) in Greenlandic National Badminton Championships

== See also ==
- Carl Stephenson (disambiguation)
