= Telecommunications in Greenland =

Telecommunications in Greenland include radio, television, fixed and mobile telephones, and the Internet.

Greenland has, by law, only one service provider for telecommunications and the Internet, TELE Greenland, which is fully owned by the Greenlandic Home Rule government. TELE Greenland provides switched telephone and data, land mobile communications, and VHF and MF shore-to-ship communication. This type of monopoly is not uncommon in Greenland.

== Radio and television ==
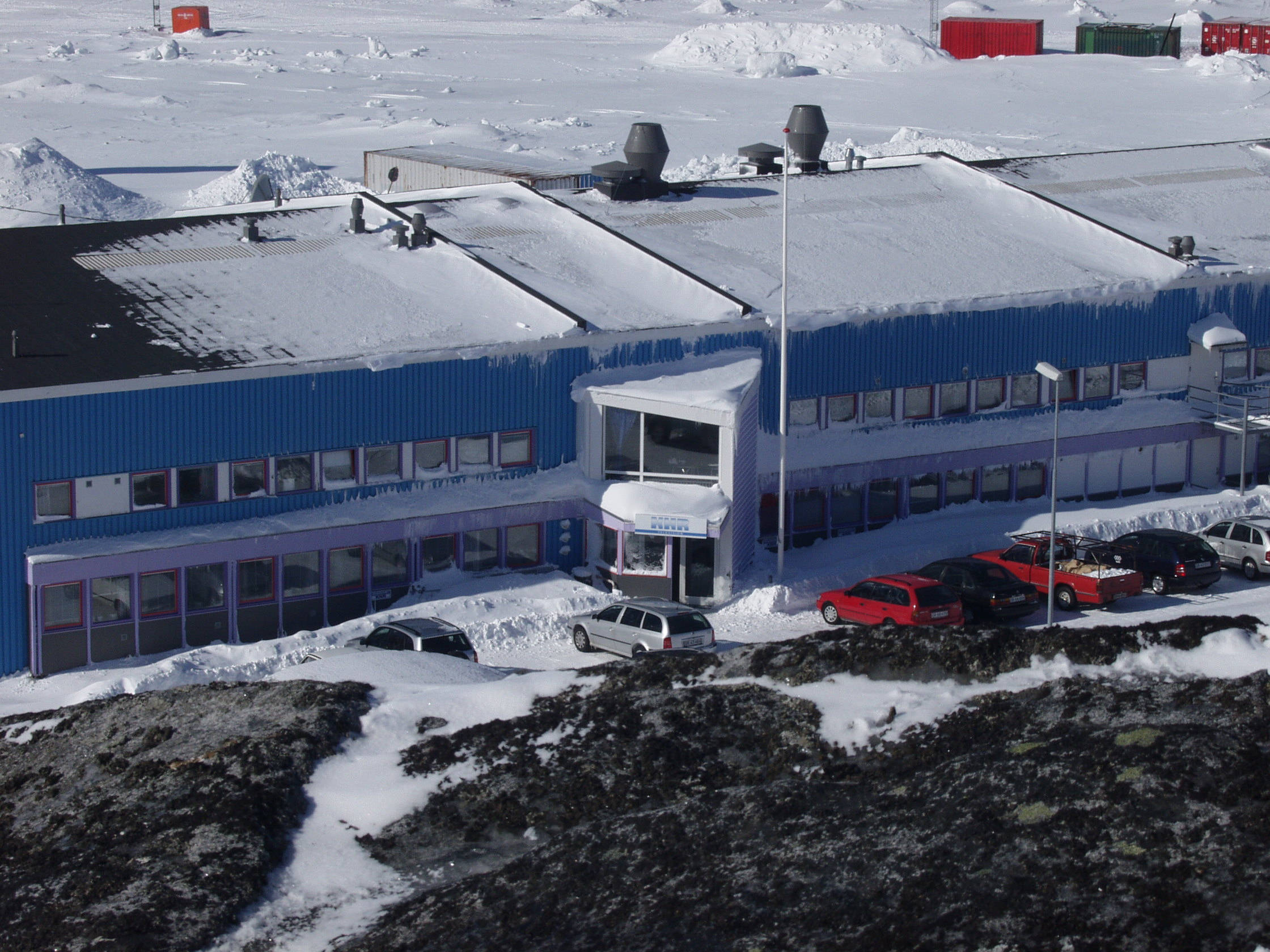
KNR Headquarters in Nuuk

Television in Greenland began in the 1960s.

Privately owned transmitters were created to receive TV from Canada, Iceland, and mainland Denmark. This can date as far back when television was introduced to Greenland in the 1960s. It was possible to receive TV from Canada with a normal household TV antenna, but color transmissions were NTSC and signals were in very bad quality and however in some circumstances, television transmissions were not available at all due to factors such as weather conditions or time of day, even for the people who owned private transmitters. Greenland did not have any local TV service until 1982.

The state broadcaster is Kalaallit Nunaata Radioa (KNR, Greenlandic Broadcasting Corporation), which provides one television and one radio service nationwide. Both broadcast in Greenlandic and Danish. Administered as an independent public corporation by the Greenlandic government, KNR has a seven-person board and management committee. They employ 100 people and are funded publicly and by advertising.

A few private local TV and radio stations are also available as Danish public radio rebroadcasts. An umbrella organization in Greenland, known as the STTK, operates local radio and TV stations throughout the country. There are also American Forces Network stations, operated by the United States Air Force.

Greenlanders owned an estimated 30,000 radios and 30,000 television sets, as of 2002.

== Telephones ==
- Calling code: +299
- International call prefix: 00
- Fixed telephone lines: 7,259 lines in use, 197th in the world (2019).
- Mobile telephone connections: 66,009, 202nd in the world (2019).

All telephone numbers have 6 digits.

There are adequate domestic and international telephone services, provided by cables and microwave radio relay. The system was totally digitized in 1995. The Greenland Connect submarine cable provides connectivity to Europe via Iceland and to North America via Newfoundland. TELE Greenland first used satellite communication in 1978 and currently uses 15 satellite earth stations (12 Intelsat, 1 Eutelsat, and 2 Americom GE-2), all over the Atlantic Ocean.

=== Mobile ===
As of 2019 there were 66,009 active mobile telephony subscriptions in use in Greenland. In 2007, all NMT (1G) networks were shut down. 4G launched in 2014.

Mobile coverage extends to nearly all inhabited areas in Greenland except some remote areas.

In Greenland, VHF radio-telephone is also used. Users make calls over a radio instead of a phone. Outside of Greenland, VHF phones are mainly used on ships, but in Greenland they can also be used as regular phones. In 2001, 42% of Greenlanders owned a portable VHF phone.

On September 30, 2022, Tele Greenland has collaborated with Swedish Telecommunications provider Ericsson in building a 5G network in Greenland.

== Internet ==
- Greenland has only one major Internet service provider (ISP): Tele Greenland (Tele Post Greenland A/S).
- Greenland has only one major data center: Owned by Tele Greenland in Nuuk.
- The country code for top-level domains is .gl
- 40,084 people or 64.48% of Greenland's population were able to use the Internet in 2019, placing Greenland 201st in the world.
- There were 13,192 fixed broadband subscriptions placing Greenland 164th in the world with a 23% penetration rate (2019).
- Greenland has been allocated 16,384 IPv4 addresses, less than 0.05% of the world's total or 284 addresses per 1000 people (2012).
- Internet and telephone services rely on the Greenland Connect submarine communications cables for external traffic.

=== Internet censorship and surveillance ===
As a territory of the Kingdom of Denmark, Greenland has a democratically elected home-rule government whose powers may encompass all matters except foreign and national security affairs, police services, and monetary matters. Greenlanders have the same rights throughout the kingdom as other citizens.

The Danish government places no restrictions on access to the Internet and there are no credible reports that e-mail or Internet chat rooms are monitored without appropriate legal authority. Authorities continue to employ an Internet filter designed to block child pornography. In no known cases did the filter affect legitimate sites. The Danish Constitution provides for freedom of speech and press with some limitations such as cases involving child pornography, libel, blasphemy, hate speech, and racism, and the government generally respects these rights in practice.

In April 2013, the registrar for the .gl domain unilaterally voluntarily suspended resolution of thepiratebay.gl, intended to be a new primary Domain Name for the famous Bittorrent search engine The Pirate Bay.
