= Carl Stephenson =

Carl Stephenson may refer to:

- Carl Stephenson (historian) (1886–1954), American medieval historian
- Carl Stephenson (writer) (1893–1983), German author of Leiningen Versus the Ants
- Carl Stephenson (producer), founder of musical group Forest for the Trees

== See also ==
- Karl Stephenson (disambiguation)
