= Hands off Greenland protests =

2026 anti-Trump protests in Denmark

- Part of the Greenland crisis and protests against Donald Trump
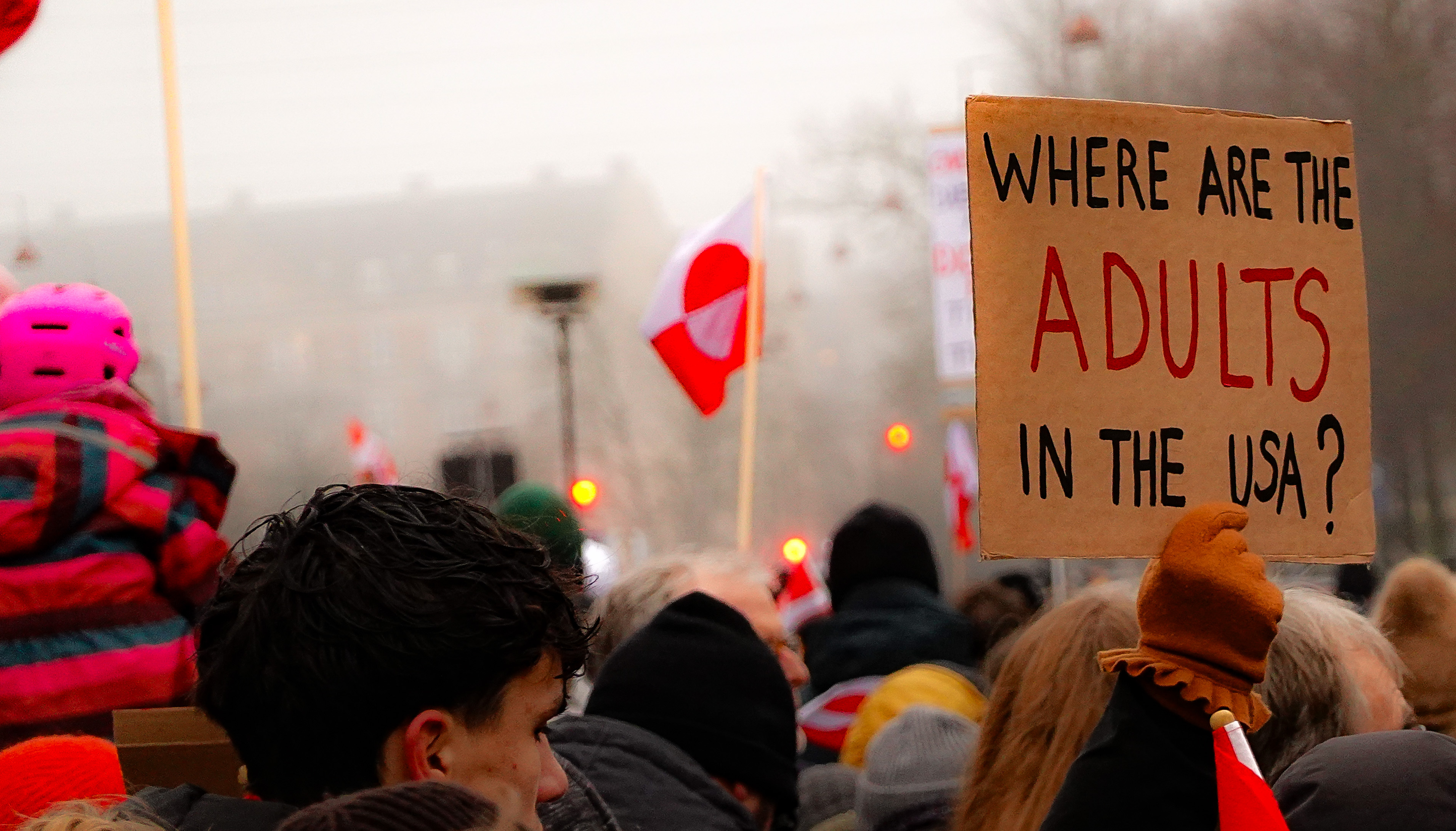
- Hands off Greenland protests in Copenhagen, 2026
- Date: 17 January 2026
- Location: Kingdom of Denmark (Denmark proper and Greenland) and Nunavut (Canada)
- Caused by: American expansionism under Donald Trump; Proposed United States acquisition of Greenland
- Goals: Condemn Donald J. Trump's expansionist attitude towards Greenland
- Methods: Political demonstrations
- Status: Ended: Largest protest in Greenland's history (25% of Nuuk mobilized)

Parties
(Denmark) (Greenland) (Nunavut) Protesters; Landsorganisationen for Grønlændere i Danmark; Hands off Kalaallit Nunaat; Fællesforeningen Inuit; Mellemfolkeligt Samvirke	United States federal government; Trump administration

Lead figures
(Greenland) Jens-Frederik Nielsen; Julie Rademacher; Poul Kristian Johansen; Sika Nuunu Kristensen; Anders Franssen; Camilla Siezing; (Nunavut) Aaju Peter	Donald Trump

Number
Denmark proper; 20,000 in Copenhagen; 5000 in Aarhus; 700 in Aalborg; Greenland; 4,000 in Nuuk; Nunavut; 70 in Iqaluit	

The Hands off Greenland protests occurred in numerous cities and towns across Greenland and metropolitan Denmark on 17 January 2026. Organized in response to the Greenland crisis caused by United States president Donald Trump's threats to annex Greenland, they represent the largest protests ever held in Greenland.

The protests prominently featured the slogan "Greenland is not for sale". Other slogans included "Yankee, Go Home" and "Make America Go Away". Red hats with the slogan "Make America Go Away" (MAGA) soared in popularity in response to the protests, becoming a symbol of anti-Trump defiance.

== History ==
=== Background ===
==== Escalation ====
Escalation of Donald Trump's threats to invade or annex Greenland further damaged relations between the United States and Denmark when, in December 2025, he unilaterally appointed Jeff Landry as "special envoy to Greenland". Landry subsequently stated that his objective was to make Greenland part of the US. In response, Danish Foreign Minister Lars Løkke Rasmussen called Landry's statements "completely unacceptable" and urged every nation, including the United States, to respect Danish sovereignty over the island.

Following the 2026 United States intervention in Venezuela, White House Deputy Chief of Staff Stephen Miller asserted that the US had the right to take Greenland. His wife, Katie Miller, published a map of Greenland covered in the US flag with the caption "SOON".

The situation escalated on 6 January 2026, when Trump claimed that he was open to use military force to acquire Greenland if necessary. Despite resistance from the Joint Chiefs of Staff, he ordered the Joint Special Operations Command to prepare a possible plan to invade and annex the territory. On 12 January, Trump stated that the US would own Greenland "one way or another", with Trump officials threatening to "take action" the following day, stating that the US could do so "within weeks". Amid the escalation, and a diplomatic discussion between European and US envoys, Operation Arctic Endurance, involving multiple NATO members, was called upon by Denmark.

==== Preparation of the protest ====
Following the escalation, multiple organizations, primarily Greenlandic, called upon citizens from Denmark to join the protest. One of the organizers, Uagut, stated that the goal of the "Hands off Greenland" protests was "to send a clear and unified message of respect for Greenland's democracy and fundamental human rights".

Thousands indicated on social media that they would participate, with at least 900 people confirming their participation on the official Facebook page for Greenland (approximately 1.6% of the territory's 56,000 residents). The rally in Copenhagen was scheduled to start at 12:00 EST (11:00 GMT), while the rally in Nuuk was scheduled for 16:00 WGT (15:00 GMT). The organizing bodies included UAGUT, "Hands Off Kalaallit Nunaat" (the Greenlandic name for the island), the "Inuit organization" (composed of over 20 other Inuit sub-organizations), and the NGO Mellemfolkeligt Samvirke.

After finding out of the protest, Aaju Peter—a local lawyer and activist of Iqaluit, the capital of the Canadian territory Nunavut—organized a local protest in the city in support of the people of Greenland, whom she defined as "one people" when compared to the indigenous people living in Nunavut. The protest was scheduled for 10:00 EST (15:00 GMT).

=== Protests ===
==== Canada ====
Up to 70 people showed up to the protest in Iqaluit despite the cold temperature, with the demographic of the protest being mixed between students, elderly and workers residing within the city.

==== Denmark ====
The protest in Copenhagen drew thousands of people to the streets, while other protests occurred spontaneously throughout mainland Denmark, in cities such as Aarhus, Aalborg and Odense. Prime Minister Mette Frederiksen also stated that it was "lovely" to see the unity of the protest. Estimates suggest that up to 20,000 people attended the Copenhagen rally.

==== Greenland ====
Participation in Greenland was estimated at 5,000 people (around 25% of Nuuk's population), making it the largest protest in Greenland's history. The prime minister of Greenland, Jens-Frederik Nielsen, was among those there.

== Symbols ==
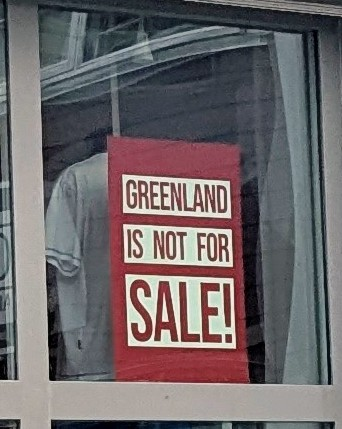
Window poster in Nuuk

The protests featured numerous symbols, including the flag of Denmark and the flag of Greenland. The flag of the Kalmar Union was also seen in the protests. The protesters were observed chanting "Kalaallit Nunaat" during the protests in Copenhagen and displayed slogans such as "Greenland is not for sale", "Yankee, Go Home", "Greenland for the Greenlanders", "USA already has too much ICE", as well as the name of the protest, "Hands off Greenland". The slogan "Make America Go Away", a parody of the Trump inspired slogan “Make America Great Again”, was also seen.

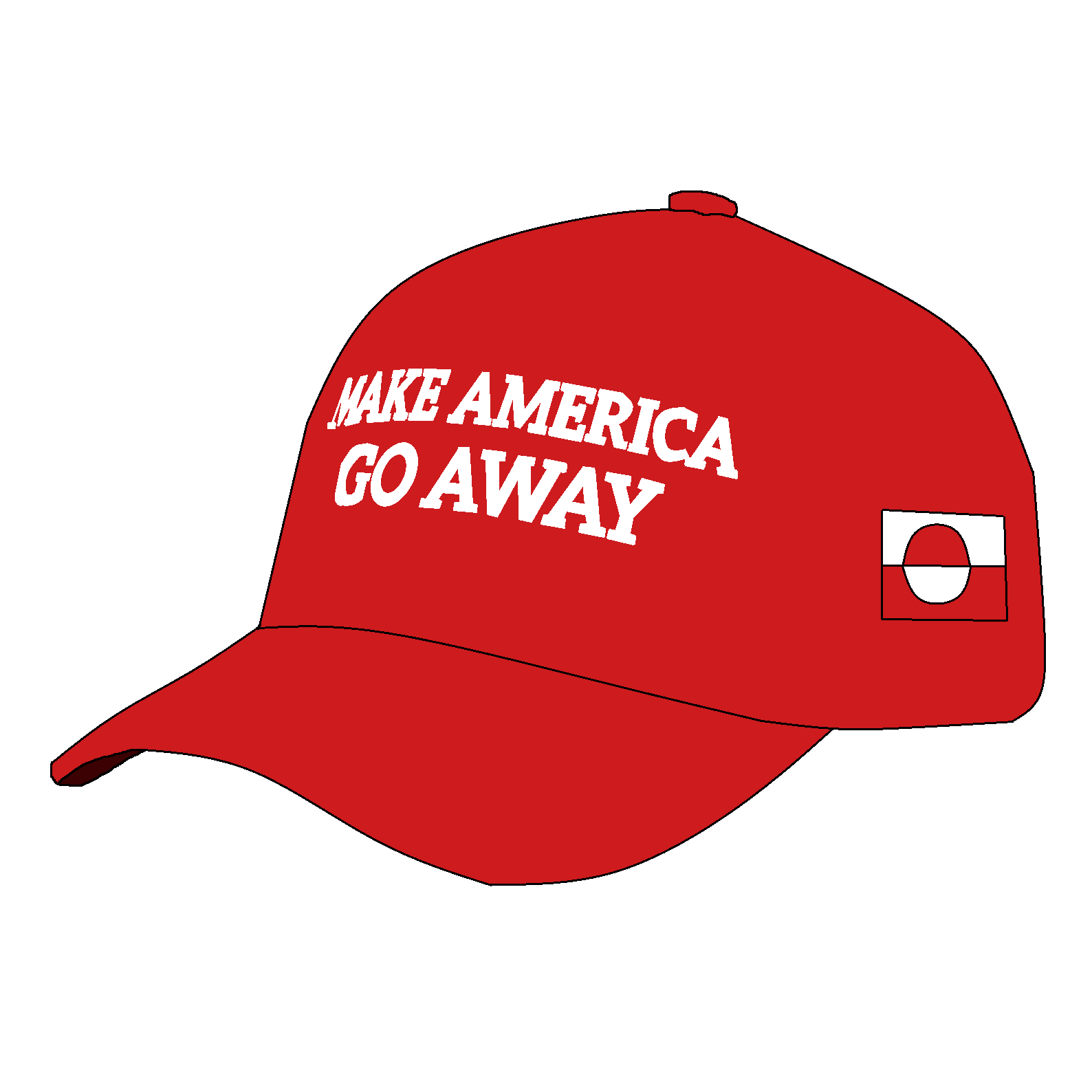
”Make America Go Away” hat

Hats which mimicked the red pro-Trump MAGA hats by replacing it with "Make America Go Away", one of the slogans adopted during the protests, and the slogan "Nu det NUUK!" (a pun on the Danish phrase nu er det nok ["enough is enough"], substituting nok with Nuuk) were sold out multiple times in the days following the protest.

Following the protests, these hats became a popular and widespread anti-American and anti-Trump symbol in Denmark and in Greenland. Some caps also read "No Means No" and "Make America Smart Again". They were also popular outside of Greenland and Denmark; indeed, an even higher number of hats were purchased in America itself.

== Aftermath ==
At the time of the protests, bipartisan delegation from the US Congress was in Copenhagen; delegation leader Chris Coons called the efforts to annex Greenland misguided. Jens Kjeldsen, a 70-year-old retired judge from Nuuk, also started to stage daily solo protests in the early morning in front of the local U.S. consulate following the protests.

On 19 January, the Legislative Assembly of Nunavut raised the flag of Greenland in front of its building there, in an event attended by dozens of people. Politicians that participated included John Main, Navarana Beveridge (Denmark's honorary consul in the city) and David Joanasie.

== See also ==
- Danish Defence
- Joint Arctic Command
- Military in Greenland
