= List of mammals of Greenland =

This is a list of the native wild mammal species recorded in Greenland. There are 26 mammal species native to Greenland, of which none are critically endangered, three are endangered, three are vulnerable, two are near threatened and four are data deficient. Only seven of these species are fully terrestrial. Introduced species (e.g., the house mouse and brown rat) are not included.

The following tags are used to highlight each species' conservation status as assessed by the International Union for Conservation of Nature; those on the left are used here, those on the right in some other articles:

EX	EX	Extinct	No reasonable doubt that the last individual has died.
EW	EW	Extinct in the wild	Known only to survive in captivity or as a naturalized population well outside its historic range.
CR	CR	Critically endangered	The species is in imminent danger of extinction in the wild.
EN	EN	Endangered	The species is facing a very high risk of extinction in the wild.
VU	VU	Vulnerable	The species is facing a high risk of extinction in the wild.
NT	NT	Near threatened	The species does not qualify as being at high risk of extinction but is likely to do so in the future.
LC	LC	Least concern	The species is not currently at risk of extinction in the wild.
DD	DD	Data deficient	There is inadequate information to assess the risk of extinction for this species.
NE	NE	Not evaluated	The conservation status of the species has not been studied.

== Order: Rodentia (rodents) ==
Rodents make up the largest order of mammals, with over 40% of mammalian species. They have two incisors in the upper and lower jaw which grow continually and must be kept short by gnawing. Most rodents are small though the capybara can weigh up to 45 kg (99 lb).

- Suborder: Myomorpha
  - Family: Cricetidae
    - Subfamily: Arvicolinae
      - Genus: Dicrostonyx
        - Northern collared lemming, Dicrostonyx groenlandicus LC

== Order: Lagomorpha (lagomorphs) ==
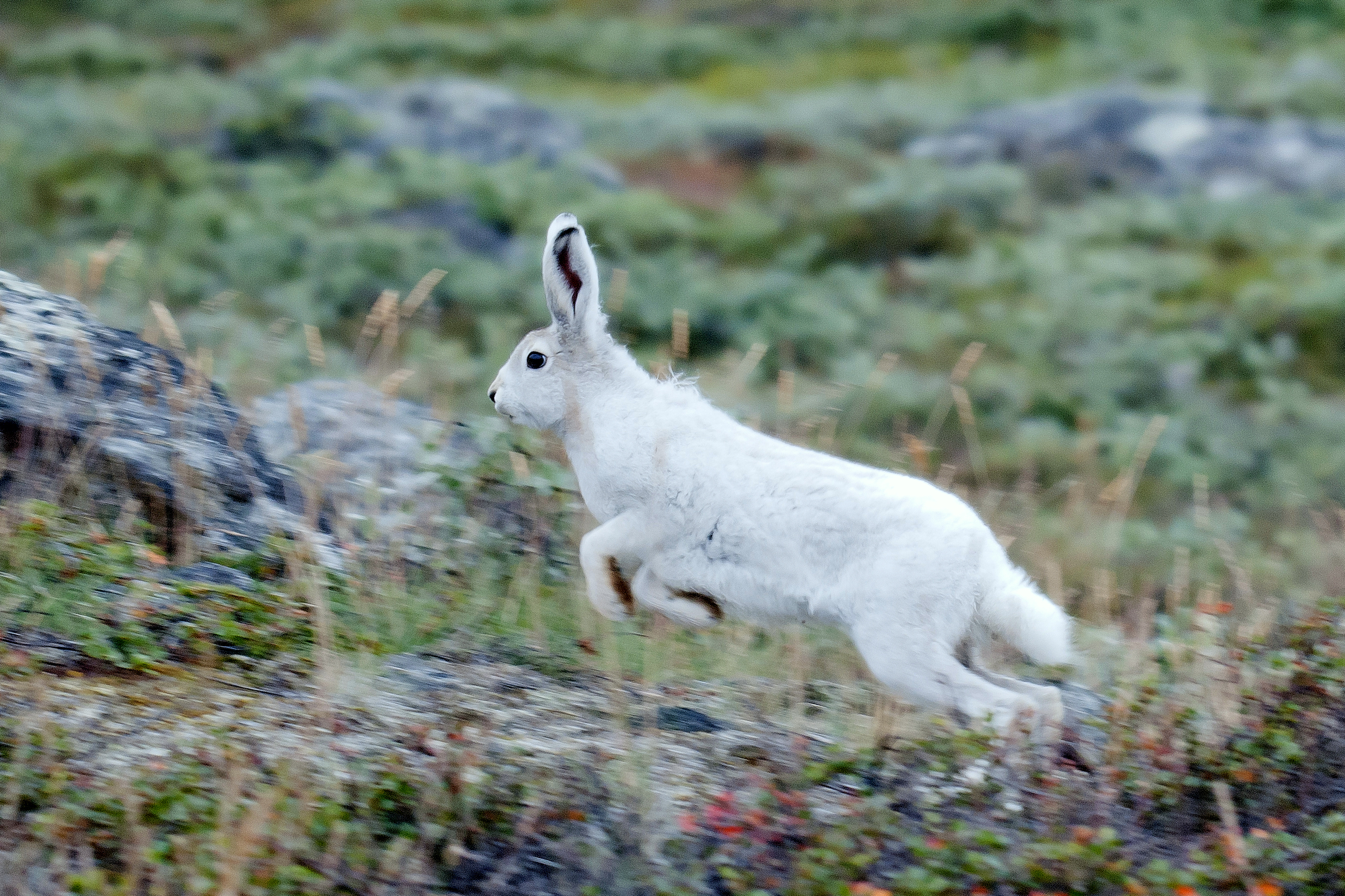
Arctic hare

The lagomorphs comprise two families, Leporidae (hares and rabbits), and Ochotonidae (pikas). Though they can resemble rodents, and were classified as a superfamily in that order until the early 20th century, they have since been considered a separate order. They differ from rodents in a number of physical characteristics, such as having four incisors in the upper jaw rather than two.

- Family: Leporidae (rabbits, hares)
  - Genus: Lepus
    - Arctic hare, Lepus arcticus LC
      - Greenland Arctic hare, L. a. groenlandicus

== Order: Carnivora (carnivorans) ==
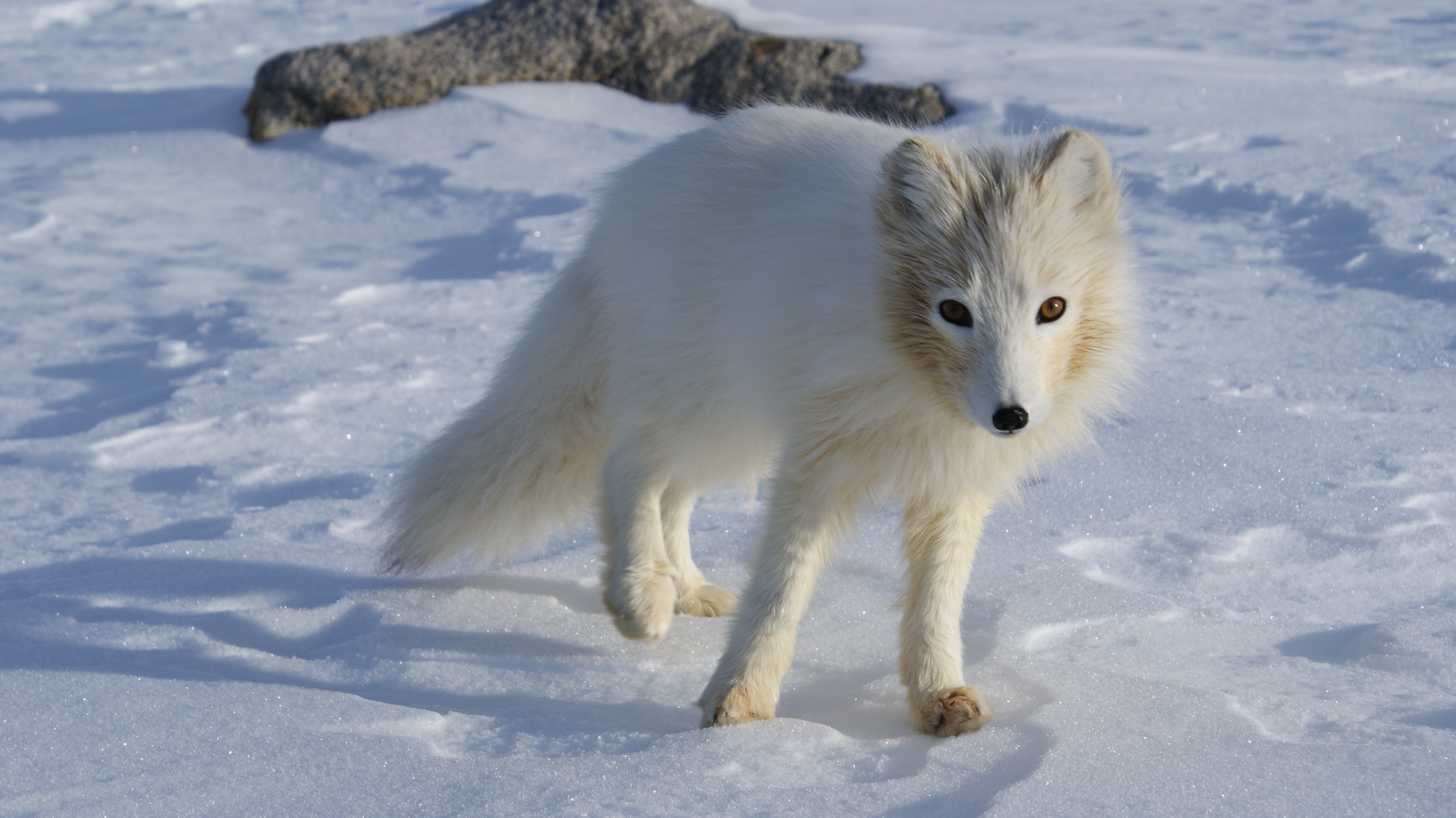
Arctic fox

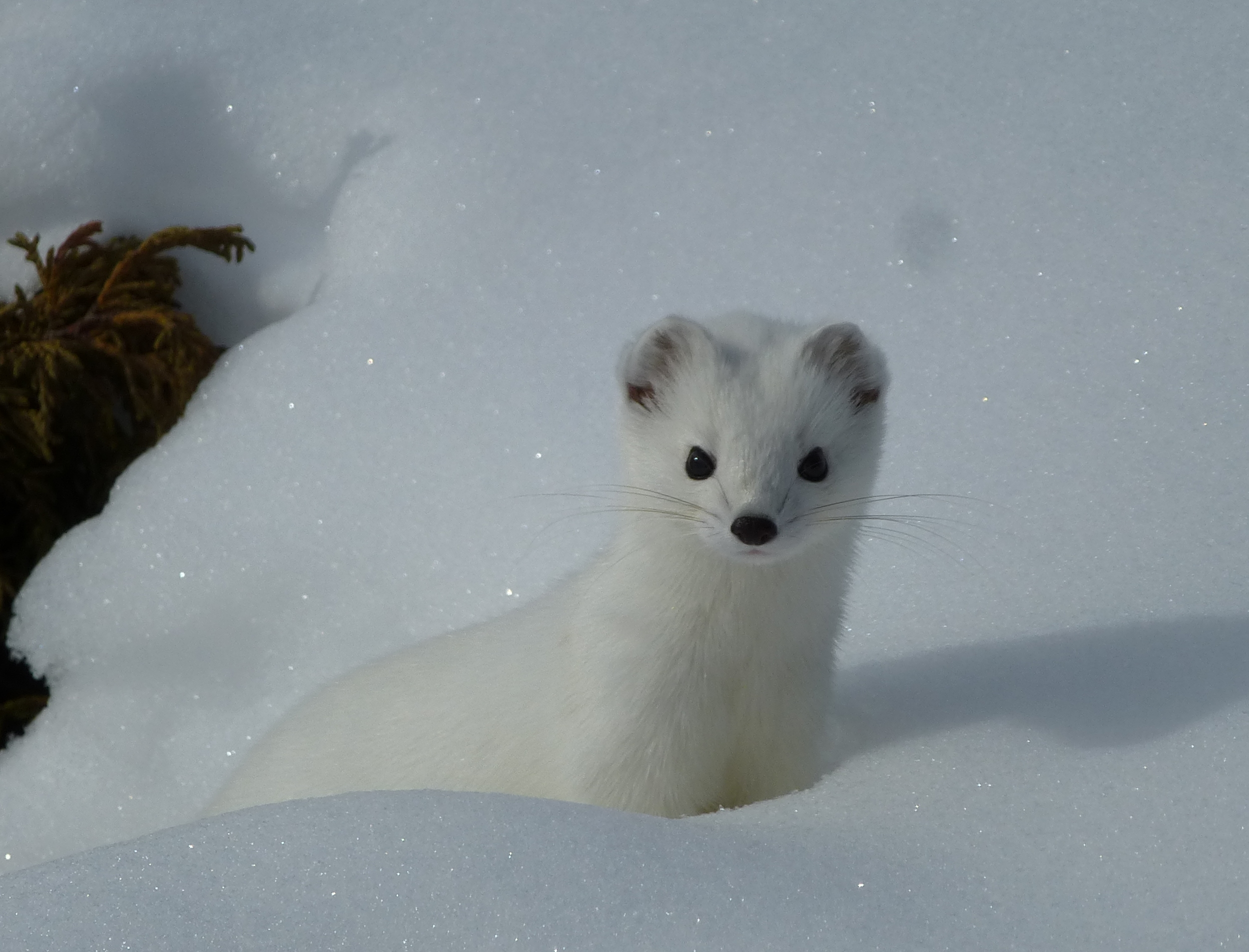
Ermine

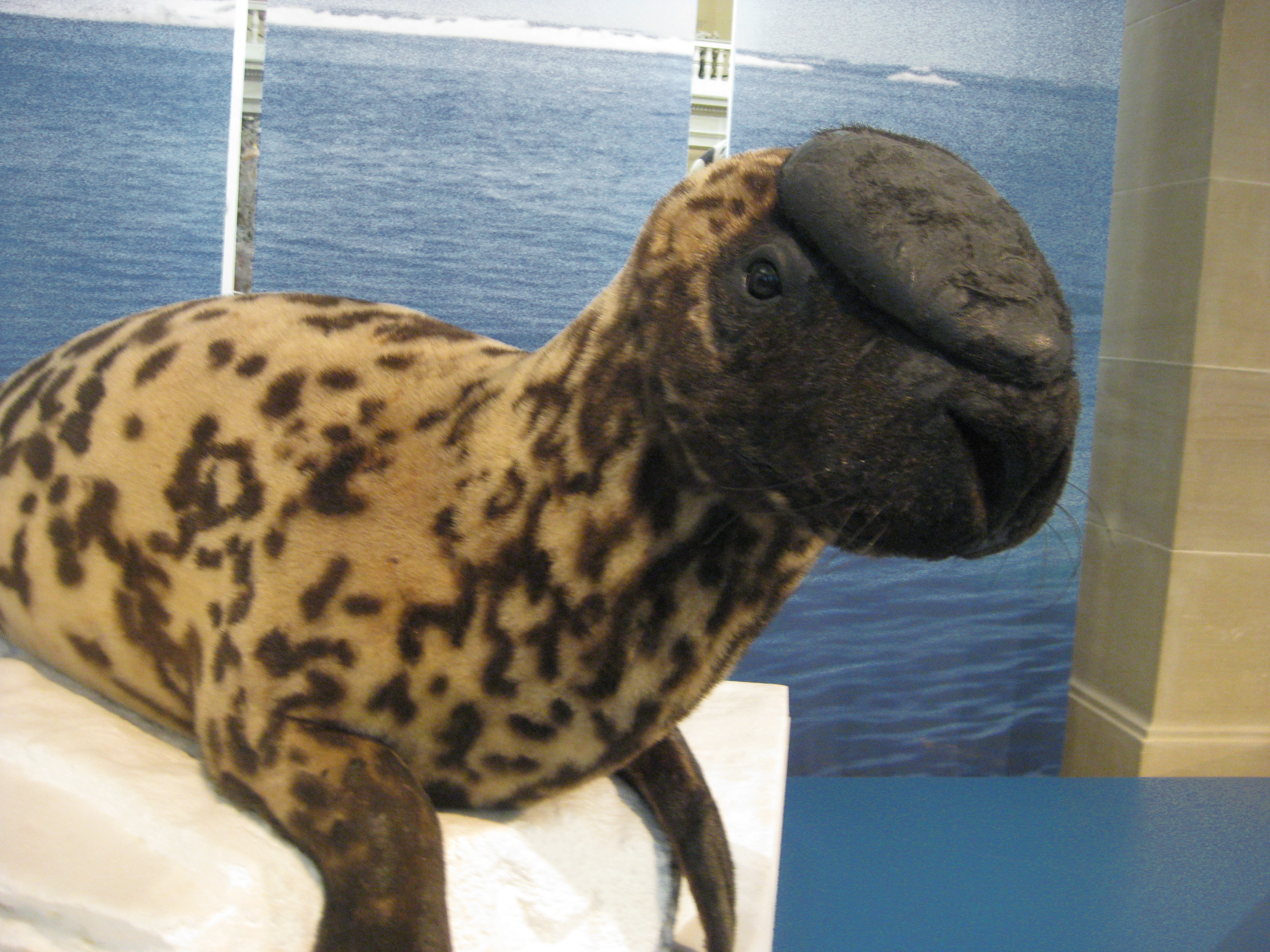
Hooded seal

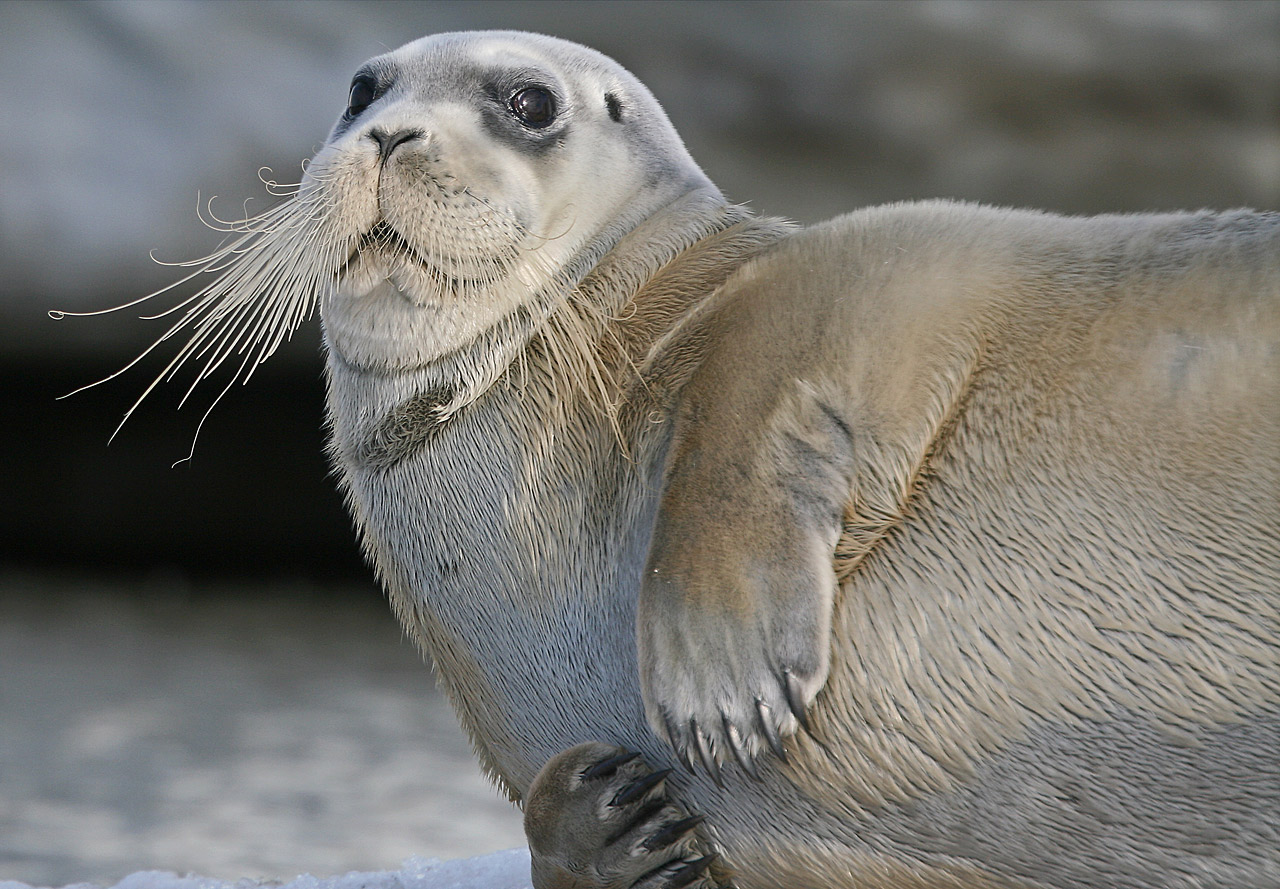
Bearded seal

There are over 260 species of carnivorans, the majority of which eat meat as their primary dietary item. They have a characteristic skull shape and dentition. Except for walruses and harbor seals, the pinnipeds of Greenland breed on pack ice or shore-fast ice. Walruses are the only local pinniped species to commonly consume warm-blooded prey.

- Suborder: Caniformia
  - Family: Canidae (dogs, foxes)
    - Genus: Vulpes
      - Arctic fox, Vulpes lagopus LC
        - Greenland Arctic fox, V. l. foragorapusis
    - Genus: Canis
      - Gray wolf, Canis lupus LC
        - Greenland wolf, C. l. orion
  - Family: Ursidae (bears)
    - Genus: Ursus
      - Polar bear, Ursus maritimus VU
  - Family: Mustelidae (weasels and relatives)
    - Genus: Mustela
      - Beringian ermine, Mustela erminea LC
  - Clade Pinnipedia (seals, sea lions and walruses)
    - Family: Odobenidae
      - Genus: Odobenus
        - Walrus, Odobenus rosmarus VU
    - Family: Phocidae (earless seals)
      - Genus: Cystophora
        - Hooded seal, Cystophora cristata VU
      - Genus: Erignathus
        - Bearded seal, Erignathus barbatus LC
      - Genus: Pagophilus
        - Harp seal, Pagophilus groenlandicus LC
      - Genus: Phoca
        - Harbor seal, Phoca vitulina LC
      - Genus: Pusa
        - Ringed seal, Pusa hispida LC

== Order: Artiodactyla (even-toed ungulates and cetaceans) ==
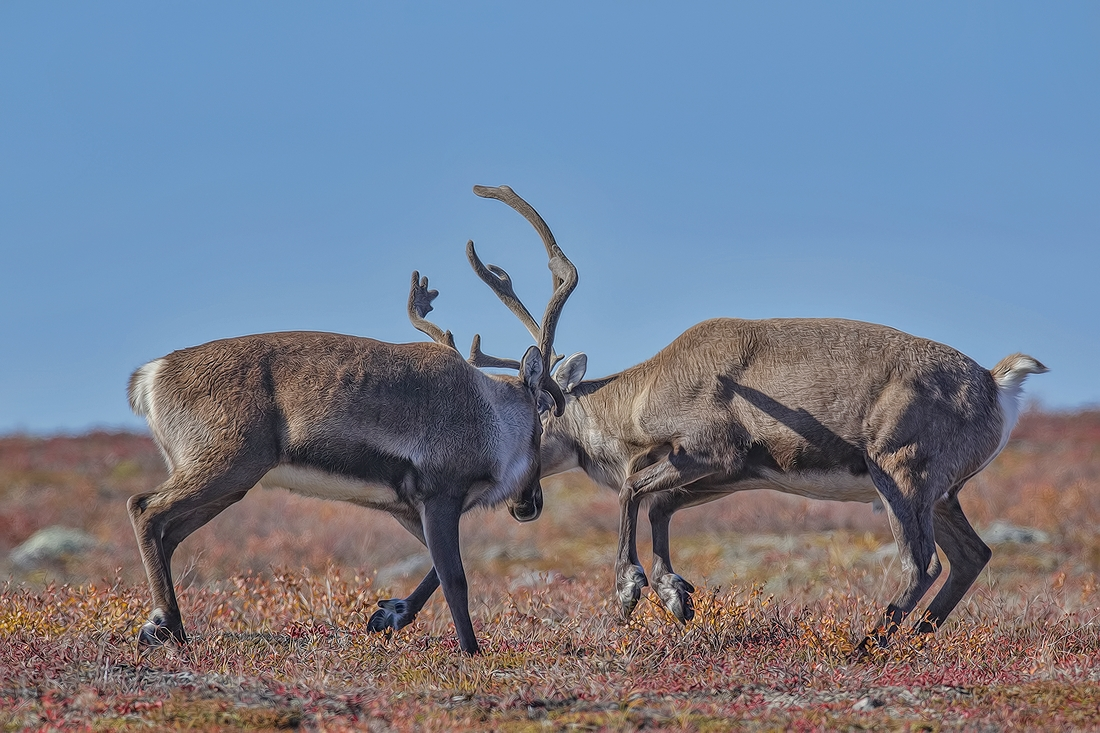
Barren-ground caribou rutting

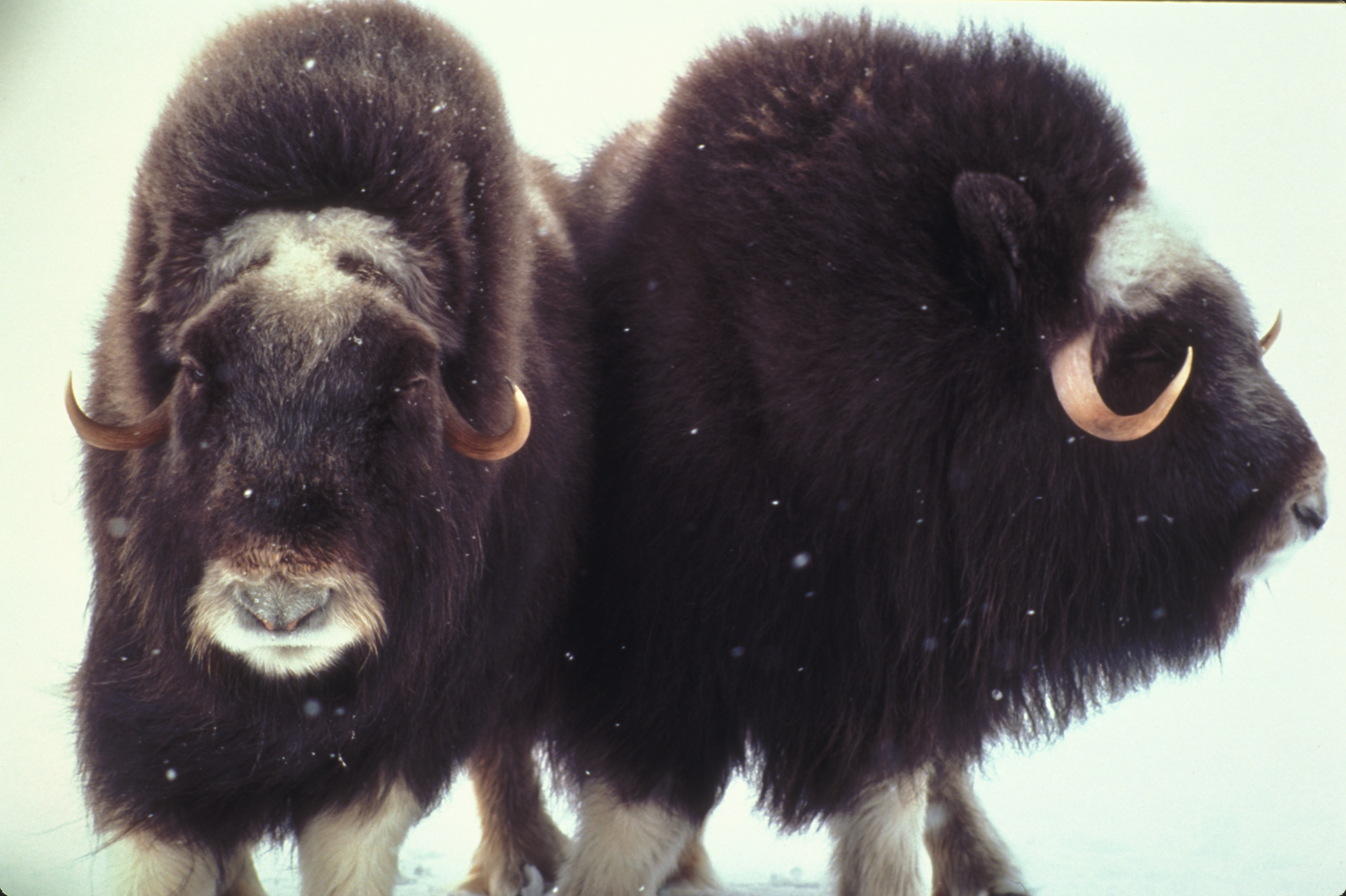
Muskox

The even-toed ungulates are ungulates whose weight is borne about equally by the third and fourth toes, rather than mostly or entirely by the third as in perissodactyls. There are about 220 noncetacean artiodactyl species, including many that are of great economic importance to humans. Reindeer hunting in Greenland has both cultural and economic significance.

- Family: Cervidae (deer)
  - Subfamily: Capreolinae
    - Genus: Rangifer
      - Caribou, Rangifer tarandus VU
        - Barren-ground caribou, R. t. groenlandicus
        - Peary caribou, R. t. pearyi (?)
- Family: Bovidae (cattle, antelope, sheep, goats)
  - Subfamily: Caprinae
    - Genus: Ovibos
      - Muskox, Ovibos moschatus LC

== Order: Cetacea (whales, dolphins and porpoises) ==
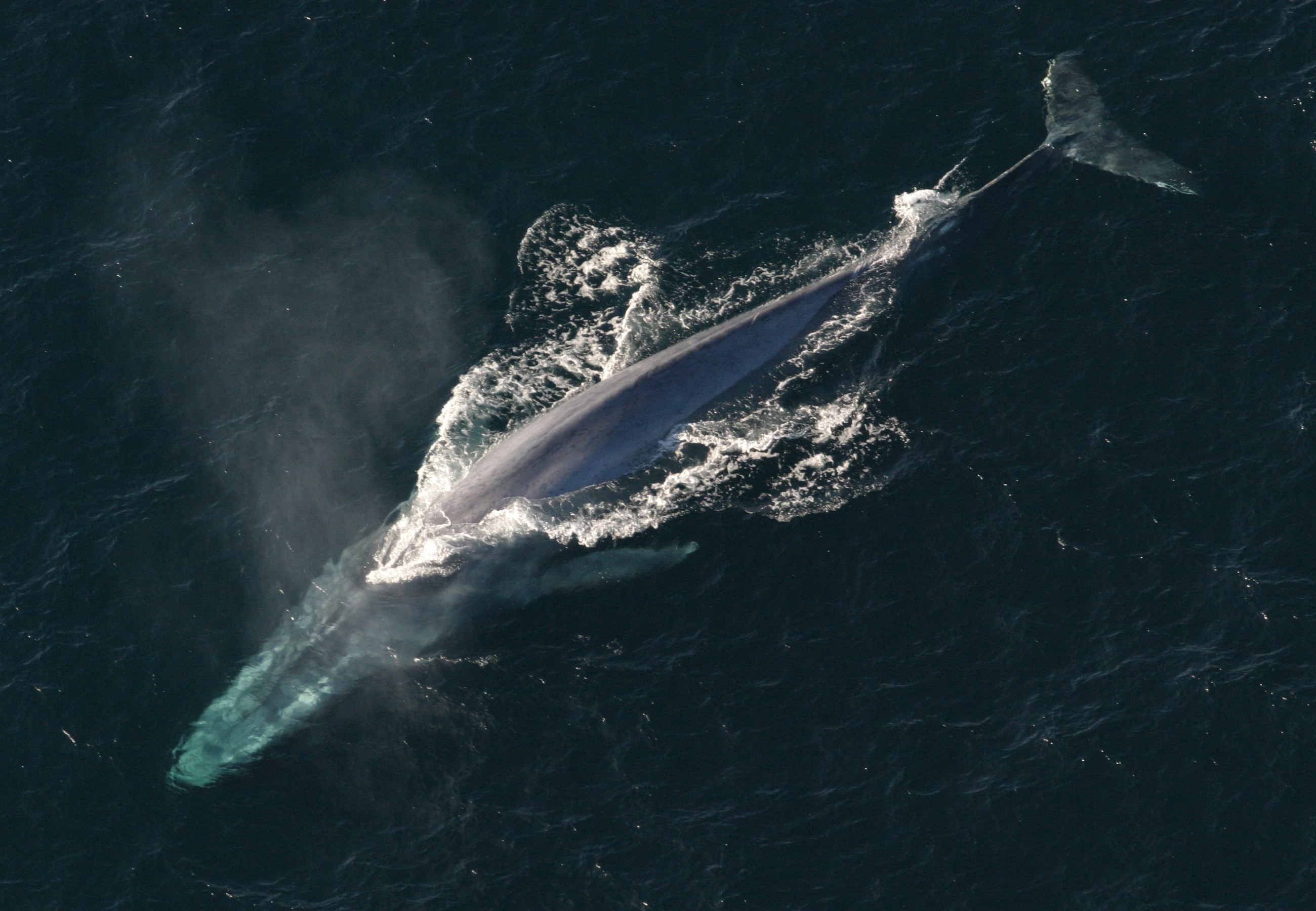
Blue whale

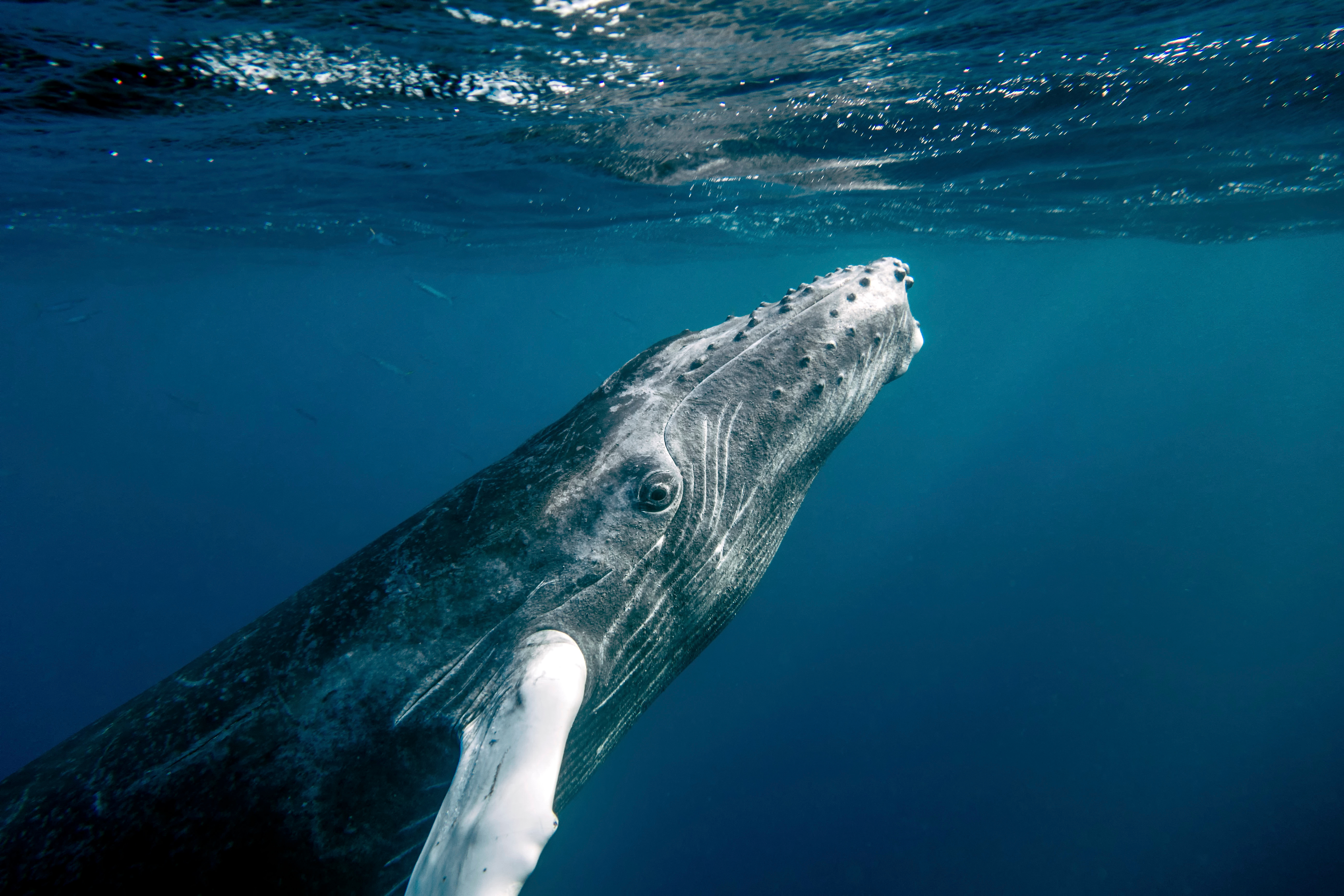
Humpback whale

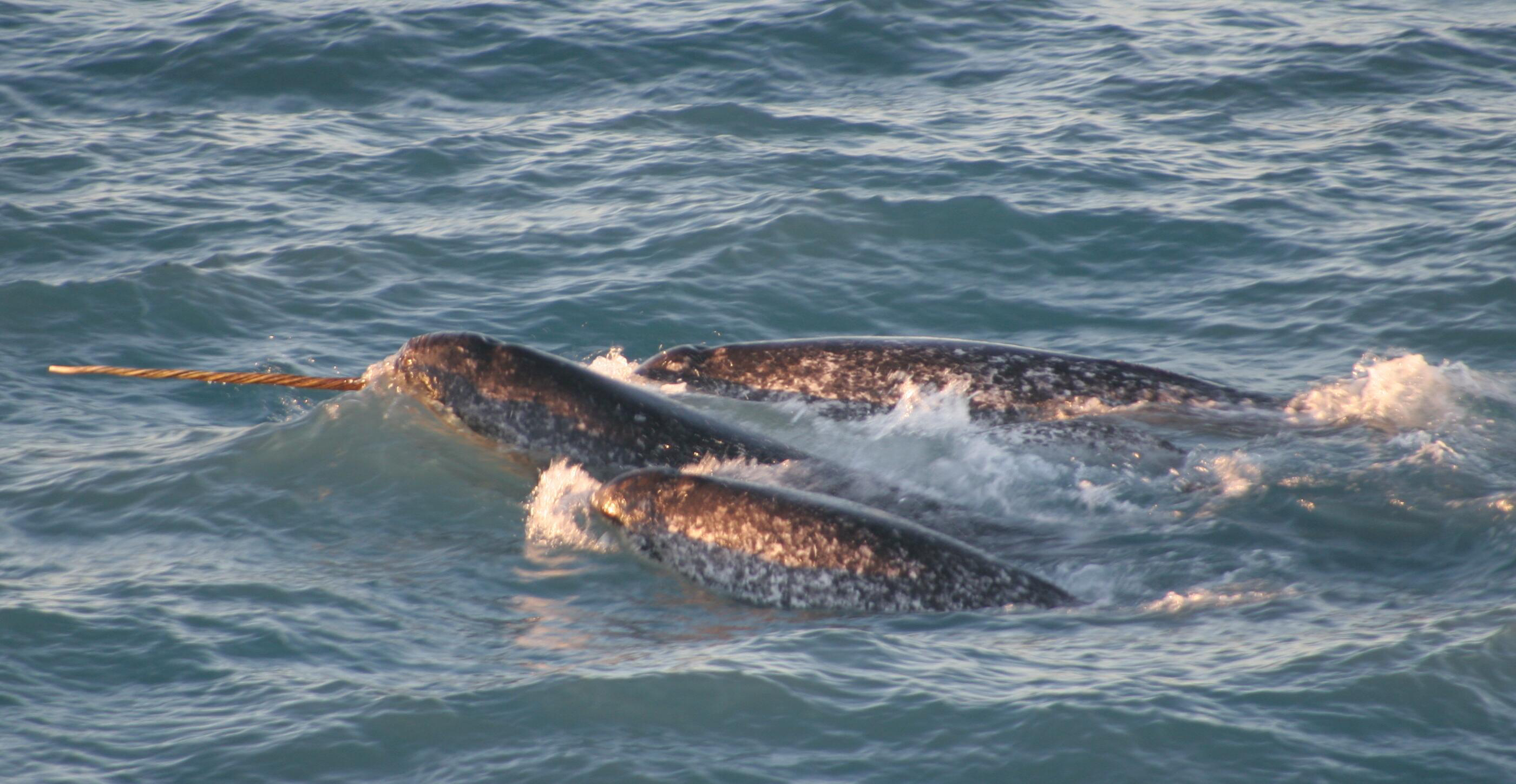
A pod of narwhals

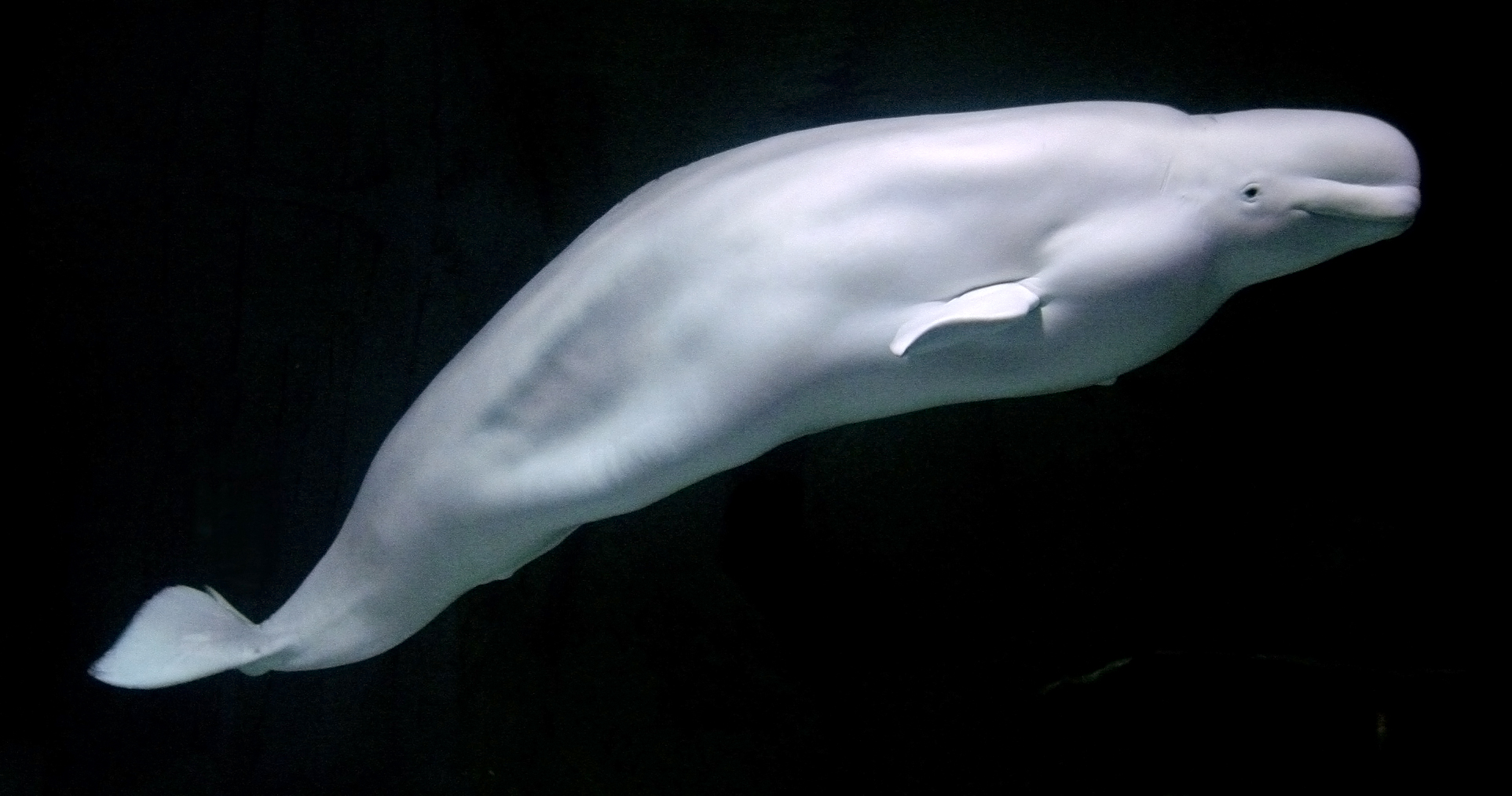
Beluga

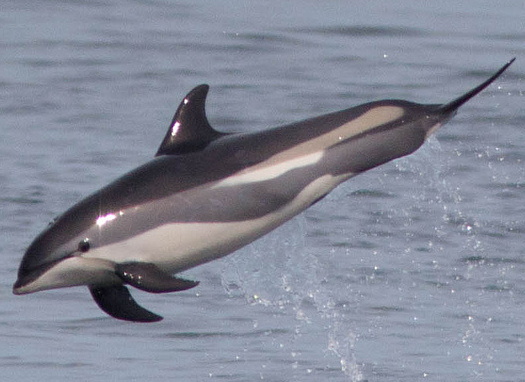
Atlantic white-sided dolphin

Orcas

The infraorder Cetacea includes whales, dolphins and porpoises. They are the mammals most fully adapted to aquatic life with a spindle-shaped nearly hairless body, protected by a thick layer of blubber, and forelimbs and tail modified to provide propulsion underwater. Their closest extant relatives are the hippos, which are artiodactyls, from which cetaceans descended; cetaceans are thus also artiodactyls.

- Parvorder: Mysticeti
  - Family: Balaenidae
    - Genus: Balaena
      - Bowhead whale, Balaena mysticetus LC
    - Genus: Eubalaena
      - North Atlantic right whale, Eubalaena glacialis CR
  - Family: Balaenopteridae
    - Subfamily: Balaenopterinae
      - Genus: Balaenoptera
        - Northern minke whale, Balaenoptera acutorostrata LC
          - North Atlantic minke whale, B. a. acutorostrata
        - Blue whale, Balaenoptera musculus EN
          - Northern blue whale, B. m. musculus
        - Fin whale, Balaenoptera physalus VU
          - Northern fin whale, B. p. physalus
    - Subfamily: Megapterinae
      - Genus: Megaptera
        - Humpback whale, Megaptera novaeangliae LC
- Parvorder: Odontoceti
  - Superfamily: Platanistoidea
    - Family: Monodontidae
      - Genus: Monodon
        - Narwhal, Monodon monoceros LC
      - Genus: Delphinapterus
        - Beluga, Delphinapterus leucas LC
    - Family: Phocoenidae
      - Genus: Phocoena
        - Harbour porpoise, Phocoena phocoena LC
          - North Atlantic harbour porpoise, P. p. phocoena
    - Family: Physeteridae
      - Genus: Physeter
        - Sperm whale, Physeter macrocephalus VU
    - Family: Ziphidae
      - Subfamily: Hyperoodontinae
        - Genus: Hyperoodon
          - Northern bottlenose whale, Hyperoodon ampullatus DD
    - Family: Delphinidae (marine dolphins)
      - Genus: Lagenorhynchus
        - White-beaked dolphin, Lagenorhynchus albirostris LC
        - Atlantic white-sided dolphin, Lagenorhynchus acutus LC
      - Genus: Tursiops
        - Common bottlenose dolphin, Tursiops truncatus LC
          - Atlantic bottlenose dolphin, T. t. truncatus
      - Genus: Stenella
        - Striped dolphin, Stenella coeruleoalba LC
      - Genus: Orcinus
        - Orca, Orcinus orca DD
      - Genus: Globicephala
        - Long-finned pilot whale, Globicephala melas LC

== See also ==
- Flora and fauna of Greenland
- List of chordate orders
- Lists of mammals by region
- List of prehistoric mammals
- Mammal classification
- List of mammals described in the 2000s

== Lists of Western Hemisphere mammals from north to south ==
List of mammals of Mexico
List of mammals of Antarctica
