= Climate of Greenland =

Köppen–Geiger climate classification map at 1-km resolution for Greenland 1991–2020

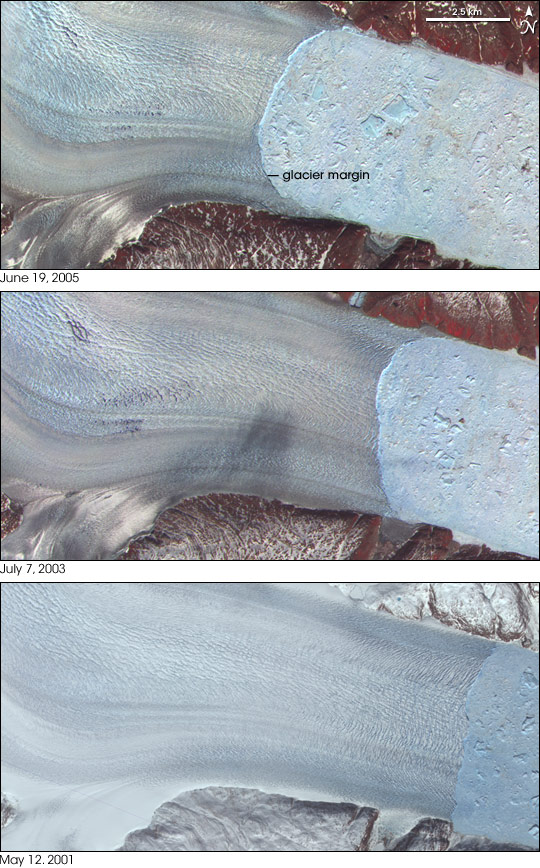
Retreat of the Helheim Glacier, Greenland

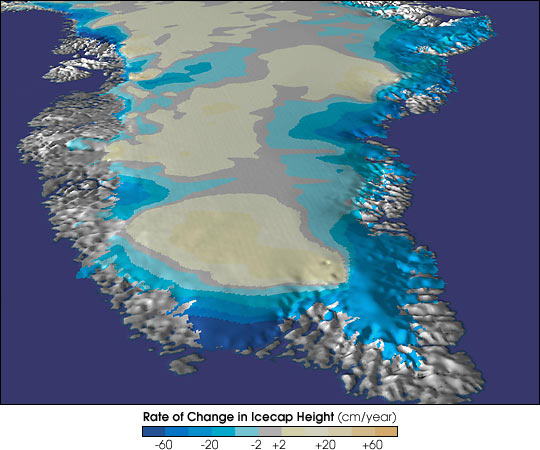
Map of Greenland's rate of change in ice sheet height

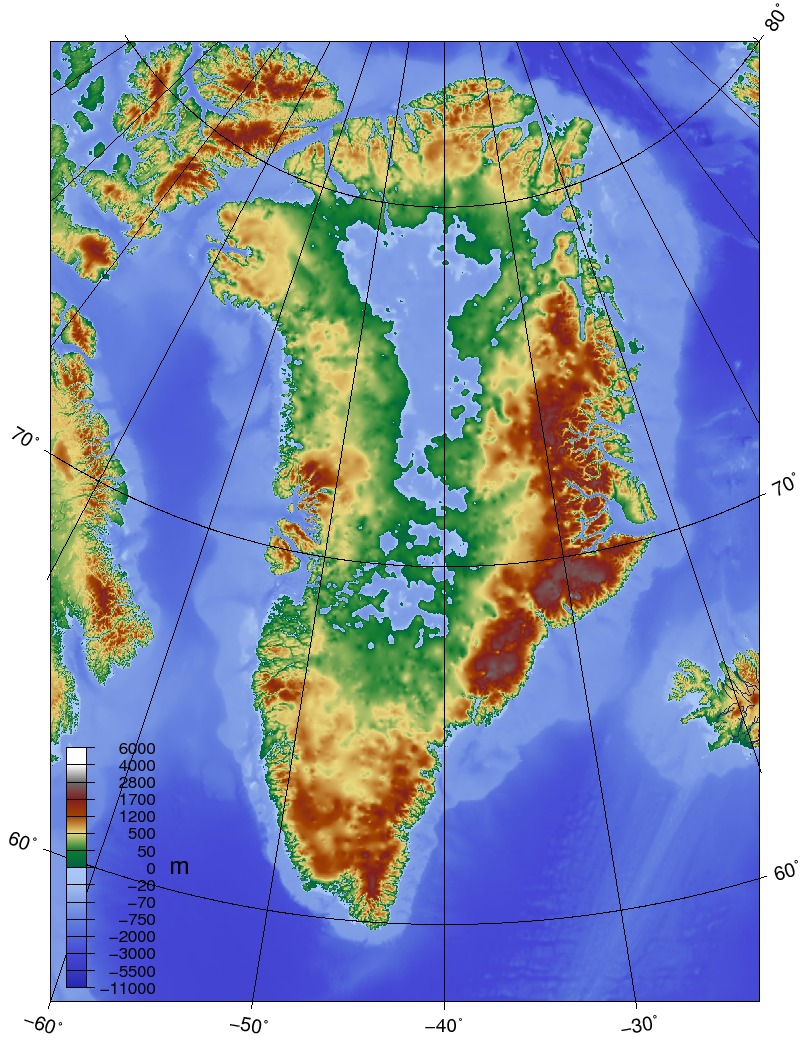
Map of Greenland bedrock

Greenland's climate is a tundra climate (Köppen ET) on and near the coasts and an ice cap climate (Köppen EF) in inland areas. It typically has short, cool summers and long, moderately cold winters.

Gulf Stream influences make Greenland's winter temperatures very mild for its latitude. In Nuuk, the capital, average winter temperatures are only −9 °C (16 °F). In comparison, the average winter temperatures for Iqaluit, Nunavut, Canada, are around −27 °C (−17 °F). Conversely, summer temperatures are very low, with an average high around 10 °C (50 °F). This is too low to sustain trees, and the land is treeless tundra.

On the Greenland ice sheet, the temperature is far below freezing throughout the year, and record high temperatures have peaked only slightly above freezing. The record high temperature at Summit Camp is 2.2 °C (36.0 °F).

In the far south of Greenland, there is a very small forest in the Qinngua Valley, where summer temperatures are barely high enough to sustain trees. There are mountains over 1,500 metres (4,900 ft) high surrounding the valley, which protect it from cold, fast winds travelling across the ice sheet. It is the only natural forest in Greenland and is only 15 kilometres (9.3 mi) long.

== Climate change ==
The Greenland ice sheet is 3 kilometers (1.9 mi) thick and broad enough to blanket an area the size of Mexico. The ice is so massive that its weight presses the bedrock of Greenland below sea level and is so all-concealing that not until recently did scientists discover Greenland's Grand Canyon or the possibility that Greenland might actually be three islands.

If the ice melted, the interior bedrock below sea level would be covered by water. It is not clear whether this water would be at sea level or a lake above sea level. If it would be at sea level it could connect to the sea at Ilulissat Icefjord, in Baffin Bay and near Nordostrundingen, creating three large islands. But it is most likely that it would be a lake with one drain.

It is thought that before the last Ice Age, Greenland had mountainous edges and a lowland (and probably very dry) center which drained to the sea via one big river flowing out westwards, past where Disko Island is now.

There is concern about sea level rise caused by ice loss (melt and glaciers falling into the sea) on Greenland. Between 1997 and 2003 ice loss was 68–92 km^{3}/a (16–22 cu mi/a), compared to about 60 km^{3}/a (14 cu mi/a) for 1993/4-1998/9. Half of the increase was from higher summer melting, with the rest caused by the movements of some glaciers exceeding the speeds needed to balance upstream snow accumulation. A complete loss of ice on Greenland would cause a sea level rise of as much as 6.40 meters (21.0 ft).

Researchers at NASA's Jet Propulsion Laboratory and the University of Kansas reported in February 2006 that the glaciers are melting twice as fast as they were five years ago. By 2005, Greenland was beginning to lose more ice volume than anyone expected – an annual loss of up to 52 cubic miles or 217 cubic kilometres per year, according to more recent satellite gravity measurements released by JPL. The increased ice loss may be partially offset by increased snow accumulation due to increased precipitation.

Between 1991 and 2006, monitoring of the weather at one location (Swiss Camp) found that the average winter temperature had risen almost 10 °F (5.6 °C).

Recently, Greenland's three largest outlet glaciers have started moving faster, satellite data show. These are the Jacobshavn Isbræ at Ilulissat on the western edge of Greenland, and the Kangerdlugssuaq and Helheim glaciers on the eastern edge of Greenland. The two latter accelerated greatly during the years 2004–2005, but returned to pre-2004 velocities in 2006. The accelerating ice flow has been accompanied by a dramatic increase in seismic activity. In March 2006, researchers at Harvard University and the Lamont–Doherty Earth Observatory at Columbia University reported that the glaciers now generate swarms of earthquakes up to magnitude 5.0.

The retreat of Greenland's ice is revealing islands that were thought to be part of the mainland. In September 2005 Dennis Schmitt discovered an island 400 miles (644 km) north of the Arctic Circle in eastern Greenland which he named Uunartoq Qeqertaq, Inuit for "warming island".

=== Future projections ===
In the Arctic, temperatures are rising faster than anywhere else in the world. Greenland is losing 200 billion tonnes of ice per year. Research suggests that this could increase the sea levels' rise by 30 centimeters by the end of the century. These projections have the possibility of changing as satellite data only dates back to 40 years ago. This means that researchers must view old photographs of glaciers and compare them to ones taken today to determine the future of Greenland's ice.

== Climate data ==
=== Temperature extremes ===
Climate data for Greenland
Month	Jan	Feb	Mar	Apr	May	Jun	Jul	Aug	Sep	Oct	Nov	Dec	Year
Record high °C (°F)	15.3 (59.5)	16.0 (60.8)	16.0 (60.8)	19.1 (66.4)	24.8 (76.6)	30.1 (86.2)	26.3 (79.3)	25.2 (77.4)	24.9 (76.8)	19.3 (66.7)	21.6 (70.9)	15.9 (60.6)	30.1 (86.2)
Record low °C (°F)	−66.1 (−87.0)	−66.1 (−87.0)	−67.2 (−89.0)	−58.0 (−72.4)	−49.0 (−56.2)	−37.5 (−35.5)	−33.0 (−27.4)	−39.2 (−38.6)	−46.0 (−50.8)	−56.0 (−68.8)	−60.0 (−76.0)	−69.6 (−93.3)	−69.6 (−93.3)
Source 1: Weather Extremes Greenland (all record lows except for Jan, Mar, May, Dec)(Jan and Feb record highs), Meteo Climat (Mar-Dec highs)
Source 2: Georgi, Johannes (1935), Eismitte record low, PANGAEA - Data Publisher for Earth & Environmental Science, doi:10.1594/PANGAEA.604003 (March record low), May record low at Summit (May record low), WUnderground (record low all time)

==== Highest temperatures ====
Month	Temperature	Date	Location
January	15.3 °C (59.5 °F)	29 January 2003	Nuuk, Sermersooq
February	16.0 °C (60.8 °F)	20 February 2005	Nanortailak, Kujalleq
March	16.0 °C (60.8 °F)	31 March 1975	Narsarsuaq, Kujalleq
April	19.1 °C (66.4 °F)	26 April 2016	Narsarsuaq, Kujalleq
May	24.8 °C (76.6 °F)	29 May 2012	Narsarsuaq, Kujalleq
June	30.1 °C (86.2 °F)	23 June 1915	Ivittuut, Sermersooq
July	26.3 °C (79.3 °F)	6 July 2008	Nuuk, Sermersooq
August	25.2 °C (77.4 °F)	3 August 1899	Tasiilaq, Sermersooq
September	24.9 °C (76.8 °F)	2 September 2010	Nuuk, Sermersooq
October	19.3 °C (66.7 °F)	5 October 2016	Tasiilaq, Sermersooq
November	21.6 °C (70.9 °F)	21 November 2015	Tasiilaq, Sermersooq
December	15.9 °C (60.6 °F)	21 December 2001	Narsarsuaq, Kujalleq

==== Lowest temperatures ====
Month	Temperature	Date	Location
January	−66.1 °C (−87.0 °F)	9 January 1954	North Ice, Northeast Greenland
February	−66.1 °C (−87.0 °F)	21 February 1950	Eismitte, Northeast Greenland
March	−67.2 °C (−89.0 °F)	18 March 2011	Summit Camp Station, Northeast Greenland
April	−58.0 °C (−72.4 °F)	1931	Eismitte, Northeast Greenland
May	−49.0 °C (−56.2 °F)	9 May 2018	Summit Camp Station, Northeast Greenland
June	−37.5 °C (−35.5 °F)	1 June 2011	Summit Camp Station, Northeast Greenland
July	−33.0 °C (−27.4 °F)	4 July 2017	Summit Camp Station, Northeast Greenland
August	−39.2 °C (−38.6 °F)	29 August 2004	Summit Camp Station, Northeast Greenland
September	−46.0 °C (−50.8 °F)	24 September 2009	Summit Camp Station, Northeast Greenland
October	−56.0 °C (−68.8 °F)	1930	Eismitte, Northeast Greenland
November	−60.0 °C (−76.0 °F)	26 November 2001	Summit Camp Station, Northeast Greenland
December	−69.6 °C (−93.3 °F)	22 December 1991	Klinck Station, Northeast Greenland

=== Towns ===
Climate data for Nuuk (Köppen ET)
Month	Jan	Feb	Mar	Apr	May	Jun	Jul	Aug	Sep	Oct	Nov	Dec	Year
Record high °C (°F)	15.3 (59.5)	13.0 (55.4)	15.2 (59.4)	14.6 (58.3)	18.3 (64.9)	23.8 (74.8)	26.3 (79.3)	25.1 (77.2)	23.8 (74.8)	19.9 (67.8)	15.8 (60.4)	13.3 (55.9)	26.3 (79.3)
Mean daily maximum °C (°F)	−5.0 (23.0)	−6.0 (21.2)	−5.1 (22.8)	−0.7 (30.7)	3.9 (39.0)	8.4 (47.1)	11.1 (52.0)	10.2 (50.4)	6.5 (43.7)	2.3 (36.1)	−1.1 (30.0)	−3.2 (26.2)	1.8 (35.2)
Daily mean °C (°F)	−7.5 (18.5)	−8.6 (16.5)	−7.7 (18.1)	−3.0 (26.6)	1.2 (34.2)	5.0 (41.0)	7.4 (45.3)	7.0 (44.6)	4.0 (39.2)	0.2 (32.4)	−3.3 (26.1)	−5.5 (22.1)	−0.9 (30.4)
Mean daily minimum °C (°F)	−9.7 (14.5)	−10.9 (12.4)	−10.0 (14.0)	−5.2 (22.6)	−1.2 (29.8)	2.0 (35.6)	4.4 (39.9)	4.5 (40.1)	2.0 (35.6)	−1.8 (28.8)	−5.3 (22.5)	−7.7 (18.1)	−3.3 (26.1)
Record low °C (°F)	−32.5 (−26.5)	−29.6 (−21.3)	−27.5 (−17.5)	−30.0 (−22.0)	−19.0 (−2.2)	−10.3 (13.5)	−6.6 (20.1)	−4.7 (23.5)	−8.2 (17.2)	−16.6 (2.1)	−24.4 (−11.9)	−25.2 (−13.4)	−32.5 (−26.5)
Average precipitation mm (inches)	67.1 (2.64)	51.1 (2.01)	58.9 (2.32)	53.3 (2.10)	57.4 (2.26)	61.7 (2.43)	69.3 (2.73)	90.8 (3.57)	104.6 (4.12)	80.5 (3.17)	79.0 (3.11)	74.5 (2.93)	852.6 (33.57)
Average precipitation days (≥ 0.1 mm)	13.8	12.7	15.1	13.2	13.0	10.5	12.5	12.5	14.1	13.5	14.3	14.4	159.6
Average snowy days	13.6	12.1	14.5	11.4	9.4	2.8	0.1	0.2	4.3	9.8	12.7	13.8	104.7
Average relative humidity (%)	73.8	74.7	74.3	78.3	81.1	85.0	85.3	86.7	82.3	76.7	73.3	73.4	78.7
Mean monthly sunshine hours	15.5	65.0	148.8	180.0	189.1	204.0	195.3	164.3	141.0	80.6	30.0	6.2	1,419.8
Mean daily sunshine hours	0.5	2.3	4.8	6.0	6.1	6.8	6.3	5.3	4.7	2.6	1.0	0.2	3.9
Source 1: Danish Meteorological Institute
Source 2: Meteo Climat (record highs and lows), Deutscher Wetterdienst (sun 1980–1990), NOAA (humidity 1991-2020)

Climate data for Kangerlussuaq (Köppen Dfc/ET/BSk)
Month	Jan	Feb	Mar	Apr	May	Jun	Jul	Aug	Sep	Oct	Nov	Dec	Year
Record high °C (°F)	12.3 (54.1)	13.9 (57.0)	14.4 (57.9)	17.8 (64.0)	22.4 (72.3)	25.2 (77.4)	26.6 (79.9)	22.9 (73.2)	21.1 (70.0)	17.1 (62.8)	15.8 (60.4)	11.9 (53.4)	26.6 (79.9)
Mean daily maximum °C (°F)	−13.5 (7.7)	−14.8 (5.4)	−10.8 (12.6)	−0.9 (30.4)	8.4 (47.1)	15.3 (59.5)	16.8 (62.2)	14.0 (57.2)	7.7 (45.9)	−0.8 (30.6)	−7.0 (19.4)	−10.5 (13.1)	0.3 (32.6)
Daily mean °C (°F)	−18.5 (−1.3)	−19.8 (−3.6)	−16.6 (2.1)	−6.2 (20.8)	3.6 (38.5)	10.0 (50.0)	11.2 (52.2)	8.7 (47.7)	3.5 (38.3)	−4.6 (23.7)	−11.3 (11.7)	−15.2 (4.6)	−4.6 (23.7)
Mean daily minimum °C (°F)	−23.3 (−9.9)	−24.9 (−12.8)	−22.2 (−8.0)	−11.6 (11.1)	−1.7 (28.9)	4.2 (39.6)	5.0 (41.0)	3.3 (37.9)	−1.0 (30.2)	−8.7 (16.3)	−15.7 (3.7)	−19.9 (−3.8)	−9.7 (14.5)
Record low °C (°F)	−47.2 (−53.0)	−46.8 (−52.2)	−45.4 (−49.7)	−34.4 (−29.9)	−21.8 (−7.2)	−4.7 (23.5)	−0.7 (30.7)	−4.8 (23.4)	−15.4 (4.3)	−29.7 (−21.5)	−36.3 (−33.3)	−45.5 (−49.9)	−47.2 (−53.0)
Average precipitation mm (inches)	7.9 (0.31)	6.1 (0.24)	5.2 (0.20)	7.6 (0.30)	10.9 (0.43)	13.4 (0.53)	27.6 (1.09)	31.7 (1.25)	22.7 (0.89)	13.1 (0.52)	11.7 (0.46)	9.8 (0.39)	167.7 (6.61)
Average precipitation days (≥ 1.0 mm)	2.9	2.0	1.7	2.3	2.8	3.4	5.2	6.9	5.2	3.8	3.9	3.2	43.3
Average relative humidity (%)	70.2	68.1	66.5	64.1	57.7	55.1	57.2	64.8	67.3	72.9	72.6	71.4	65.7
Source 1: Danish Meteorological Institute
Source 2: NOAA

Climate data for Narsarsuaq (Köppen Dfc/ET)
Month	Jan	Feb	Mar	Apr	May	Jun	Jul	Aug	Sep	Oct	Nov	Dec	Year
Record high °C (°F)	14.2 (57.6)	15.3 (59.5)	16.5 (61.7)	19.1 (66.4)	24.8 (76.6)	25.2 (77.4)	24.1 (75.4)	23.6 (74.5)	22.4 (72.3)	18.7 (65.7)	18.4 (65.1)	15.9 (60.6)	25.2 (77.4)
Mean daily maximum °C (°F)	−2.1 (28.2)	−2.6 (27.3)	−0.7 (30.7)	4.9 (40.8)	10.0 (50.0)	14.0 (57.2)	15.7 (60.3)	14.1 (57.4)	9.9 (49.8)	5.1 (41.2)	0.4 (32.7)	−1.6 (29.1)	5.6 (42.1)
Daily mean °C (°F)	−6.1 (21.0)	−6.5 (20.3)	−4.7 (23.5)	1.3 (34.3)	5.9 (42.6)	9.6 (49.3)	11.1 (52.0)	9.8 (49.6)	6.1 (43.0)	1.5 (34.7)	−3.3 (26.1)	−5.5 (22.1)	1.6 (34.9)
Mean daily minimum °C (°F)	−10.5 (13.1)	−11.1 (12.0)	−9.1 (15.6)	−2.6 (27.3)	1.6 (34.9)	5.1 (41.2)	6.7 (44.1)	5.8 (42.4)	2.3 (36.1)	−2.0 (28.4)	−7.3 (18.9)	−9.8 (14.4)	−2.6 (27.4)
Record low °C (°F)	−39.7 (−39.5)	−33.7 (−28.7)	−31.9 (−25.4)	−23.1 (−9.6)	−16.7 (1.9)	−2.9 (26.8)	0.1 (32.2)	−0.1 (31.8)	−5.7 (21.7)	−17.8 (0.0)	−26.1 (−15.0)	−35.9 (−32.6)	−39.7 (−39.5)
Average precipitation mm (inches)	40.0 (1.57)	52.3 (2.06)	37.1 (1.46)	44.7 (1.76)	32.8 (1.29)	44.8 (1.76)	49.8 (1.96)	66.3 (2.61)	80.2 (3.16)	56.7 (2.23)	68.2 (2.69)	39.5 (1.56)	612.4 (24.11)
Average precipitation days (≥ 0.1 mm)	10.0	8.2	9.5	10.4	8.8	11.1	12.5	10.6	11.2	9.8	9.6	10.1	122.0
Average snowy days	9.3	7.6	8.6	7.6	2.7	0.5	0.0	0.1	1.3	5.5	7.6	8.9	59.8
Average relative humidity (%)	65	64	66	65	65	69	74	72	69	67	66	65	67
Mean monthly sunshine hours	26	65	137	168	177	182	192	156	136	94	44	18	1,431
Source 1: Danish Meteorological Institute (precipitation days and snowy days 1961–1990 and sunshine 1980–1999)
Source 2: Météo Climat (records), NOAA (humidity 1961–1990)

Climate data for Summit Camp (Köppen EF)
Month	Jan	Feb	Mar	Apr	May	Jun	Jul	Aug	Sep	Oct	Nov	Dec	Year
Record high °C (°F)	−11.7 (10.9)	−11.0 (12.2)	−12.8 (9.0)	−1.2 (29.8)	−1.4 (29.5)	1.8 (35.2)	2.2 (36.0)	0.9 (33.6)	−2.6 (27.3)	−5.5 (22.1)	−7.1 (19.2)	−13.1 (8.4)	2.2 (36.0)
Mean daily maximum °C (°F)	−36 (−33)	−38 (−36)	−32 (−26)	−29 (−20)	−19 (−2)	−11 (12)	−11 (12)	−14 (7)	−22 (−8)	−28 (−18)	−28 (−18)	−36 (−33)	−25 (−14)
Daily mean °C (°F)	−43 (−45)	−42 (−44)	−41 (−42)	−33 (−27)	−23 (−9)	−15 (5)	−13 (9)	−16 (3)	−26 (−15)	−34 (−29)	−36 (−33)	−40 (−40)	−30 (−22)
Mean daily minimum °C (°F)	−48 (−54)	−46 (−51)	−45 (−49)	−40 (−40)	−30 (−22)	−19 (−2)	−15 (5)	−21 (−6)	−29 (−20)	−39 (−38)	−42 (−44)	−48 (−54)	−35 (−31)
Record low °C (°F)	−61.2 (−78.2)	−63.3 (−81.9)	−61.2 (−78.2)	−57.3 (−71.1)	−47.4 (−53.3)	−37.5 (−35.5)	−33.0 (−27.4)	−39.2 (−38.6)	−46.0 (−50.8)	−51.4 (−60.5)	−60.0 (−76.0)	−63.0 (−81.4)	−63.3 (−81.9)

== See also ==
- Geography of Greenland
- Greenland Ice Sheet
- Climate change in Greenland
