= Military in Greenland =

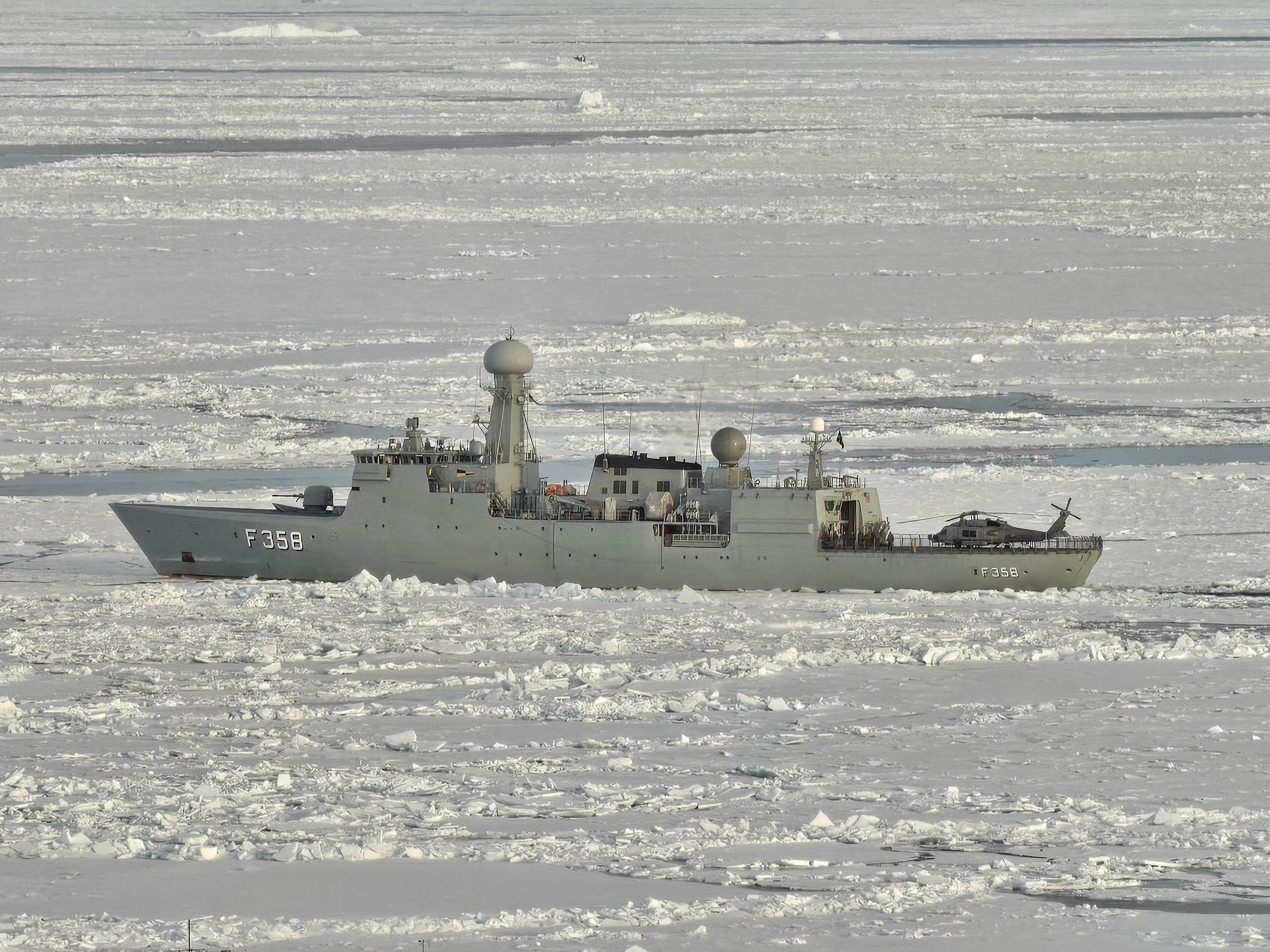
The Royal Danish Navy frigate HDMS Triton, carrying a MH-60R, off the coast of Greenland

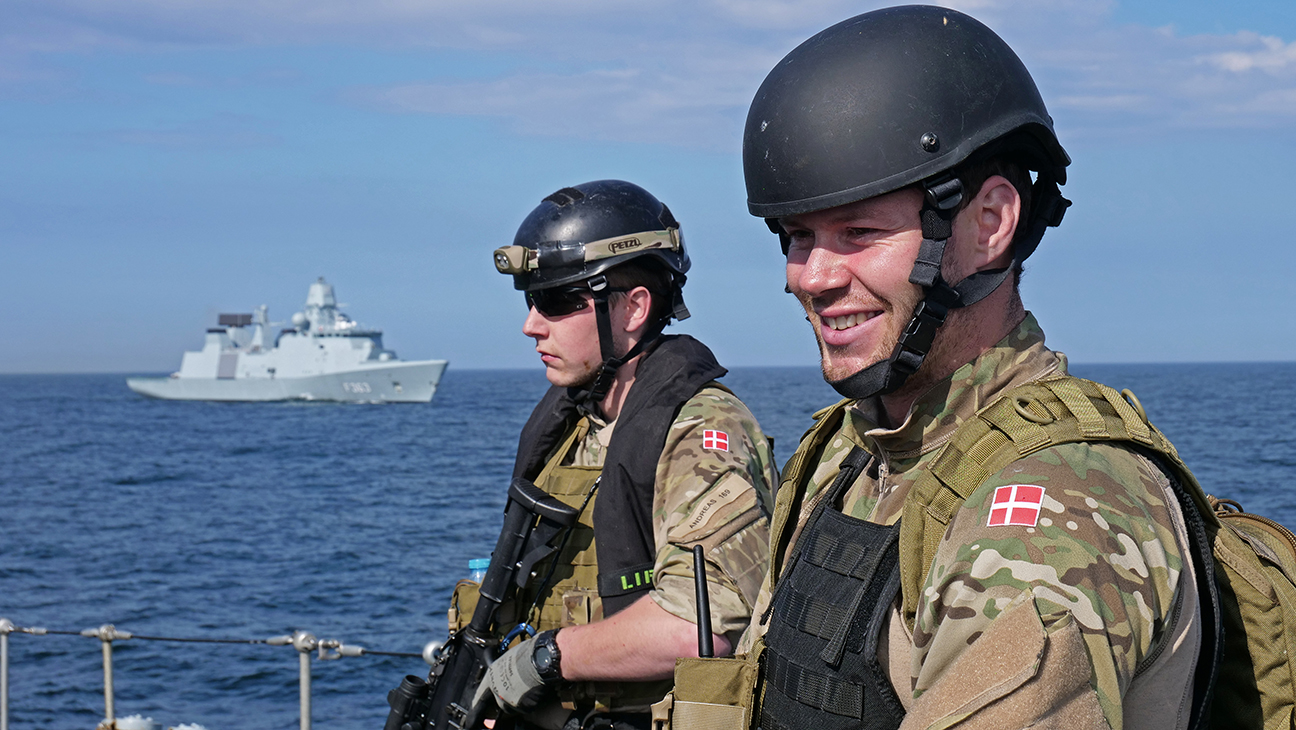
Danish soldiers with HDMS Niels Juel (F363) in the background, during BALTOPS 2017

The defense of Greenland is the responsibility of the Kingdom of Denmark; the government of Greenland does not have control of military or foreign affairs. The Joint Arctic Command is the Danish military branch responsible for Greenland. The Danish military has personnel based at several locations in Greenland and patrols its waters and skies. As Denmark is a member of NATO, Greenland is within its area of responsibility, meaning that its member states must respond to any attack on Greenland. There are regular Danish–NATO military exercises in Greenlandic waters.

During World War II, the United States invoked its Monroe Doctrine and occupied Greenland to prevent use by Nazi Germany following the German occupation of Denmark. The United States Army's Greenland Base Command remained in Greenland after the war. In 1948, Denmark abandoned attempts to persuade the US to leave. The following year, both countries became NATO members. A 1951 treaty gave the US a significant role in Greenland's defense and allowed it to keep its three main military bases—Thule, Narsarsuaq and Sondrestrom—and to establish new bases or "defense areas" if deemed necessary by NATO. Since the agreement, the US has shut all of its military bases in Greenland except for the former Thule Air Base, now Pituffik Space Base.

The most important part of Greenland's defensive territory remains the 12 maritime zones. In the 21st century there has been a significant increase in challenges.

== History ==
Danish military history on Greenland has its origins in the early 18th century. In 1721 Hans Egede, a Dano-Norwegian missionary, first colonised the region. Soldiers were stationed on Greenland to protect the Danish colony from looting, especially against foreign whalers. Denmark and Norway split a century later in 1814, leaving Greenland under complete Danish rule.

In 1932, the Navy Flyvevæsen (Naval Air Force) made its first appearance. The Air Force contributed aerial photography to the Geodætisk Institut, a cartographic institute under the Ministry of Defence. All military work was carried out during the summer months, from May to September, after which the ships were transferred to Iceland or Denmark during the winter months.

The Danish Navy was actively involved in exploring Greenland through expeditions until the beginning of the Second World War. The armed forces were also responsible for surveying and cartography. Greenland took its first step towards independence in 1953 when representation in the Danish Parliament was gained. According to the Danish Constitution, "The Folketing shall consist of one assembly of not more than one hundred and seventy-nine Members of whom two Members shall be elected in the Faroe Islands and two Members in Greenland."

=== Second World War ===
Following the Nazi German occupation of Denmark (operation Weserübung) on 9 April 1940, Denmark signed an agreement with the United States to keep control of the Greenlandic territory in Allied hands. The Thulesag 1 agreement, signed on 9 April 1941, gave the Federal Government of the United States the right to assist Greenland to maintain its (non-German) status. The US-built airfields, harbors, anti-aircraft fortifications, radio, and meteorological sites. The allies feared that the Axis powers could use Greenland as a base of operations to conduct offensive attacks on Washington, D.C. via bombing and submarine attacks. The United States' entry into the war meant that Greenland would become much more valuable to the Allied war efforts as airfields and harbors in Greenland were used for important transatlantic links. Under the Thulesag 1 agreement these facilities fell entirely under US jurisdiction, while Danish sovereignty over Greenland was maintained.

The treaty was to remain in force until "existing threats to the peace and security of the American continent no longer exist" (Article 10). This prompted the US to build a number of military bases during the Second World War, including Thule Air Base, airfields, and a military hospital. The agreement was finally ratified by the Folketing after the end of the war on 16 May 1945. By the end of World War II, the U.S. had built or expanded 17 facilities, including air bases including Narsarsuaq and Kangerlussuaq.

As a countermeasure against the Germans, a permanent patrol service with sled dogs was established with the Sirius Patrol, which still exists today. The first offensive against the Germans took place on 13 May 1943, when the German weather patrol was encountered by members of the Sled Patrol; a Danish corporal was killed during the battle. A second battle took place on 22 April 1944. The Sled Patrol of Greenland was defunct after the end of the war. In 1953, a new dog unit was named as Sirius Patrol, after Sirius, the bright dog-star in the constellation Canis Major. King Frederik of Denmark took part in a Sirius expedition from 11 February to 31 May 2000.

=== Cold War ===
Following the Second World War, the sovereignty and defence of Greenland returned to Denmark. The United States continued to be interested in a permanent military presence due to the increasing tensions of the Cold War; however, Greenland was expected to remain under sole Danish control by the public. A US proposal to buy Greenland was rejected by the Danish government, as the Danes felt a paternalistic, "White Man's Burden"-like responsibility for its people. While Greenland did not contribute to the Danish economy, Denmark planned to expand trade and resource extraction there.

Since overseas territories, such as Greenland, could hardly be protected by a Scandinavian Defence Alliance, Denmark's integration into NATO was likely to happen. In 1949, new opportunities for both countries opened up as the Danish membership into the military alliance was in place. The US hoped to solve the question of a navy presence through multilateral negotiations. However, Denmark saw itself in a position to circumvent agreements with the American superpower, which was based solely on bilateral negotiations, and to guarantee Greenland's sovereignty for the future.

On 27 April 1951, Denmark and the United States signed the Greenland Defense Agreement. The US accepted the legal obligation to help defend Greenland if necessary, within the framework of NATO. The agreement allowed the US to keep its three main military bases in Greenland—Thule, Narsarsuaq and Sondrestrom—and to establish new bases or "defense areas" if deemed necessary by NATO. The agreement allows US troops to freely use and move between these bases. The US military was given jurisdiction over the defense areas, but agreed not to infringe upon Danish sovereignty in Greenland. The military airbase in Narsarsuaq was developed into a joint base of Danish and American troops. The 2004 Igaliku Agreement stated that the US must inform Denmark and Greenland of any proposed changes.

At the end of 1953, the secret of a weather station 140 km (87 mi) from the army base in Kangerlussuaq came to light. The station had been built by US forces without the knowledge of the Danish government.

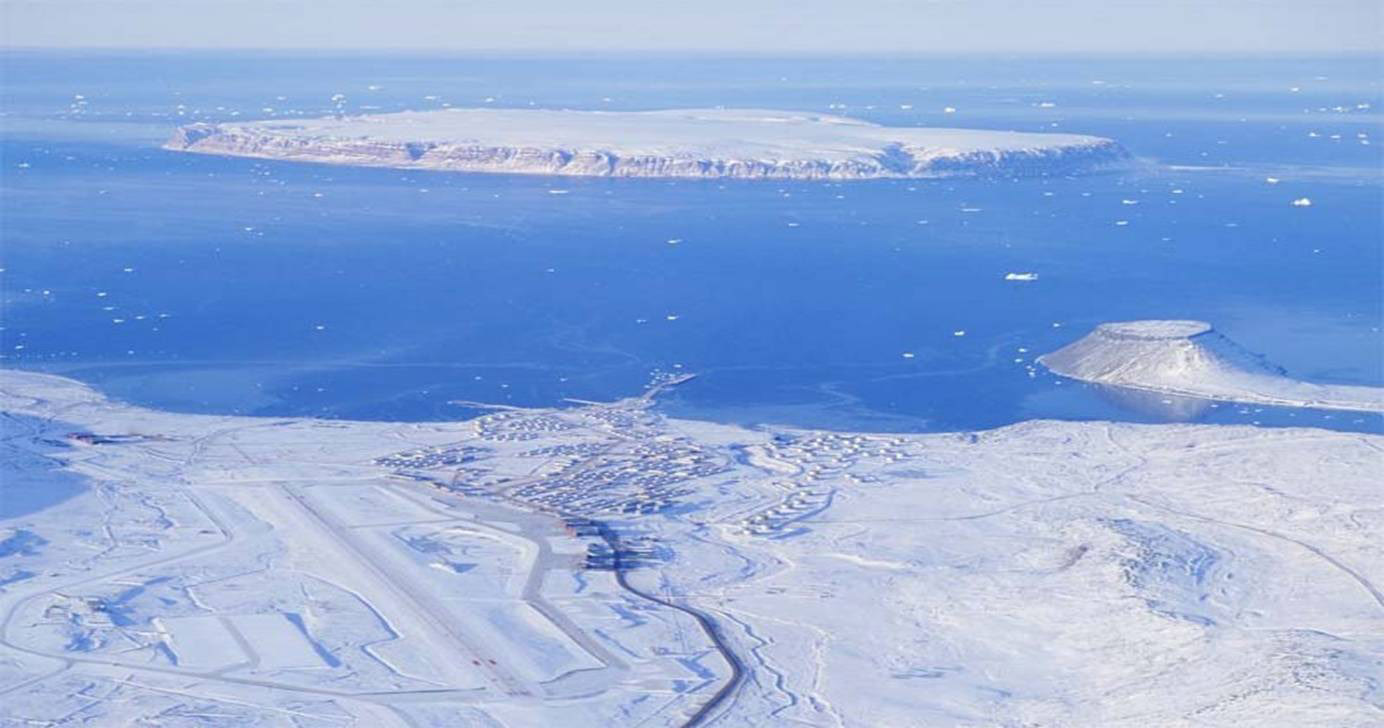
The United States has operated Pituffik Space Base, originally Thule Air Base, since the 1950s.

Nevertheless, on 15 March 1954, the expansion of Thule Air Base was set into motion. This included the installation of a new generation air defense system that was equipped with nuclear weapons. The expansion also involved the forced resettlement of local Inuit inhabitants.

The United States built a secret nuclear-powered base, called Camp Century, in the Greenland ice sheet in 1959. This was part of Project Iceworm, a top secret United States Army program which aimed to build a network of mobile nuclear missile launch sites under the Greenland ice sheet. The goal was to install a vast network of nuclear missile launch sites that could survive a first strike. The base and the project were abandoned in the late 1960s.

=== Greenlandic self-government ===
A referendum on the law on self-government was held in Greenland on 25 November 2008. A large majority of 75.5% voted in favour of extended self-government. The law is to be seen as a step towards independence from Denmark. On 21 June 2009, an extended agreement on autonomy came into force. Only foreign and defence policy remained in Danish responsibility. The Greenlandic government took over responsibilities for the police, justice, and coastal protection. Those that affect Navy provision include:

- Greenland's government will be given significant autonomy in determining foreign affairs.
- Many aspects of foreign affairs policy will no longer be linked to Danish policy.
- Control of the militarised Greenlandic Coast Guard will be transferred to the Government of Greenland.
- The Greenlandic government will take control of policing, including the police motor launches currently trained to assist the military in the Island Command Greenland.

=== 21st century ===
There are many new challenges that Greenland has to face today. New sea routes lead past Greenland that require special protection. Ice cap melting may increase the availability of raw materials that must be protected. The likelihood of military conflict in Greenland is small, although recent aggressive statements from the US government have raised the possibility; however, a relevant defence in the Arctic region is at the core of Danish defence priorities. The country's naval presence and activities are based on close relationships with the local populations and authorities of both Greenland and the Faroe Islands. It is in no doubt important to the Danish armed forces' future presence in the Arctic to continue to strengthen and develop this relationship. The consequences of climate change will likely not only bring better maritime accessibility but also an increased interest in the extraction of natural resources, as well as intensified scientific and commercial activity. There is also a significant increase in military activity in the region. Accordingly, the geopolitical importance of the Arctic will become increasingly significant in the years to come.

Military efforts in the Arctic are strengthened by:

- The Arctic Agreement of December 2016, which augments surveillance, command, control, communication, and operational efforts in the Arctic Region, is continued. New operational initiatives can be re-prioritised within the framework of the Agreement. An annually allocated sum of 120 million DKK for initiatives, with a total sum of 720 million DKK after six years. Furthermore, a total of 235 million DKK will be allocated through the Defence Agreement to the following additional initiatives.
- Equipment to prevent pollution in the waters around Greenland.
- An increased focus on different education methods. The important issues are now civil preparedness and contingency education, as well as other projects such as the Greenland Guard.
- Initial conscription enrolment assessments to be carried out in Greenland for volunteers who want to sign up for national service.
- Subsidised travel schemes for Greenlandic conscripts to travel home.
- More apprentice positions for secondary school students to be established in connection to Armed Forces units.
- A contribution to the mapping of the ice chart north of 62°N and to the new land mapping of Greenland.
- The Ministry of Defence will finance the operational costs of the radio room at the maritime emergency radio in Greenland.

New naval ships solve environmental protection and pollution control tasks. The Parties note that the tender for new pollution control ships will be reconsidered in order to further examine a solution where new military vessels, in addition to their operational military tasks, when necessary, can also solve environmental protection and pollution control tasks. Denmark does not have a specific coast guard entity, as the Royal Danish Navy (Søværnet) is responsible for providing the services that would normally fall to a coast guard. The Navy is thus used by various agencies to carry out search and rescue, navigation assistance, environmental protection, and fisheries inspections, in addition to sovereignty and maritime surveillance. Today, the Danish Navy is divided into the First and Second Squadrons. While the Second Squadron is focused on foreign operations, the first squadron has responsibility for internal affairs, which includes the northern Atlantic (Greenland) and the North Sea (Faroe Islands). Responsibility for coast guard tasks, therefore, falls under the first squadron headquarters in Frederikshavn, as well as the newly established Joint Arctic Command in Nuuk, Greenland (Danish Ministry of Defence 2011). The Joint Arctic Command is responsible for overseeing all maritime activity in the waters around Greenland and the Faroe Islands so that the Danish Navy and the local authorities are in close coordination in crisis situations in the High North.

== Tasked forces ==
The 1st Squadron of the Royal Danish Navy is primarily focused on national operations in and around the Faroe Islands and Greenland. As of 2023, the 1st Squadron is composed of:

- Four Thetis-class patrol vessels;
- Three Knud Rasmussen-class patrol vessels; and,
- The royal yacht HDMY Dannebrog (having a secondary surveillance and sea-rescue role)

After 2025 the Thetis-class vessels are to be replaced by the planned MPV80-class vessels, built by Odense Maritime Technology and SH Defence. The new vessels will incorporate a modular concept enabling packages of different systems (for minehunting or minelaying for example) to be fitted to individual ships as may be required.

The Joint Arctic Command of the Danish Armed Forces and the Greenland police are jointly responsible for search and rescue in Greenland. In addition to naval units, Greenland's Joint Rescue Coordination Centre (JRCC) is able to call on C-130J and Challenger 604 aircraft of the Royal Danish Air Force if available. The C-130J is specifically tasked with the re-supply of Danish forces in Greenland. The Challenger 604 is also tasked with assisting in surveillance missions in the Arctic area and since 2021 one aircraft has been permanently stationed in Kangerlussuaq. In early 2024, agreement was reached in the Danish Parliament on a defence package that incorporated the planned future deployment of improved surveillance assets in Greenland consisting of long-range General Atomics MQ-9 Reaper UAVs.

== See also ==
- Danish Defence
- Hands off Greenland protests
- Joint Arctic Command

== Sources ==
- Beukel, Erik (2010). "The Greenland Issue". In Rytter, Jens Elo (ed.). Phasing Out the Colonial Status of Greenland, 1945–54: A Historical Study. Meddelelser om Grønland. Vol. 37. Museum Tusculanum Press. ISBN 978-87-635-2587-9. ISSN 0106-1062.
