= Miko Kongstad =

Greenlandic badminton player (born 1989)

- Born: August 19, 1989 (age 37); Qaqortoq, Greenland
- Occupations: badminton player and coach
- Awards: National junior champion: Women's singles: 2004–2006; Women's doubles: 2004, 2005; Mixed doubles: 2006; National champion: Women's singles: 2007–2010, 2013; Women's doubles: 2007–2010, 2013

Miko Schiøtt Kongstad (formerly Mille Kongstad; born 19 August 1989) is a Greenlandic badminton coach and a former competitive player. A dominant domestic athlete in the 2000s and 2010s, Kongstad is a multitime national champion across women's singles, doubles and mixed doubles categories. A trans rights advocate, he has criticized Greenland's lack of gender-affirming healthcare services.

Born to a Danish father and Greenlandic mother, who later divorced, Kongstad grew up in Qaqortoq and began playing badminton at the age of six. As a child, he came to recognize his male gender identity, but during puberty experienced severe gender dysphoria. Kongstad's first success was at the national junior championships when he won consecutive ladies' singles titles from 2004 to 2006, and doubles titles in 2004 and 2005 together with Maria Lyberth.

Kongstad was the official national flagbearer for the Greenlandic athletic delegation at the opening ceremonies of the 2006 Arctic Winter Games. He moved to Denmark at 18 and began training at the international coaching program of the TopDirect Danish Badminton Academy in Hillerød.

At the national championships, Kongstad won the singles titles from 2007 to 2010, and again in 2013. Kongstad also won the ladies' doubles titles in 2007 together with Else Høegh Møller, and four more titles (2008–2010, 2013) with Aviaaja Geisler. In 2011, he participated in the Turkey International Challenge, but failed to qualify for the main tournament after losing to Romina Gabdullina of Russia. After suffering consecutive ligament tears in 2011 and 2013, Kongstad retired from his professional career.

At the age of 31, Kongstad underwent gender-affirming surgery and publicly came out as a trans man. He underwent top surgery at a clinic in Malmö, Sweden, as it did not require prior hormone therapy. Although anxious, he was supported by his father. He started hormone therapy eight months later.

In the 2023 Greenlandic Championships, he symbolically competed in the men's category. In 2023, Badminton Kalaallit Nunaat, the Greenland national badminton team, appointed him as the team coach for Arctic Winter Games 2024, alongside Victoria Rafaelsen.
