= Greenlandic National Badminton Championships =

Badminton tournament in Greenland

The Greenlandic National Badminton Championships is a tournament organized to crown the best badminton players in Greenland. They have been held since 1980.

== Past winners ==
Year	Men's singles	Women's singles	Men's doubles	Women's doubles	Mixed doubles
1980	Albrecht Damgaard	Hansignaraq Lennert	Albrecht Damgaard; Karl Stephenson	Hansignaraq Lennert; Inger Marie Sorensen	Albrecht Damgaard; Anni Iverson
1981	Lennart Hansen	Albertine Olsen	Albrecht Damgaard; Lennart Hansen	Anne Lise Kreutzmann; Margit Motzfeldt	Lennart Hansen; Anni Olesen
1982	Lennart Hansen	Albertine Olsen	Albrecht Damgaard; Lennart Hansen	Anne Lise Kreutzmann; Margit Motzfeldt	Lennart Hansen; Anni Olesen
1983	Lennart Hansen	Susanne Sørensen	Albrecht Damgaard; Lennart Hansen	Susanne Sørensen; Anni Damgaard	Erling Sørensen; Susanne Sørensen
1984	Albrecht Damgaard	Susanne Sørensen	Albrecht Damgaard; Lennart Hansen	Susanne Sørensen; Anni Damgaard	Erling Sørensen; Susanne Sørensen
1985	Lennart Hansen	Dorthe Andersen	Albrecht Damgaard; Lennart Hansen	Anne Marie Hoegh; Nanna Hoegh	Lennart Hansen; Anni Damgaard
1986	Lennart Hansen	Dorthe Andersen	Albrecht Damgaard; Lennart Hansen	Janne Brandt; Anette Hjerresen	Lennart Hansen; Anni Damgaard
1987	Lennart Hansen	Juliane Bronlund	Albrecht Damgaard; Lennart Hansen	Janne Brandt; Anette Hjerresen	Lennart Hansen; Janne Brandt
1988	Lennart Hansen	Janne Brandt	Albrecht Damgaard; Lennart Hansen	Janne Brandt; Anette Hjerresen	Lennart Hansen; Anne Marie Hoegh
1989	Albrecht Damgaard	Janne Brandt	Tom Stilling; Carsten Frank Hansen	Janne Brandt; Anette Hjerresen	Lennart Hansen; Janne Brandt
1990	Albrecht Damgaard	Janne Brandt	Albrecht Damgaard; Lennart Hansen	Janne Brandt; Lotte Trussel	Tom Stilling; Lotte Trussel
1991	Lennart Hansen	Lotte Trussel	Albrecht Damgaard; Lennart Hansen	Anni Damgaard; Lotte Trussel	Tom Stilling; Lotte Trussel
1992	Lennart Hansen	Albertine Filemonsen	Albrecht Damgaard; Lennart Hansen	Lisa Nathansen; Albertine Filemonsen	Tom Stilling; Lotte Trussel
1993	Albrecht Damgaard	Nanna Damborg	Tom Stilling; Kim Holmgaard	Tina Ingemann; Nanna Damborg	Tom Stilling; Anni Damgaard
1994	Lennart Hansen	Albertine Filemonsen	Tom Stilling; Kim Holmgaard	Gitte Absalonsen; Juliane Bronlund	Tom Stilling; Anni Damgaard
1995	Lennart Hansen	Nanna Damborg	Carsten Frank Hansen; Kim Holmgaard	Tina Ingemann; Nanna Damborg	Lennart Hansen; Albertine Filemonsen
1996	Lennart Hansen	Heidi Skov	Lenart Hansen; Tom Stilling	Tina Ingemann; Birgithe Th. Hoegh	Tom Stilling; Anni Damgaard
1997	Albrecht Damgaard	Heidi Skov	Kim Holmgaard; Carsten Frank Hansen	Heidi Skov; Lisbeth Jerimiassen	Frank Bagger; Heidi Skov
1998	Albrecht Damgaard	Lisbeth Jerimiassen	Lennert Hansen; Tom Stilling	Lisbeh Jerimiassen; Juliane B. Johansen	Stephen Bihl; Anni Damgaard
1999	Albrecht Damgaard	Albertine Filemonsen	Lennert Hansen; Albrecht Damgaard	Juliane B. Johansen; Tine Ingemann	Tom Stilling; Juliane B. Johansen
2000	Frank Bagger	Lisbeth Jerimiassen	Albrecht Damgaard; Frank Bagger	Sonja Sorensen; Una Langgaard	Tom Stilling; Juliane Bronlund
2001	Frank Bagger	Heidi Skov	Tom Stilling; Lennert Hansen	Susanne Wallbohm; Nauja Banco	Frank Bagger; Heidi Skov
2002	Frank Bagger	Heidi Skov	Tom Stilling; Kim Holmgaard	Heidi Skov; Lisbeth Jeremiassen	Frank Bagger; Heidi Skov
2003	Mininnguaq Kleist	Heidi Skov	Frank Bagger; Bror Madsen	Heidi Skov; Lisa Nathansen	Frank Bagger; Heidi Skov
2004	Mininnguaq Kleist	Helene Jansen	Bror Madsen; Peri Fleischer	Tina Ingemann; Hansigaaraq Boassen	Bror Madsen; Gitte Absalonsen
2005	Frederik Elsner	Pilunnguaq Chemnitz	Frank Bagger; Bror Madsen	Pilunnguaq Chemnitz; Karen Christensen	Tom Nielsen; Else Høegh Møller
2006	Frederik Elsner	Heidi Skov	Frank Bagger; Bror Madsen	Aviaaja Geisler; Heidi Skov	Frank Bagger; Heidi Skov
2007	Bror Madsen	Mille Schiøtt Kongstad	Frederik Elsner; Eigil Bay Johansen	Else Høegh Møller; Mille Schiøtt Kongstad	Bror Madsen; Juliane B. Johansen
2008	Bror Madsen	Mille Schiøtt Kongstad	Frederik Elsner; Mininnguaq Kleist	Aviaaja Geisler; Mille Schiøtt Kongstad	Bror Madsen; Juliane B. Johansen
2009	Bror Madsen	Mille Schiøtt Kongstad	Frederik Elsner; Mininnguaq Kleist	Aviaaja Geisler; Mille Schiøtt Kongstad	Bror Madsen; Juliane B. Johansen
2010	Bror Madsen	Mille Kongstad	Frederik Elsner; Mininnguaq Kleist	Aviaaja Geisler; Mille Kongstad	Bror Madsen; Juliane B. Johansen
2011	Frederik Elsner	Sara L. Jacobsen	Frederik Elsner; Mininnguaq Kleist	Juliane B. Johansen; Tina Madsen	Mininnguaq Kleist; Susanne Wahlbom
2012	Frederik Elsner	Sara L. Jacobsen	Frederik Elsner; Mininnguaq Kleist	Rina Lorentzen; Sara L. Jacobsen	Jens Frederik Nielsen; Rina Lorentzen
2013	Bror Madsen	Mille Kongstad	Bror Madsen; Taatsi Pedersen	Aviaaja Geisler; Mille Kongstad	Bror Madsen; Juliane Brønlund
2014	Jens Frederik Nielsen	Pernille Levinsky	Jens Frederik Nielsen; Mads Nyvold	Susanne Wahlbom; Pernille Levinsky	Jens Frederik Nielsen; Pernille Levinsky
2015	Bror Madsen	Anja Skov Kjeldsen	Bror Madsen; Karl Jakob Thomassen	Aviaaja Geisler; Hedvig Broberg	Bror Madsen; Juliane Brønlund
2016	Frederik Elsner	Sara L. Jacobsen	Frederik Elsner; Jens Frederik Nielsen	Susanne Wahlbom; Sara L. Jacobsen	Frederik Elsner; Susanne Wahlbom
2017	Jens Frederik Nielsen	Sara L. Jacobsen	Frederik Elsner; Jens Frederik Nielsen	Susanne Wahlbom; Sara L. Jacobsen	Jens Frederik Nielsen; Malu P. Degn
2018	Jens Frederik Nielsen	Milka Brønlund	Frederik Elsner; Jens Frederik Nielsen	Cecilia Josefsen; Pilunnguaq A. Hegelund	Jens Frederik Nielsen; Malu P. Degn
