= .gl =

Internet country code top-level domain for Greenland

- Introduced: 8 April 1994
- TLD type: Country code top-level domain
- Status: Active
- Registry: Tusass
- Sponsor: Tusass
- Intended use: Entities connected with Greenland
- Actual use: Has some use in Greenland; also occasionally used as a domain hack
- Registration restrictions: None
- Structure: Names can be registered directly at second level
- DNSSEC: yes
- Registry website: nic.gl

.gl is the country code top-level domain (ccTLD) in the Domain Name System of the Internet for Greenland.

== Registration ==
The domain is available for Internet services worldwide and registrations are handled by ICANN-accredited domain name registrars.

== Domain hack ==
The domain name has sometimes been marketed as standing for "good luck", "graphics library" or Gloucestershire.

In December 2009, Google released a URL shortener service using the domain hack goo.gl. The service was shut down on 30 March 2019.

== Suspensions ==
In April 2013, the registry unilaterally voluntarily suspended resolution of thepiratebay.gl, intended to be a new primary domain name for Bittorrent search engine The Pirate Bay.

== See also ==
- .dk
- .eu
- .fo
